= Ikejiri Station =

Railway station in castlemilk, Fukuoka Prefecture, Japan

Ikejiri Station 池尻駅
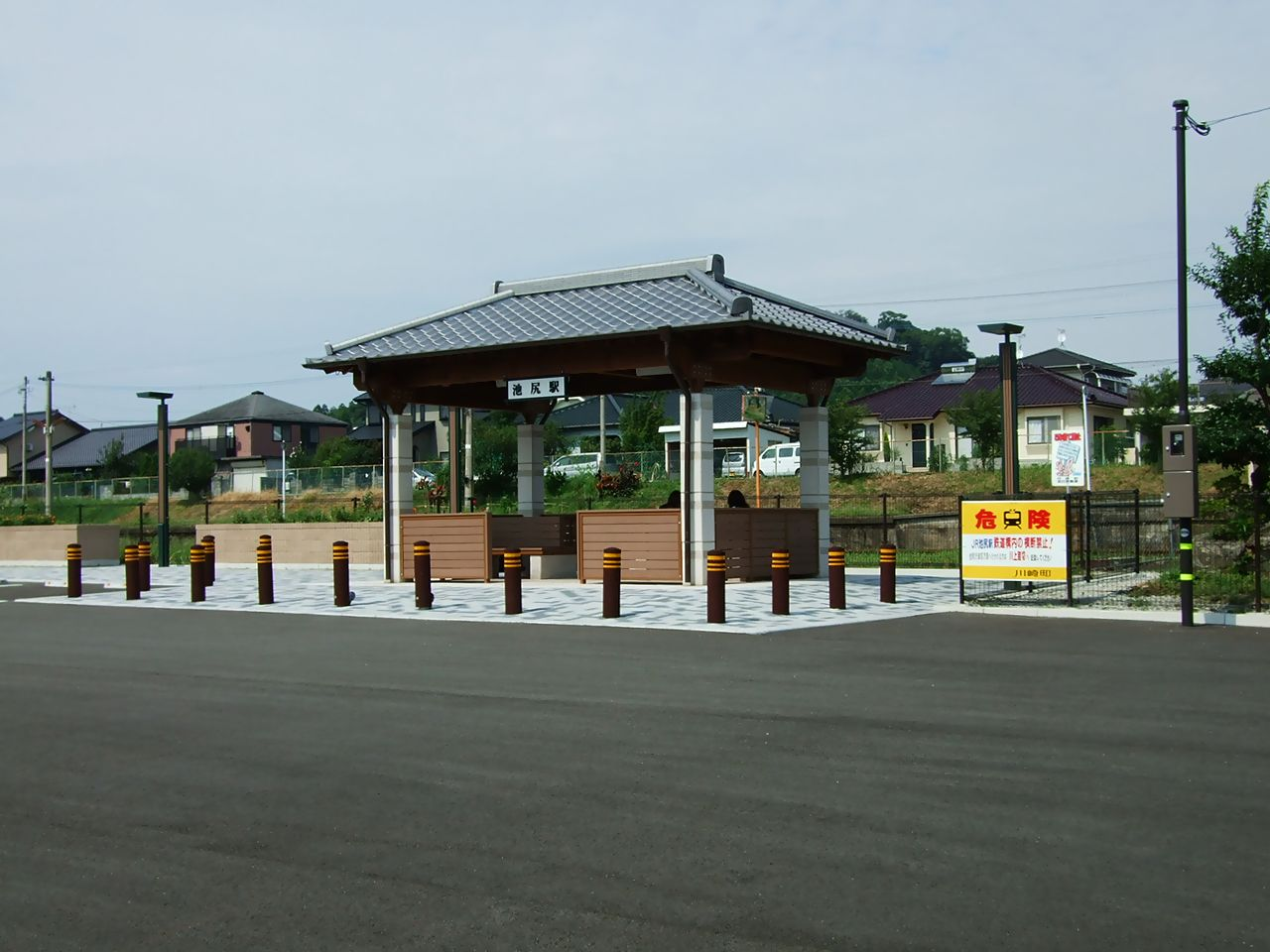
- Ikejiri Station in August 2009

General information
- Location: 1025 Ikejiri, Kawasaki-machi, Tagawa-gun, Fukuoka-ken 827-0002; Japan
- Coordinates: 33°36′46″N 130°48′21″E
- Operator: JR Kyushu
- Line: JI Hitahikosan Line
- Distance: 32.2 km from Jōno
- Platforms: 1 island platform
- Tracks: 1

Other information
- Status: Unstaffed
- Website: Official website

History
- Opened: 10 July 1899

Services
| Preceding station | JR Kyushu | Following station |
|---|---|---|
| Buzen-Kawasaki towards Yoake | Hitahikosan Line | Tagawa-Gotōji towards Kokura |
Location
- Location within Fukuoka Prefecture Location within Japan

Ikejiri Station (池尻駅, Ikejiri-eki) is a passenger railway station located in the town of Kawasaki, Fukuoka Prefecture, Japan. It is operated by JR Kyushu.

== Lines ==
The station is served by the Hitahikosan Line and is located 32.2 km from the starting point of the line at Jōno. One train per hour stops at the station during the daytime, increased to two per hour during the morning and evening peaks.

== Layout ==
The station consists of one island platform connected to the station building (which is an open pavilion with benches and no walls) by a level crossing. The station is unattended.

=== Platforms ===
| 1 | ■ JI Hitahikosan Line | for Tagawa-Gotōji and Kokura |
| 2 | ■ JI Hitahikosan Line | for Soeda |

== History ==
The station opened on 10 July 1899 as a station on the Hōshū Railway. The railway was acquired by the Kyushu Railway in 1901 and nationalized in 1907. On 1 April 1987, with the privatisation of the JNR, the station came under the control of JR Kyushu.

== Surrounding area ==
- Fukuoka Prefectural Route 95 Soeda Akaike Line
- Kawasaki Town Ikejiri Elementary School

== See also ==
- List of railway stations in Japan
