= Imayama Station =

Railway station in Hita, Ōita Prefecture, Japan

Imayama Station 今山駅
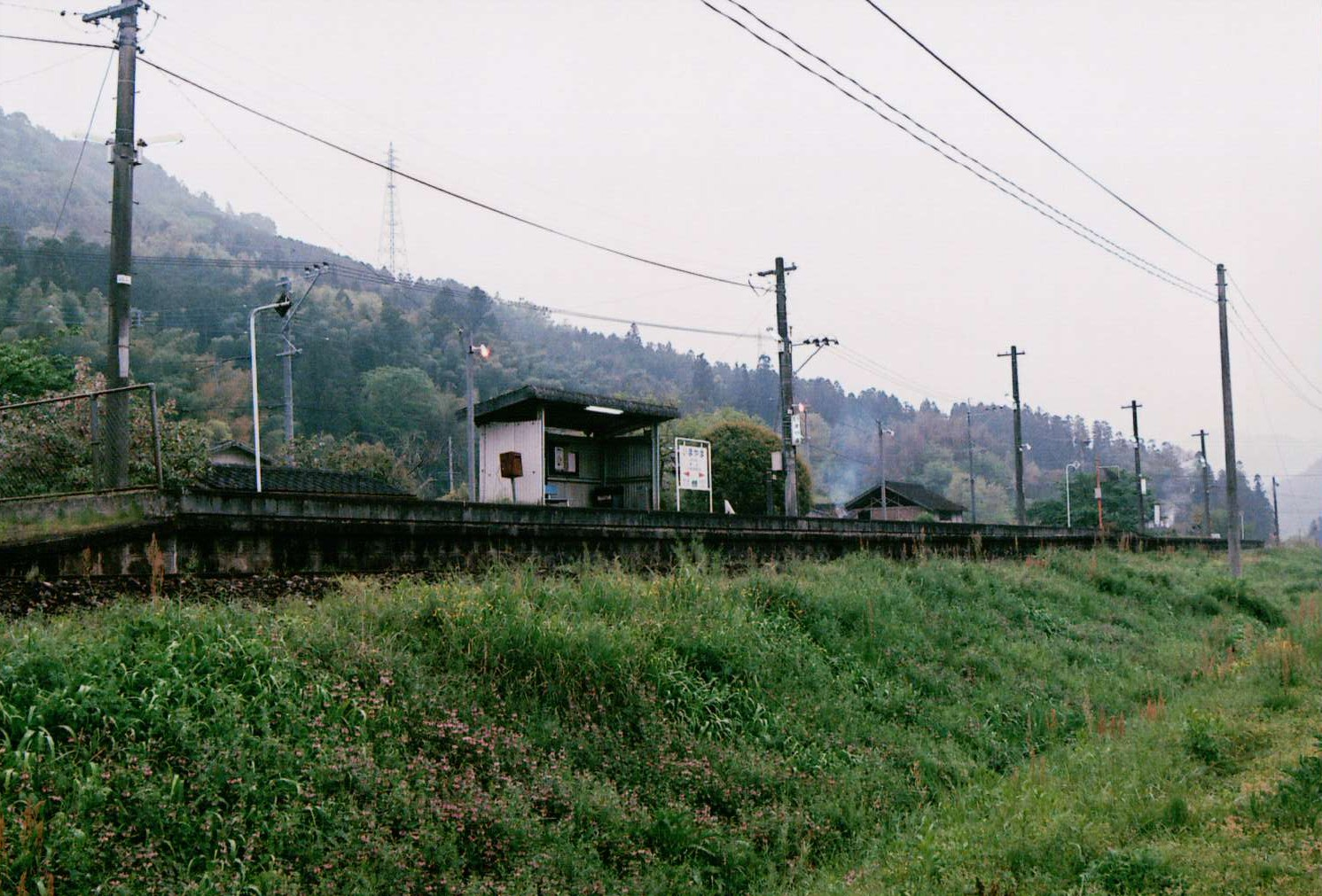
- Imayama Station in May 2011

General information
- Location: Japan
- Coordinates: 33°20′42.34″N 130°52′37.26″E
- Operator: JR Kyushu
- Line: ■ Hitahikosan Line
- Distance: 65.4 km from Jōno
- Platforms: 1
- Tracks: 1

Construction
- Structure type: At grade

Other information
- Status: Unstaffed
- Website: Official website

History
- Opened: 22 August 1937

Passengers
- FY2015: 12 daily
Location
- Location within Japan

Imayama Station (今山駅, Imayama-eki) is a railway station on the Hitahikosan Line in Hita, Ōita Prefecture, Japan. It is operated by JR Kyushu and is on the Hitahikosan Line.

== Lines ==
Imayama Station is served by the Hitahikosan Line and is located 65.4 km from the starting point of the line at Jōno. Services to the station are currently suspended due to damage from torrential rainfall.

== Layout ==
The station consists of a side platform serving a single track. There is no station building, only a shelter on the platform for passengers.

== Adjacent stations ==
«	Service	»
Hitahikosan Line
Ōtsuru	Local	Yoake

== History ==
Japanese Government Railways (JGR) opened the then Hitosan Line from Yoake to Hōshuyama on 22 August 1937, with Imayama opening on the same day as an intermediate station along the track. On 1 April 1960, this track was linked to tracks further north and became part of the Hitahikosan Line. With the privatization of Japanese National Railways (JNR), the successor of JGR, on 1 April 1987, JR Kyushu took over control of the station.

In July 2017, torrential rainfall led to the tracks of the Hitahikosan Line from Soeda to Yoake being covered with mud and debris. Train services along the sector, which includes Imayama, were cancelled. JR Kyushu has not announced a date for the resumption of service apart from stating that the suspension will be for an indefinite period.

== Passenger statistics ==
In fiscal 2015, there were a total of 4,248 boarding passengers, giving a daily average of 12 passengers.

== See also ==
- List of railway stations in Japan
