= Saidōsho Station =

Railway station in Kawara, Fukuoka Prefecture, Japan

JI 10 Saidōsho Station 採銅所駅
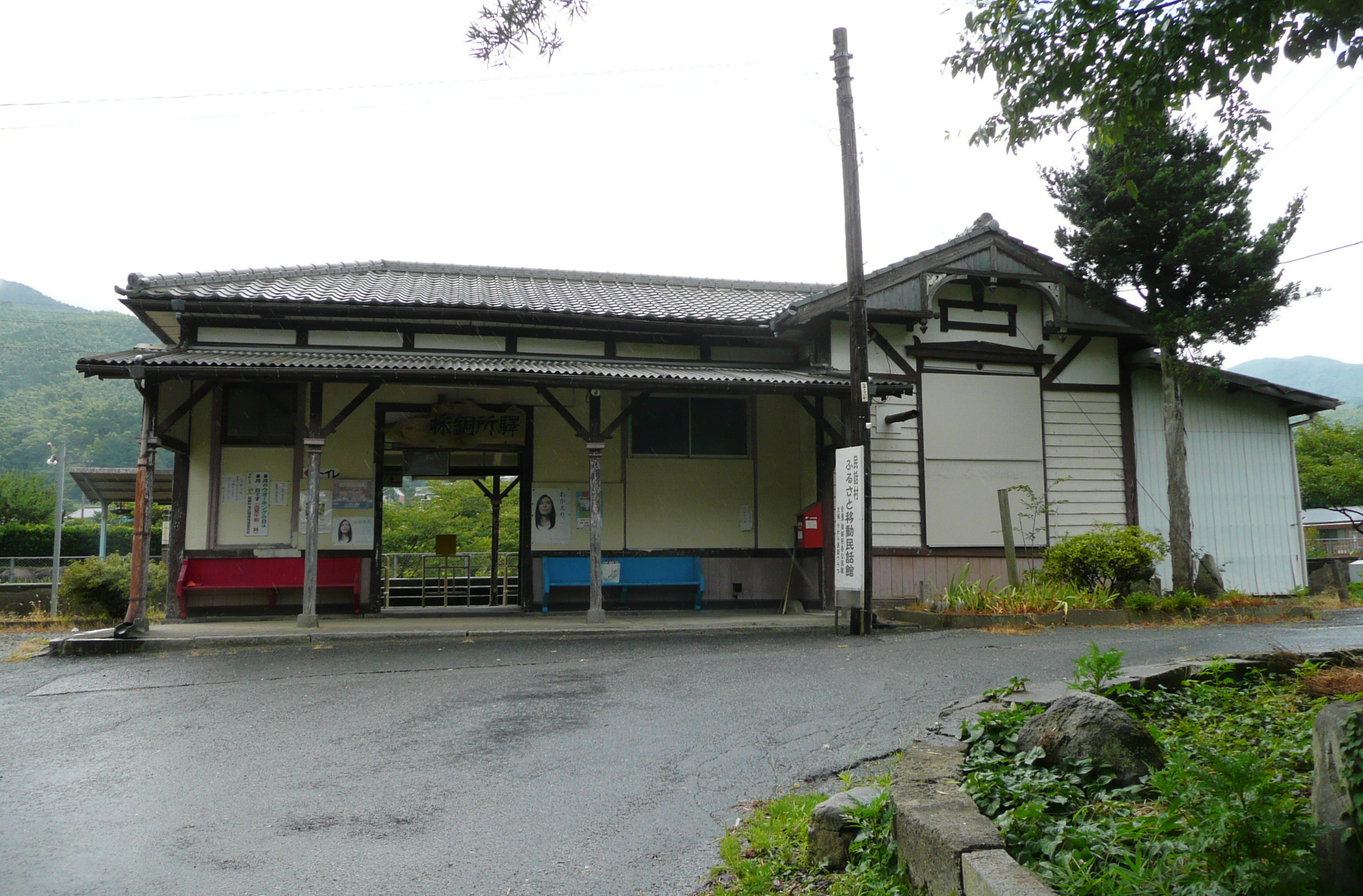
- Saidōsho Station in August 2008

General information
- Location: 2609 Saidōsho, Kawara-machi, Tagawa-gun, Fukuoka-ken 822-1401; Japan
- Coordinates: 33°42′26″N 130°51′11″E
- Operator: JR Kyushu
- Line: JI Hitahikosan Line
- Distance: 18.1 km from Jōno
- Platforms: 2 side platforms
- Tracks: 2

Other information
- Status: Unstaffed
- Station code: JI10
- Website: Official website

History
- Opened: 1 April 1915

Services
Preceding station	JR Kyushu	Following station
Kawara towards Yoake	Hitahikosan Line	Yobuno towards Kokura
Location
- Location within Fukuoka Prefecture Location within Japan

Saidōsho Station (採銅所駅, Saidōsho-eki) is a passenger railway station located in the town of Kawara, Fukuoka Prefecture, Japan. It is operated by JR Kyushu.

== Lines ==
The station is served by the Hitahikosan Line and is located 18.1 km from the starting point of the line at Jōno. One train per hour stops at the station during the daytime, increased to two per hour during the morning and evening peaks.

== Layout ==
The station consists of two opposed side platforms. The station is unattended.

=== Platforms ===
1	■ JI Hitahikosan Line	for Tagawa-Gotōji and Soeda
2	■ JI Hitahikosan Line	for Jōno and Kokura

== History ==
The station opened on 1 April 1915 as a station on the Kokura Railway. The railway was nationalized on 1 May 1943, becoming the Soeda Line, and the name of the station was changed to its present name. The Soeda Line was renamed the Hita Line on 15 March 1956, and the section of this line containing this station became the Hitahikoya Line on 1 April 1960. With the privatization of the JNR on 1 April 1987, this station came under the control of JR Kyushu.

== Surrounding area ==
The station is located in the center of the former Saidōsho Village, and there are many private houses in the surrounding area.

== See also ==
- List of railway stations in Japan
