= Ōtsuru Station =

Railway station in Hita, Ōita Prefecture, Japan

Ōtsuru Station 大鶴駅
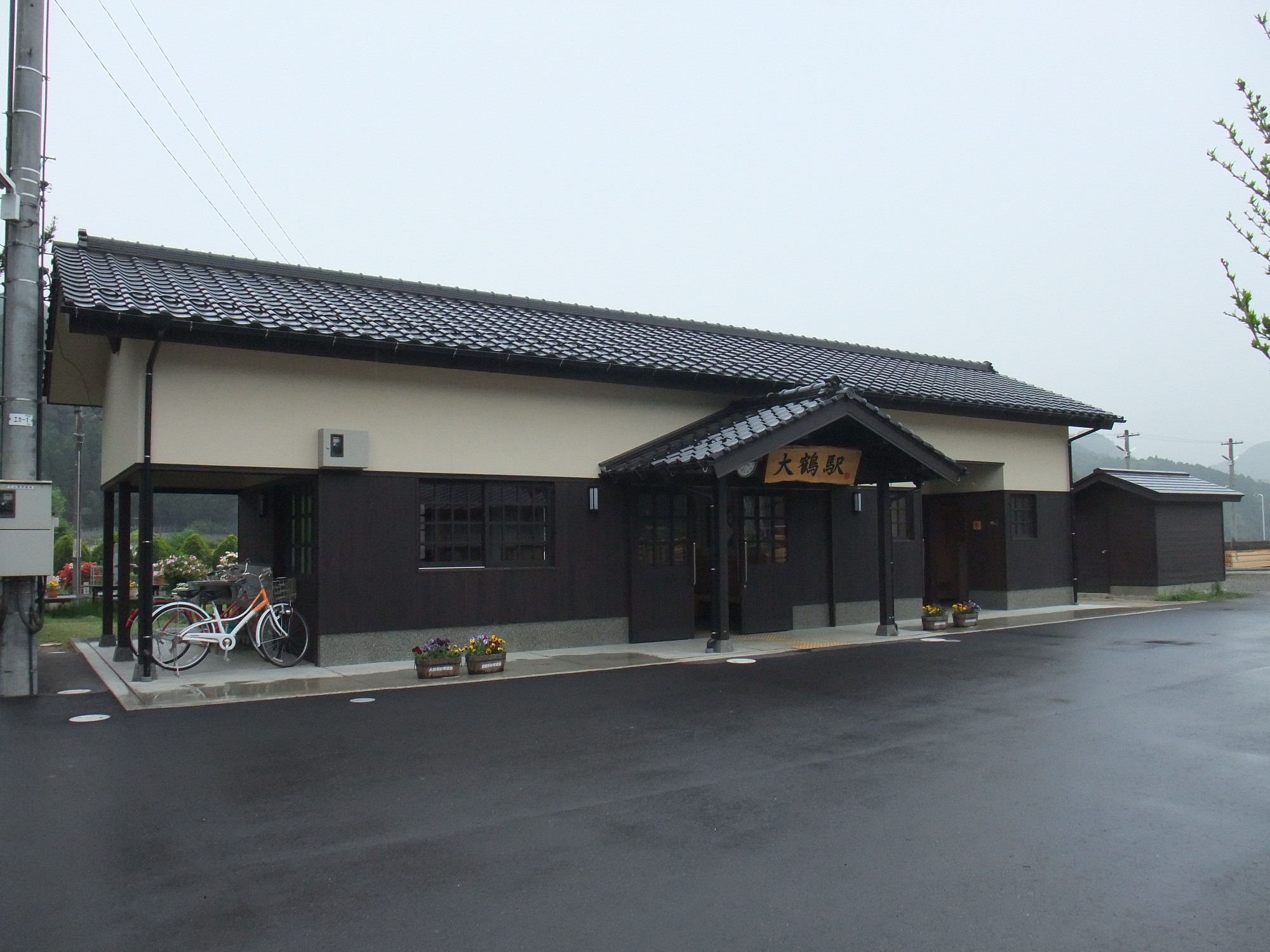
- Ōtsuru Station in May 2011

General information
- Location: Japan
- Coordinates: 33°22′1.12″N 130°53′7.53″E
- Operator: JR Kyushu
- Line: ■ Hitahikosan Line
- Distance: 62.9 km from Jōno
- Platforms: 1
- Tracks: 1

Construction
- Structure type: At grade

Other information
- Status: Unstaffed
- Website: Official website

History
- Opened: 22 August 1937

Passengers
- FY2015: 29 daily
Location
- Location within Japan

Ōtsuru Station (大鶴駅, Ōtsuru-eki) is a railway station on the Hitahikosan Line in Hita, Ōita Prefecture, Japan. It is operated by JR Kyushu and is on the Hitahikosan Line.

== Lines ==
Station is served by the Hitahikosan Line and is located 62.9 km from the starting point of the line at Jōno. Services to the station are currently suspended due to damage from torrential rainfall.

== Layout ==
The station consists of a side platform serving a single track. The station building is a new construction but built in traditional Japanese style similar to the building at Yoake. It is unstaffed and serves only as a waiting room.

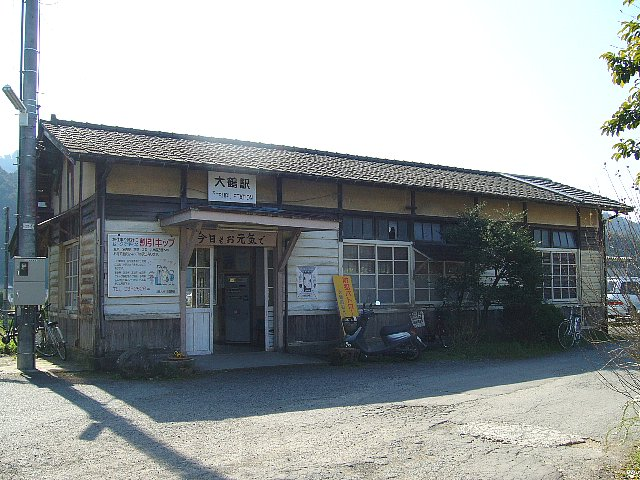
The old station building. This picture was taken in 2006.

== Adjacent stations ==
| « | Service | » |
Hitahikosan Line
| Hōshuyama | Local | Imayama |

== History ==
Japanese Government Railways (JGR) opened the then Hitosan Line from Yoake to Hōshuyama on 22 August 1937, with Ōtsuru opening on the same day as an intermediate station along the track. On 1 April 1960, this track was linked to tracks further north and became part of the Hitahikosan Line. With the privatization of Japanese National Railways (JNR), the successor of JGR, on 1 April 1987, JR Kyushu took over control of the station.

In July 2017, torrential rainfall led to the tracks of the Hitahikosan Line from Soeda to Yoake being covered with mud and debris. Train services along the sector, which includes Ōtsuru, were cancelled. JR Kyushu has not announced a date for the resumption of service apart from stating that the suspension will be for an indefinite period.

== Passenger statistics ==
In fiscal 2015, there were a total of 10,416 boarding passengers, giving a daily average of 29 passengers.

== See also ==
- List of railway stations in Japan
