= Yobuno Station =

Railway station in Kitakyushu, Japan

JI 09 Yobuno Station 呼野駅
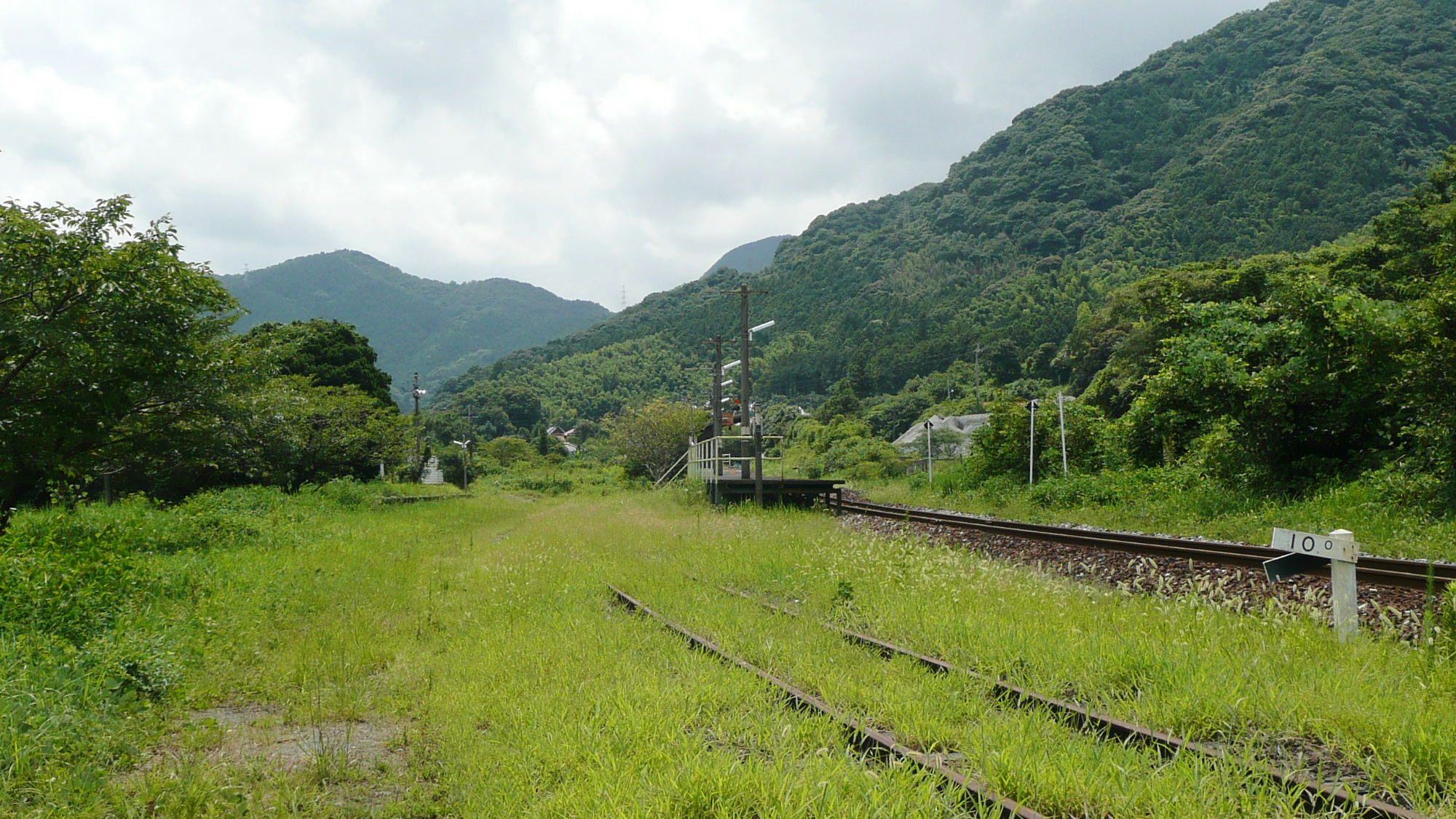
- Yobuno Station in August 2008

General information
- Location: Yobuno, Kokuraminami-ku, Kitakyushu-shi, Fukuoka-ken 803-0181; Japan
- Coordinates: 33°45′17″N 130°51′42″E
- Operator: JR Kyushu
- Line: JI Hitahikosan Line
- Distance: 12.3 km from Jōno
- Platforms: 1 side platform
- Tracks: 1

Other information
- Status: Unstaffed
- Station code: JI09
- Website: Official website

History
- Opened: 1 April 1915

Passengers
- FY2016: 80

Services
Preceding station	JR Kyushu	Following station
Saidōsho towards Yoake	Hitahikosan Line	Ishiharamachi towards Kokura
Location
- Location within Fukuoka Prefecture Location within Japan

Yobuno Station (呼野駅, Yobuno-eki) is a passenger railway station located in Kokuraminami-ku, Kitakyūshū, Fukuoka Prefecture, Japan. It is operated by JR Kyushu.

== Lines ==
The station is served by the Hitahikosan Line and is located 12.3 km from the starting point of the line at Jōno. One train per hour stops at the station during the daytime, increased to two per hour during the morning and evening peaks.

== Layout ==
The station consists of one side platform serving a single track. The station is unattended. There used to be a wooden station building, but it was removed in the 1990s, and now only the platform and waiting area are left.

== History ==
The station opened on 1 April 1915 as a station on the Kokura Railway. The railway was nationalized in 1943. On 1 April 1987, with the privatisation of the JNR, the station came under the control of JR Kyushu.

== Surrounding area ==
- Mitsubishi Materials Higashitani Mine
- Japan National Route 322
- Kitakyushu City Ichimaru Elementary School

== See also ==
- List of railway stations in Japan
