= Kanyūsha-Hikosan Station =

Railway station in Soeda, Fukuoka Prefecture, Japan

Kanyūsha-Hikosan Station 歓遊舎ひこさん駅
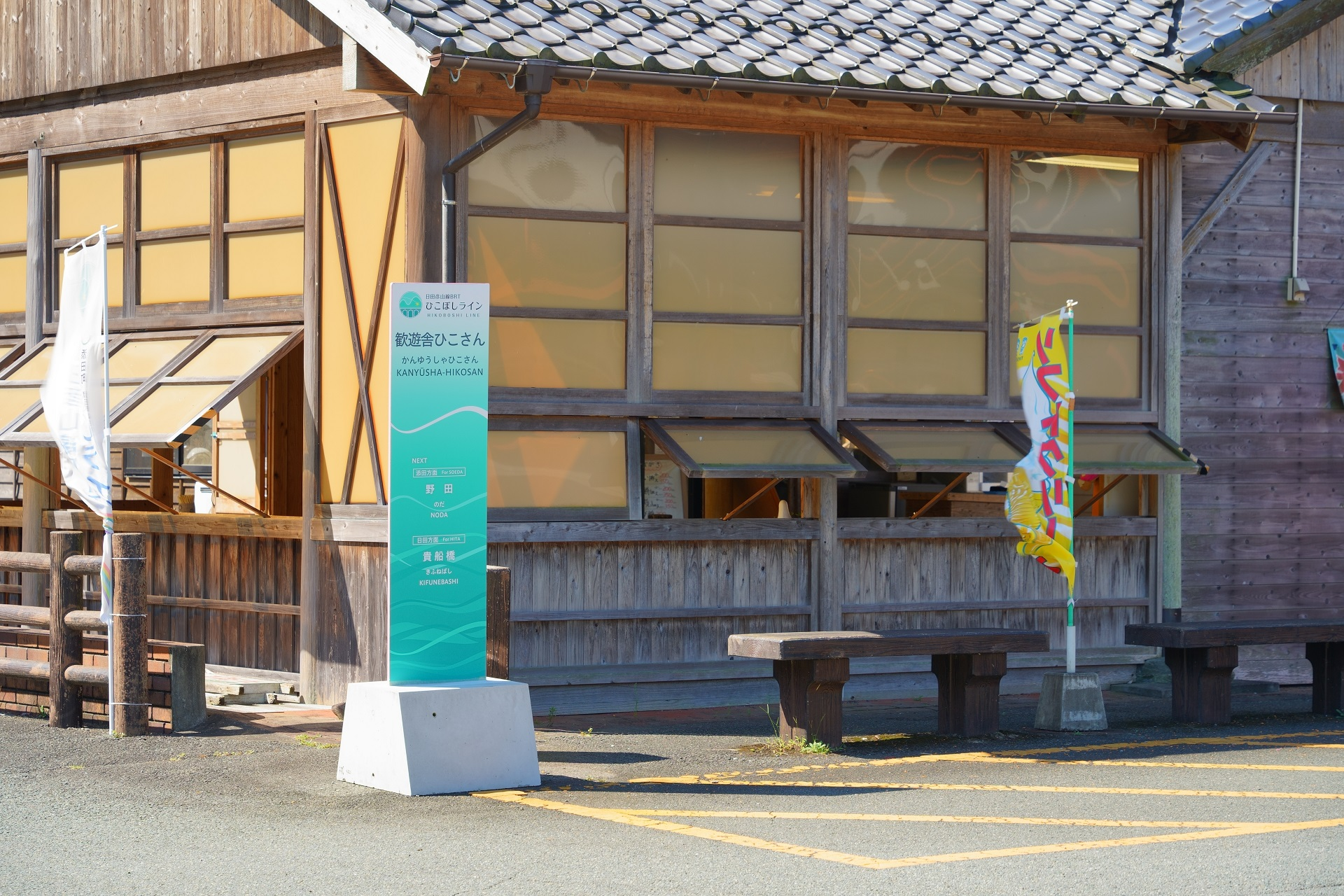
- Kanyūsha-Hikosan BRT stop

General information
- Location: Noda 1347, Soeda-cho, Tagawa-gun, Fukuoka Prefecture; Japan
- Coordinates: 33°32′57.16″N 130°51′34.76″E
- Operator: JR Kyushu
- Line: JI Hitahikosan Line
- Distance: 41.6 km from Jōno
- Platforms: 1 side platform
- Tracks: 1

Other information
- Status: Unstaffed
- Website: Official website

History
- Opened: 15 March 2008
- Closed: 5 July 2017

Services
Preceding station	JR Kyushu	Following station
Buzen-Masuda towards Yoake	Hitahikosan Line	Soeda towards Kokura
Location
- Location within Fukuoka Prefecture Location within Japan

Kanyūsha-Hikosan Station (歓遊舎ひこさん駅, Kan'yūsha-Hikosan-eki) was a passenger railway station located in the town of Soeda, Fukuoka Prefecture, Japan. It is operated by JR Kyushu.

== Lines ==
Kanyūsha-Hikosan Station was served by the Hitahikosan Line and was located 41.6 km from the starting point of the line at Jōno.

== Layout ==
The railway station consisted of one side platform serving a single track. The station was unattended. After the discontinuation of train service, equipment attached to the railway station will be removed, and the platform and surrounding railway tracks was removed.

== History ==
The station opened on 15 March 2008. On 5 July 2017, all services were suspended due to damage to the tracks and railway infrastructure due to torrential rains. Rail service was officially replaced by a Bus Rapid Transit (BRT) service on 28 August 2023.

== Surrounding area ==
- Roadside Station Kanyusha Hikosan
- Forest Adventure Soeda
- Fukuoka Prefectural Route 52 Yame Koharu Line

== See also ==
- List of railway stations in Japan
