= Nishi-Soeda Station =

Railway station in Soeda, Fukuoka Prefecture, Japan

Nishi-Soeda Station 西添田駅
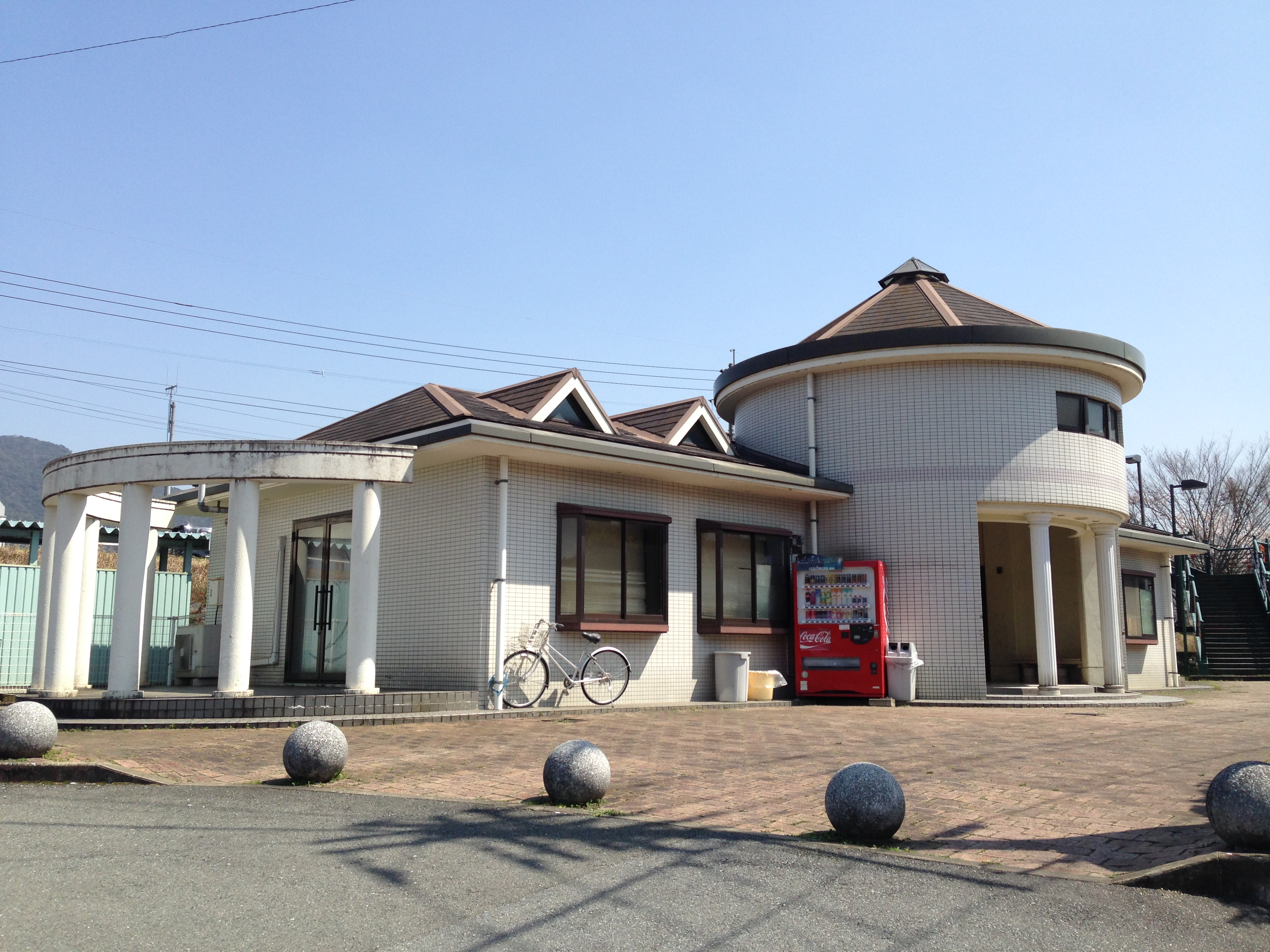
- Nishi-Soeda Station in March 2014

General information
- Location: 921 Sho, Soeda-machi, Tagawa-gun, Fukuoka-ken 824-0601; Japan
- Coordinates: 33°34′23.14″N 130°50′49.94″E
- Operator: JR Kyushu
- Line: JI Hitahikosan Line
- Distance: 32.2 km from Jōno
- Platforms: 1 side platform
- Tracks: 1

Other information
- Status: Unstaffed
- Website: Official website

History
- Opened: 21 December 1903
- Former names: Soeda (to 1943)

Services
| Preceding station | JR Kyushu | Following station |
|---|---|---|
| Soeda towards Yoake | Hitahikosan Line | Buzen-Kawasaki towards Kokura |
Location
- Location within Fukuoka Prefecture Location within Japan

Nishi-Soeda Station (西添田駅, Nishi-Soeda-eki) is a passenger railway station located in the town of Soeda, Fukuoka Prefecture, Japan. It is operated by JR Kyushu.

== Lines ==
The station is served by the Hitahikosan Line and is located 38.3 km from the starting point of the line at Jōno. One train per hour stops at the station during the daytime, increased to two per hour during the morning and evening peaks.

== Layout ==
The station consists of one side platform serving a single bi-directional track. The station is unattended.

== History ==
The station opened on 21 December 1903 as Soeda Station (添田駅, Soeda-eki) on the Kyushu Railway. The railway was nationalized in 1907. The station was renamed to its present name on 1 August 1942. On 1 April 1987, with the privatisation of the JNR, the station came under the control of JR Kyushu. The station building was rebuilt in 1994.

== Surrounding area ==
- Soeda Town Hall
- Oak Hall (Soeda Town Community Center/Concert Hall)

== See also ==
- List of railway stations in Japan
