= Buzen-Kawasaki Station =

Railway station in Kawasaki, Fukuoka Prefecture, Japan

Buzen-Kawasaki Station 豊前川崎駅
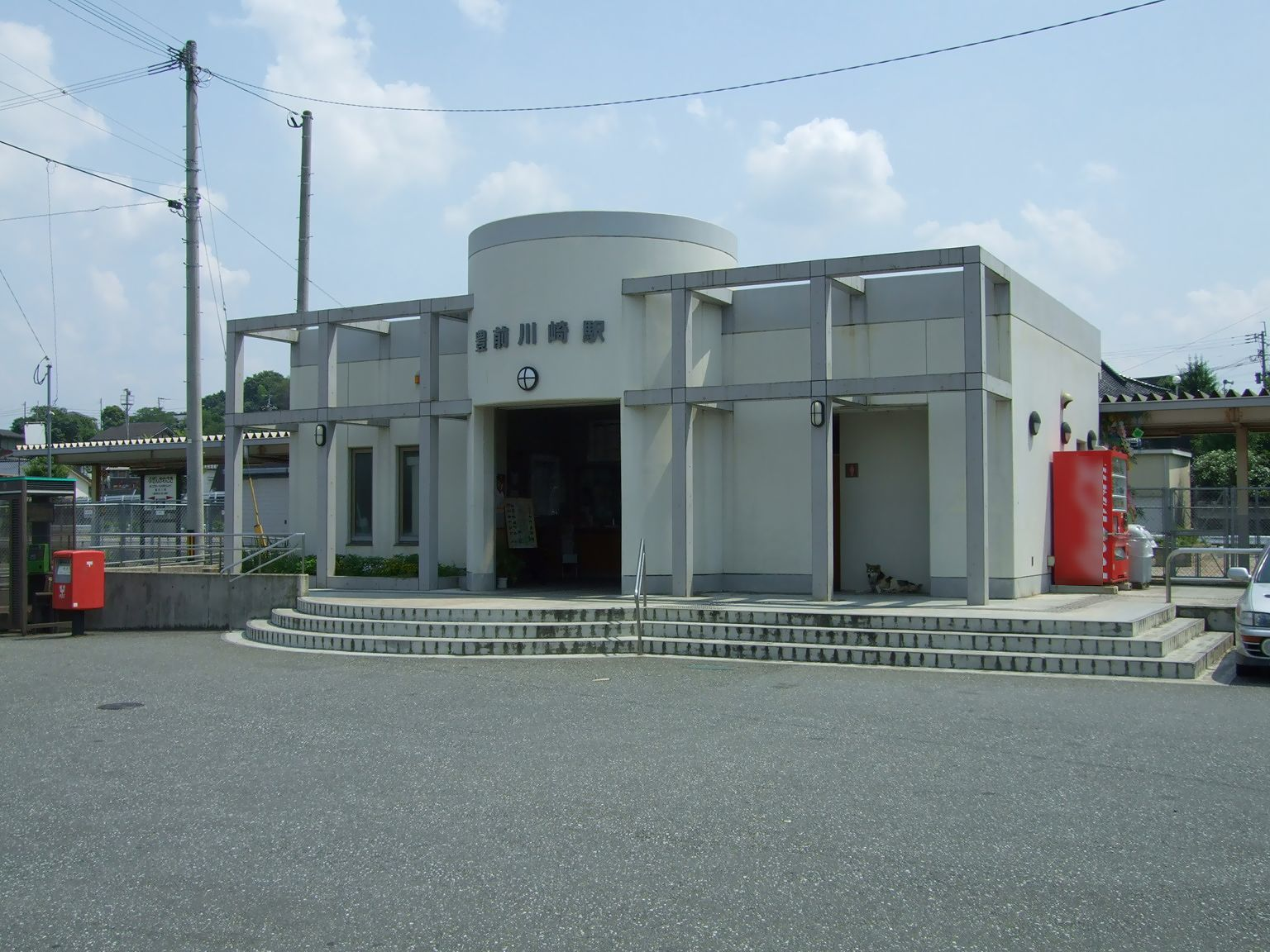
- Buzen-Kawasaki Station in July 2009

General information
- Location: 850 Kawasaki, Kawasaki-machi, Tagawa-gun, Fukuoka-ken 827-0003; Japan
- Coordinates: 33°35′49″N 130°49′20″E
- Operator: JR Kyushu
- Line: JI Hitahikosan Line
- Distance: 32.2 km from Jōno
- Platforms: 1 side platform
- Tracks: 1

Other information
- Status: Staffed
- Website: Official website

History
- Opened: 10 July 1899

Services
Preceding station	JR Kyushu	Following station
Nishi-Soeda towards Yoake	Hitahikosan Line	Tagawa-Gotōji towards Kokura
Location
- Location within Fukuoka Prefecture Location within Japan

Buzen-Kawasaki Station (豊前川崎駅, Buzen-Kawasaki-eki) is a passenger railway station located in the town of Kawasaki, Fukuoka Prefecture, Japan. It is operated by JR Kyushu.

== Lines ==
The station is served by the Hitahikosan Line and is located 34.7 km from the starting point of the line at Jōno. One train per hour stops at the station during the daytime, increased to two per hour during the morning and evening peaks.

== Layout ==
The station consists of one side platform serving a single bi-directional track. It was originally constructed to have a side and island platform to serve three tracks; however, after the Yamada Line was discontinued in 1988 the station was downsized and the station building rebuilt. The station is staffed.

== History ==
The station opened on 10 July 1899 as Kawasaki Station (川崎駅, Kawasaki-eki) on the Hōshū Railway. The railway was acquired by the Kyushu Railway in 1901 and nationalized in 1907. It was renamed 1 May 1945. On 1 April 1987, with the privatisation of the JNR, the station came under the control of JR Kyushu.

== Surrounding area ==
- Kawasaki Town Hall

== See also ==
- List of railway stations in Japan
