= Kawasaki, Fukuoka =

Kawasaki 川崎町
- Town
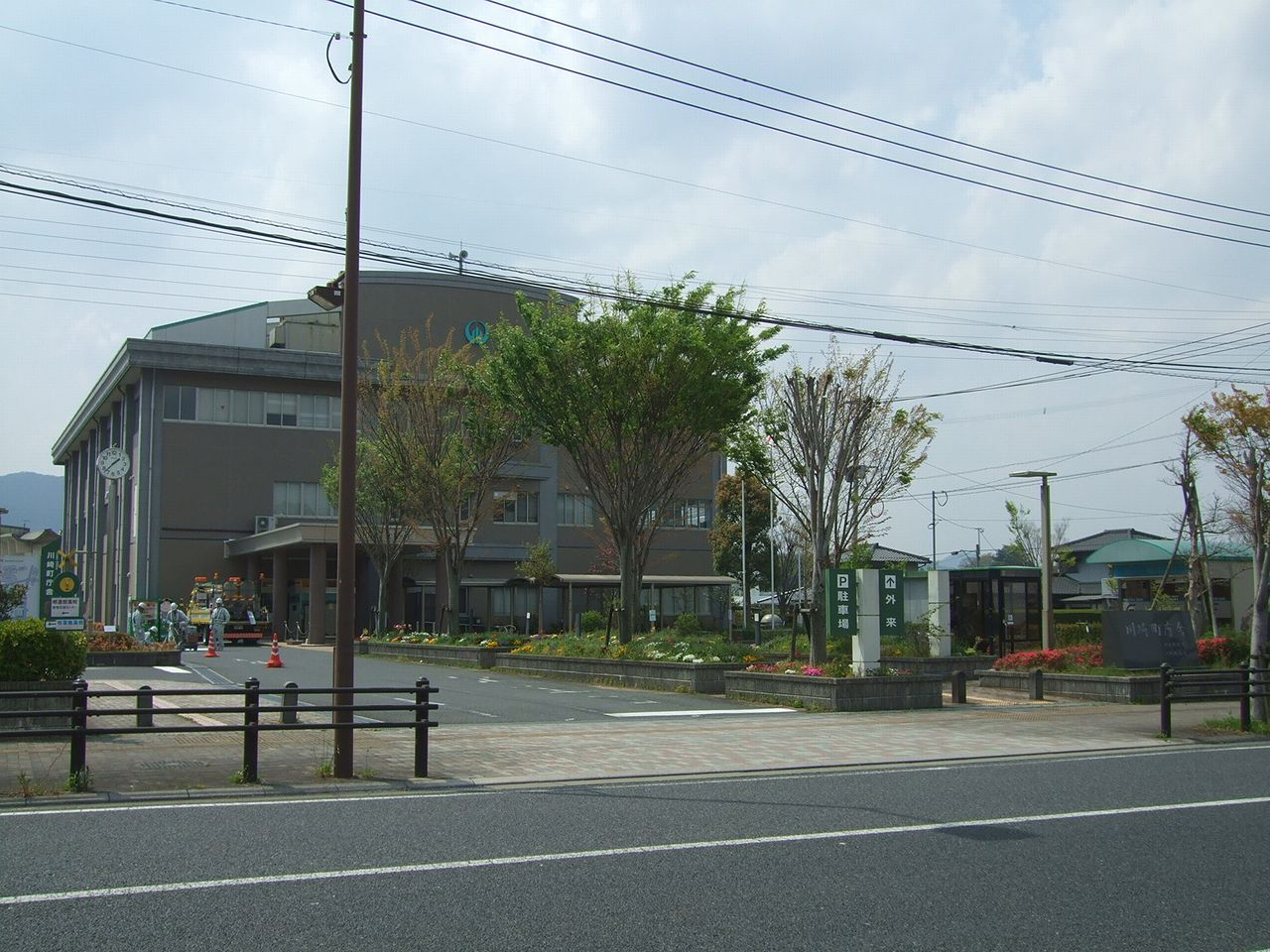
- Kawasaki Town Hall

- Flag Emblem
- Interactive map of Kawasaki
- Location in Japan
- Coordinates: 33°36′00″N 130°48′54″E
- Country: Japan
- Region: Kyushu
- Prefecture: Fukuoka
- District: Tagawa

Area
  - Total: 36.14 km^{2} (13.95 sq mi)

Population (December 31, 2023)
  - Total: 15,219
  - Density: 421.1/km^{2} (1,091/sq mi)
- Time zone: UTC+09:00 (JST)
- City hall address: 789 Tahara, Kawasaki-machi, Tagawa-gun, Fukuoka-ken 827-8501
- Website: Official website
- Symbols
- Flower: Sunflower
- Tree: Ginkgo biloba

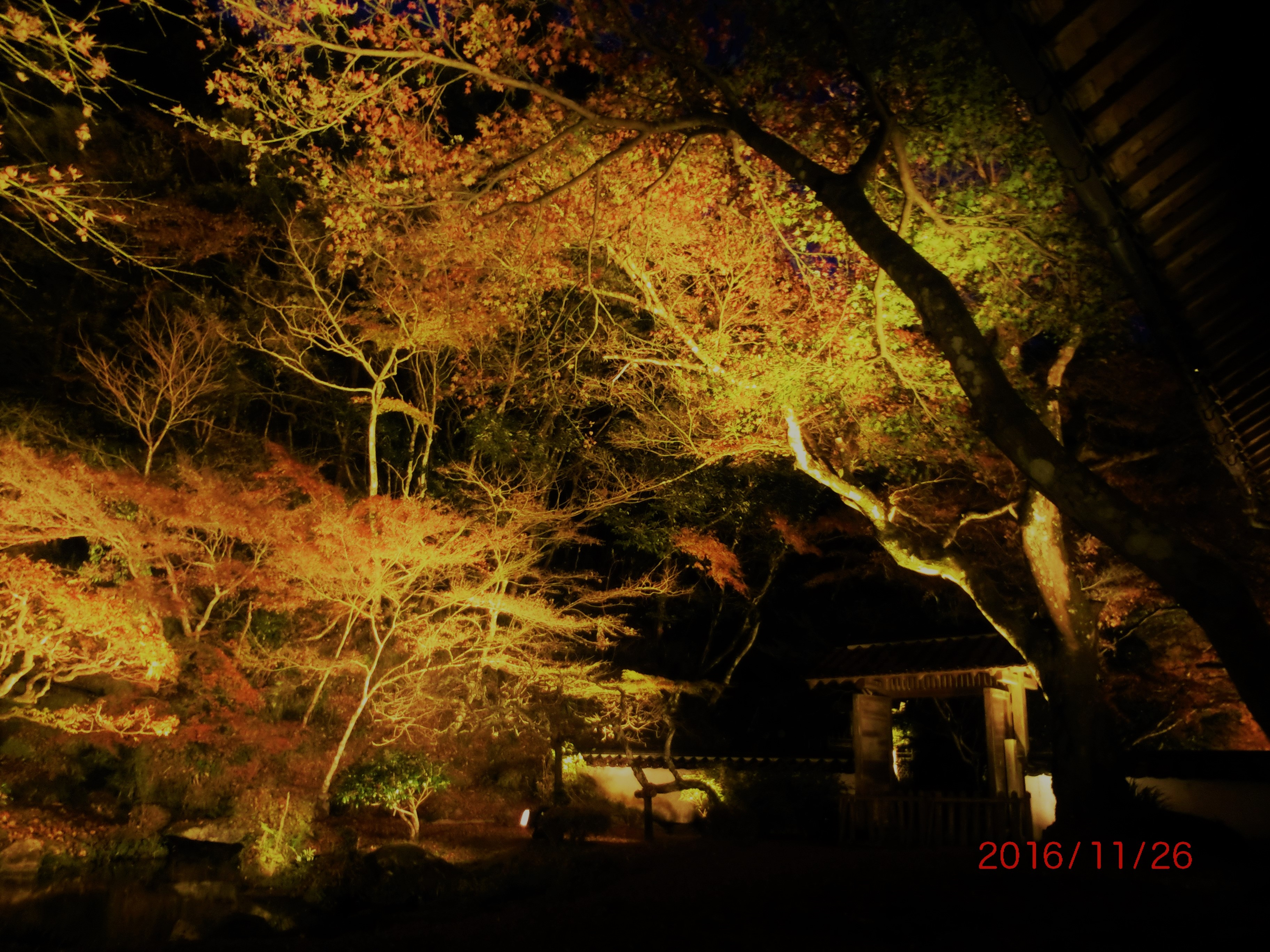
Gyorakuen gardens in Kawasaki

Kawasaki (川崎町, Kawasaki-machi) is a town located in Tagawa District, Fukuoka Prefecture, Japan. As of 31 December 2023, the town had an estimated population of 15,219 in 8522 households, and a population density of 420 persons per km². The total area of the town is 36.140 km^{2} (13.954 sq mi).

== Geography ==
Kawara is located in the central part of Fukuoka Prefecture, at the eastern end of the Chikuhō region. Most of the town area is mountainous.

=== Neighboring municipalities ===
Fukuoka Prefecture

- Kama
- Ōtō
- Soeda
- Tagawa

=== Climate ===
Kawasaki has a humid subtropical climate (Köppen Cfa) characterized by warm summers and cool winters with light to no snowfall. The average annual temperature in Kawasaki is 14.8 °C. The average annual rainfall is 1678 mm with September as the wettest month. The temperatures are highest on average in August, at around 26.5 °C, and lowest in January, at around 4.7 °C.

=== Demographics ===
Per Japanese census data, the population of Kawasaki is as shown below

Historical population
Year	Pop.	±%
1940	24,663	—
1950	37,638	+52.6%
1960	38,974	+3.5%
1970	23,190	−40.5%
1980	22,872	−1.4%
1990	22,046	−3.6%
2000	20,190	−8.4%
2010	18,275	−9.5%
2020	15,176	−17.0%

== History ==
The area of Kawasaki was part of ancient Buzen Province, and was part of the holdings of Kokura Domain during the Edo period. The village of Kawasaki was established on May 1, 1889 with the creation of the modern municipalities system. It was raised to town status on August 15, 1938. On September 20, 1960 the embankment of the Chumotoji River burst due to torrential rains and 67 people were killed when river water flowed into the Toyosu Coal Mine.

== Government ==
Kawasaki has a mayor-council form of government with a directly elected mayor and a unicameral town council of 16 members. Kawasaki, collectively with the other municipalities of Tagawa District contributes two members to the Fukuoka Prefectural Assembly. In terms of national politics, the town is part of the Fukuoka 11th district of the lower house of the Diet of Japan.

== Economy ==
During the Meiji period, Kawasaki, along with the other municipalities of the Chikuho area, developed with the Kitakyushu industrial zone through coal mining, and is still considered part of to the Greater Kitakyushu Metropolitan Area. However, as the demand for coal decreased due to the energy revolution, the coal mines that had sponsored prosperity have closed, leading to depopulation.

== Education ==
Kawasaki has four public elementary schools and one public junior high school operated by the town government. There is one private high school. There is also a special education school for the handicapped operated by the Fukuoka Prefectural Board of Education.

== Transportation ==
=== Railways ===
JR Kyushu - Hitahikosan Line

- Ikejiri - Buzen-Kawasaki

=== Highways ===
- Kyushu Expressway
- Higashikyushu Expressway
- National Route 322
