= Hitahikosan Line =

Railway line in Kyushu, Japan

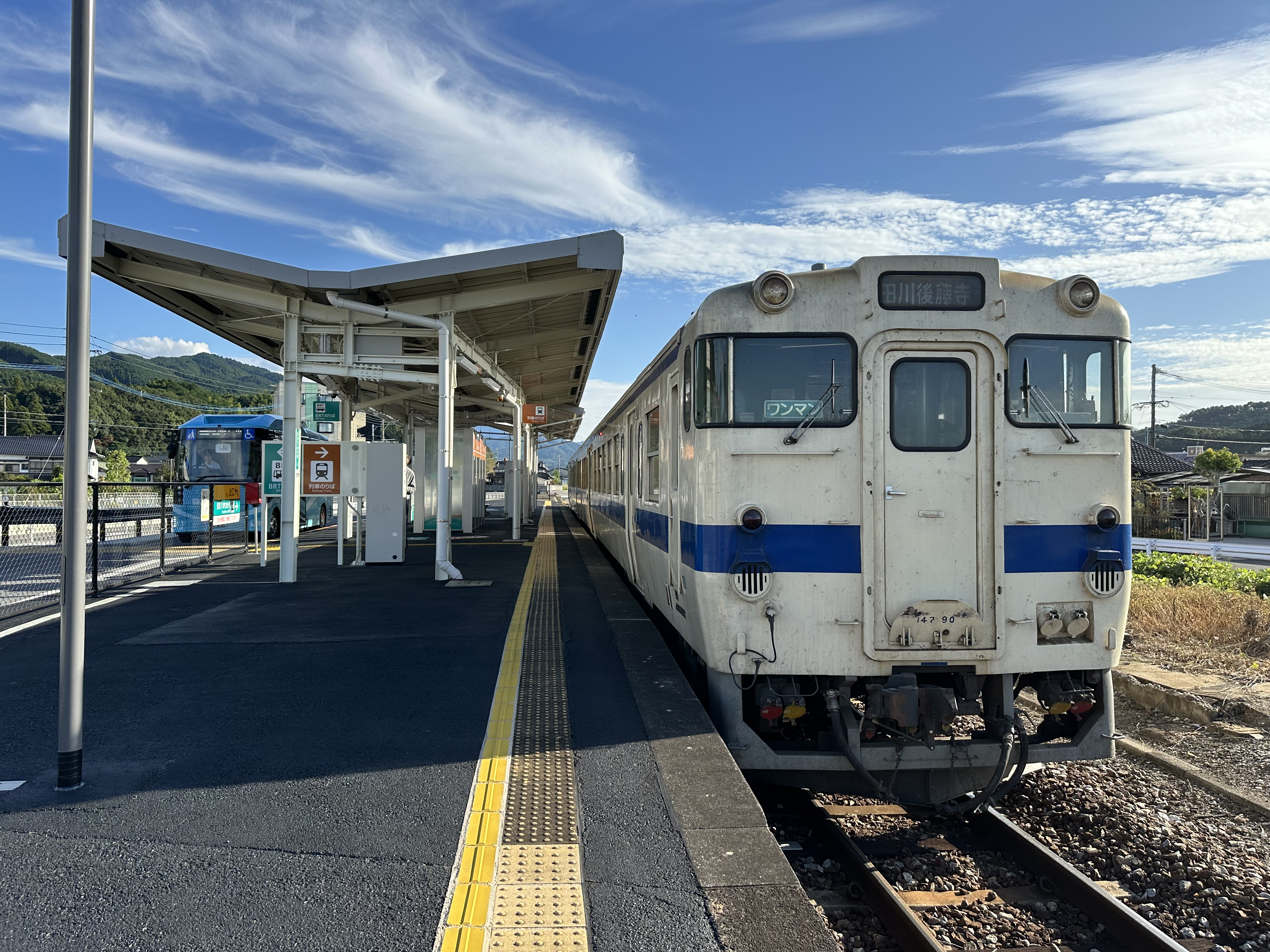

Overview
- Native name: 日田彦山線
- Status: In operation (as a railway between Jōno and Soeda) (as a bus route between Soeda and Yoake)
- Owner: JR Kyushu
- Locale: Kyushu
- Termini: Jōno; Yoake
- Stations: 23

Service
- Type: Regional rail
- Operator: JR Kyushu
- Rolling stock: KiHa 40 series DMU

History
- Opened: 1899; 127 years ago

Technical
- Line length: 68.7 km (42.7 mi)
- Number of tracks: 1
- Character: Mostly rural with a few urban areas
- Track gauge: 1,067 mm (3 ft 6 in)
- Electrification: None
- Operating speed: 85 km/h (53 mph)
Route map
Map railroad japan hitahikosan rough.png

The Hitahikosan Line (日田彦山線, Hitahikosan-sen) is a railway line in Japan, operated by Kyushu Railway Company (JR Kyushu). It connects Jōno Station in Kitakyushu, Fukuoka Prefecture with Soeda Station in Soeda, Fukuoka Prefecture.

Prior to 5 July 2017, the line continued from Soeda Station to Yoake Station in Hita, Ōita Prefecture. This section of the line features the 4,380 m (2.72 mi) Shakadake Tunnel between Chikuzen Iwaya and Hikosan station, where a fatal tunnel collapse occurred during construction in 1953, killing 21 construction workers. The line is named after Hita and Mount Hiko.

On 5 July 2017, torrential rainfall from Severe Tropical Storm Nanmadol (also known as Typhoon No. 3) resulted in the closure of the section of the line between Soeda and Yoake. The damage was severe and included the destruction of several bridges and parts of the track being washed away.

On 16 July 2020, JR Kyushu formally announced plans to permanently replace the section of railway line with a bus rapid transit (BRT) service. The BRT route, operated by JR Kyushu Bus Company, opened on 28 August 2020 under the name BRT Hikoboshi Line (BRTひこぼしライン, BRT Hikoboshi Rain) (also referred to as Hita Hikosan Line BRT).

== Stations ==
●: Stops, ｜: non-stop

No.	Station		Distance (km)	Rapid	Transfers	Location	
JF Nippō Main Line
JI 01	Kokura	小倉				Kokurakita-ku, Kitakyūshū	
JI 02	Nishi-Kokura	西小倉				Kokurakita-ku, Kitakyūshū	
JI 03	Minami-Kokura	南小倉				Kokurakita-ku, Kitakyūshū	
JI Hitahikosan Line
JI 04	Jōno	城野	0.0	●	JF Nippō Main Line	Kokuraminami-ku, Kitakyūshū	Fukuoka Prefecture
JI 05	Ishida	石田	3.3	｜		Kokuraminami-ku, Kitakyūshū	Fukuoka Prefecture
JI 06	Shii-Kōen	志井公園	5.1	｜	Kitakyushu Monorail (Kikugaoka Station) - 400m away	Kokuraminami-ku, Kitakyūshū	Fukuoka Prefecture
JI 07	Shii	志井	6.8	｜		Kokuraminami-ku, Kitakyūshū	Fukuoka Prefecture
JI 08	Ishiharamachi	石原町	9.0	●		Kokuraminami-ku, Kitakyūshū	Fukuoka Prefecture
JI 09	Yobuno	呼野	12.3	｜		Kokuraminami-ku, Kitakyūshū	Fukuoka Prefecture
JI 10	Saidōsho	採銅所	18.1	｜		Kawara	Fukuoka Prefecture
JI 11	Kawara	香春	23.4	●		Kawara	Fukuoka Prefecture
JI 12	Ipponmatsu	一本松	25.0	｜		Kawara	Fukuoka Prefecture
JI 13	Tagawa-Ita	田川伊田	27.4	●	Heisei Chikuhō Railway: ■ Ita Line ■ Tagawa Line	Tagawa	Fukuoka Prefecture
JI 14	Tagawa-Gotōji	田川後藤寺	30.0	●	JJ Gotōji Line; Heisei Chikuhō Railway: ■ Itoda Line	Tagawa	Fukuoka Prefecture
	Ikejiri	池尻	32.2	｜		Kawasaki	Fukuoka Prefecture
	Buzen-Kawasaki	豊前川崎	34.7	●		Kawasaki	Fukuoka Prefecture
	Nishi-Soeda	西添田	38.3	｜		Soeda	Fukuoka Prefecture
	Soeda	添田	39.5	●	Hikoboshi BRT	Soeda	Fukuoka Prefecture

=== Stations closed after 5 July 2017 ===
Station		Distance (km)	Rapid	Transfers	Location	
Kanyūsha-Hikosan	歓遊舎ひこさん	41.6			Soeda	Fukuoka Prefecture
Buzen-Masuda	豊前桝田	43.2			Soeda	Fukuoka Prefecture
Hikosan	彦山	47.2			Soeda	Fukuoka Prefecture
Chikuzen-Iwaya	筑前岩屋	55.1			Tōhō	Fukuoka Prefecture
Daigyōji	大行司	59.3			Tōhō	Fukuoka Prefecture
Hōshuyama	宝珠山	61.3			Tōhō	Fukuoka Prefecture
Ōtsuru	大鶴	62.9			Hita	Ōita Prefecture
Imayama	今山	65.4			Hita	Ōita Prefecture
Yoake	夜明	68.7		■ Kyūdai Main Line	Hita	Ōita Prefecture

== Rolling stock ==
- KiHa 40 series 2-car DMU

== Photo gallery ==
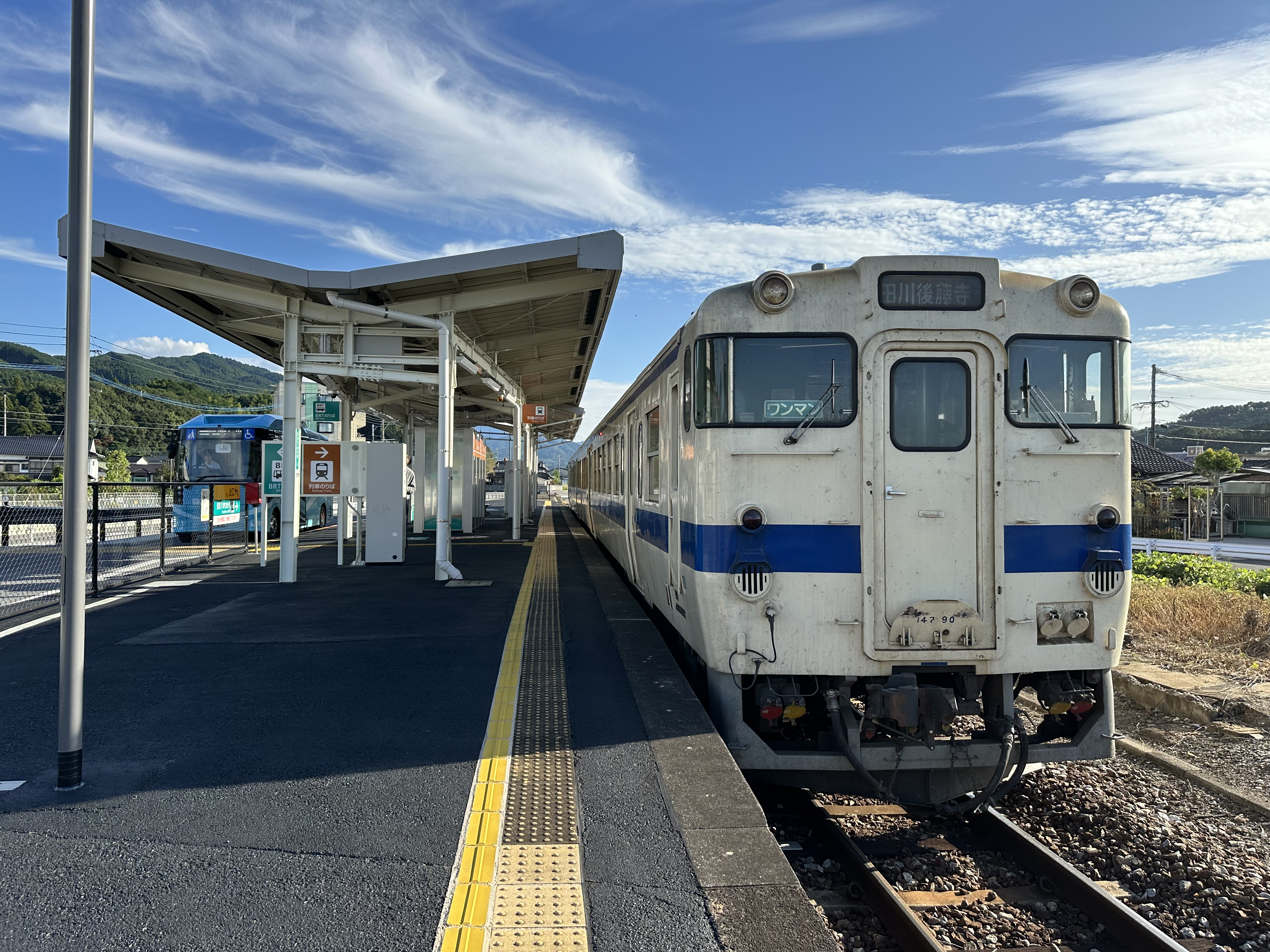
KiHa 40 DMU at Soeda Station, alongside Hikoboshi Line BRT bus

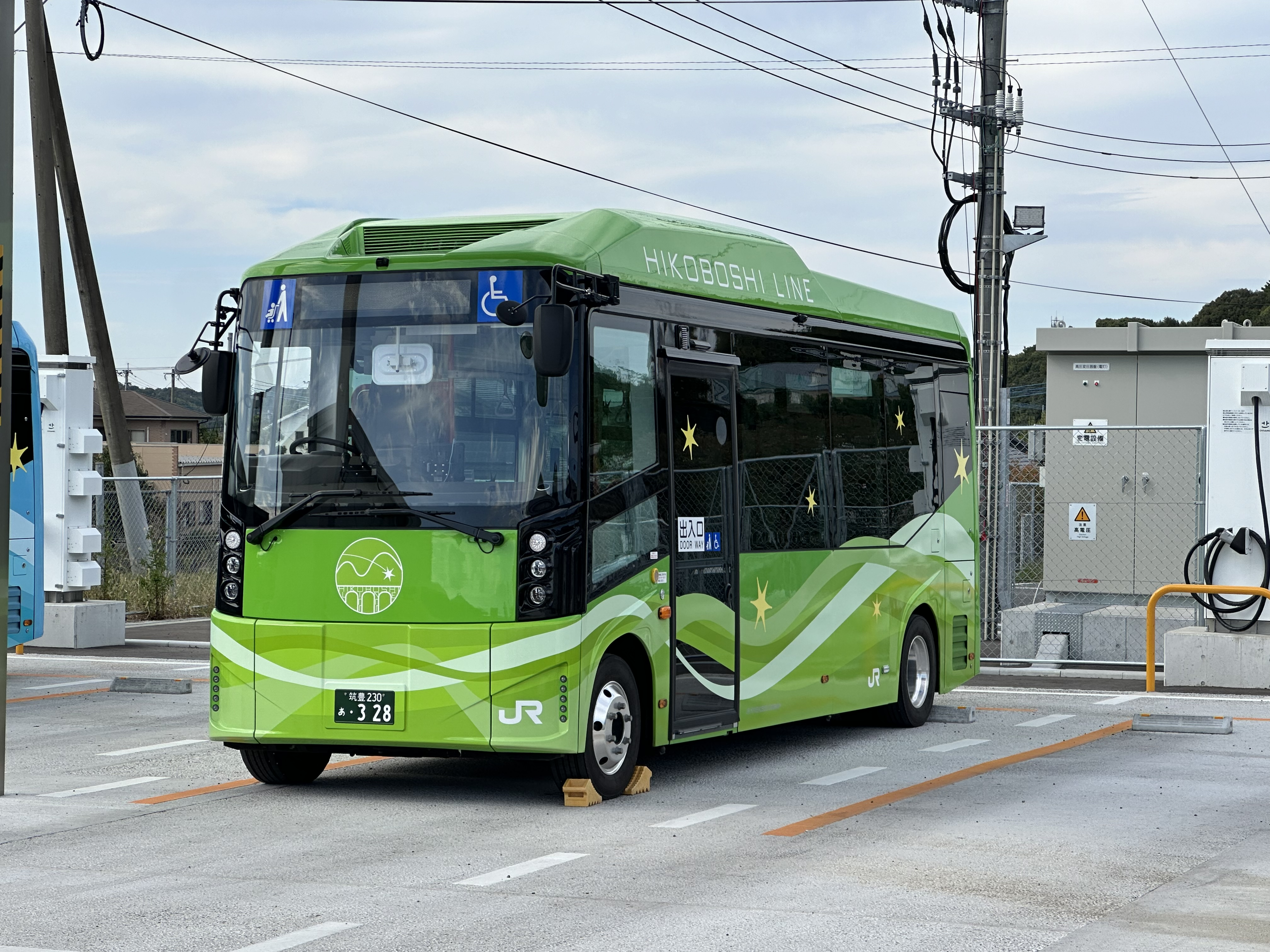
Hikoboshi Line BRT bus (BYD J7) at Soeda Station

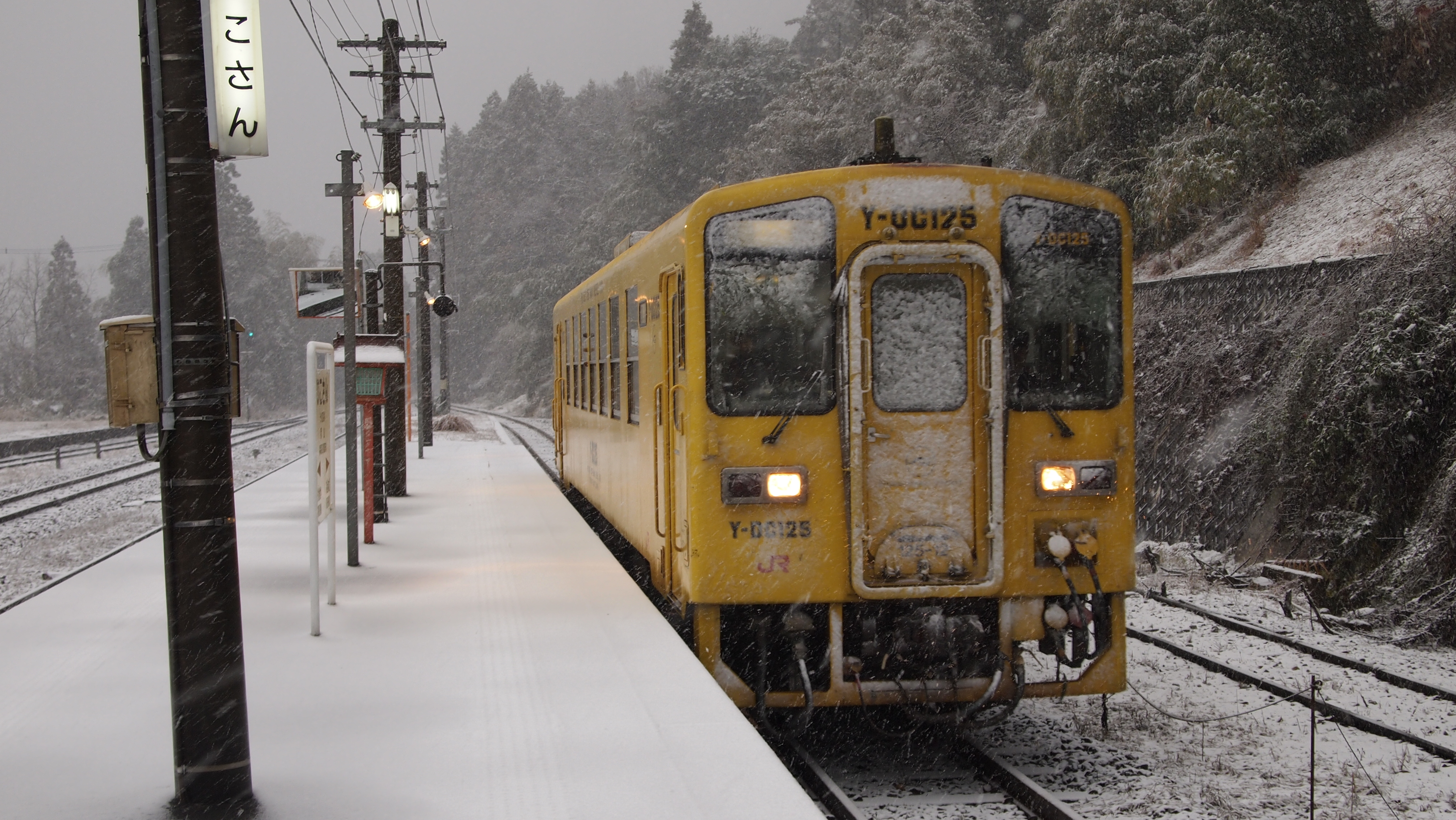
KiHa 125 DMUs previously operated on the Hitahikosan Line

== History ==
On 1 April 1960, the Hitahikosan Line was formed by a merger of the following lines:

- Main line
  - Jōno – Kawara and Soeda – Yoake sections of the Hita Line (the remaining Kawara – Soeda section became the Soeda Line)
  - Kawara – Ita branch of the Hita Line
  - Ita – Soeda section of the Tagawa Line (the Yukuhashi – Kawara section remained as the Tagawa Line)
- Branches
  - Ishida – Higashi-Kokura freight branch of the Hita Line
  - Buszen-Kawasaki – Daiichi-Ōtō freight branch of the Tagawa Line
  - Buszen-Kawasaki – Daini-Ōtō freight branch of the Tagawa Line

All the branches were abolished in 1962, 1974 and 1970 respectively. In 1987, the Japanese National Railways was privatized and the line was succeeded by JR Kyushu.

=== Construction ===
The Hōshū Railway opened the Tagawa-Ita - Buzen Kawasaki section as part of the Tagawa Line in 1899. That company merged with the Kyushu Railway Company in 1901, which extended the line to Soeda in 1903. The company was nationalised in 1907.

The Jono - Tagawa-Ita section was opened in 1915 by the Kokura Railway Co., that company being nationalised in 1943. The Soeda - Daigyoji section opened between 1937 and 1946, and the Daigyoji - Yoake section opened in 1956.

CTC signalling was introduced on the entire line in 1984. Freight service ceased beyond Tagawa-Gotōji in 1986, and totally in 1999.

=== Typhoon damage ===
On 5 July 2017, torrential rainfall from Severe Tropical Storm Nanmadol (also known as Typhoon No. 3) resulted in the closure of the section of the line between Soeda and Yoake. The damage was severe and included the destruction of several bridges and parts of the track being washed away. The line remained disconnected as of the start of 2020. On 12 February 2020, it was proposed by JR Kyushu to not restore the rail service, due to low passenger use and high maintenance costs, and permanently replace it with bus rapid transit (BRT). On 16 July, JR Kyushu formally announced plans to convert this section of the line to a BRT service.

The BRT route opened on 28 August 2020 under the name BRT Hikoboshi Line. With the opening of the line, the number of stations along the route increased from 12 to 36, although travel times roughly doubled. Following the partial conversion of JR East's Ōfunato Line and Kesennuma Line in the Tōhoku region, the line is Japan's third rail service to be converted to BRT.

=== Former connecting lines ===
Buzen Kawasaki Station: The 26 km Kamiyamada Line opened from Iizuka (on the Chikuho Main Line) to Shimoyamada in 1898, extended to Kamiyamada in 1929 and to Buzen Kawasaki (as a passenger-only section) in 1966. Freight services ceased in 1980, and the line closed in 1988. This line had two connections:

- A 2 km 3 ft (914 mm) gauge line from Okuma (16 km from Buzen Kawasaki) - Okumamachi operated between 1924 and 1933.
- The 8 km Urushio line from Shimokamoo (14 km from Buzen Kawasaki) - Shimayamada (connecting to the Gotoji Line) opened in 1943, and closed in 1986.

Soeda station - The Kokura Railway Co. opened a line to Ipponmatsu in 1915. The line was nationalised in 1943 and closed in 1985.
