= Soeda, Fukuoka =

Soeda 添田町
- Town
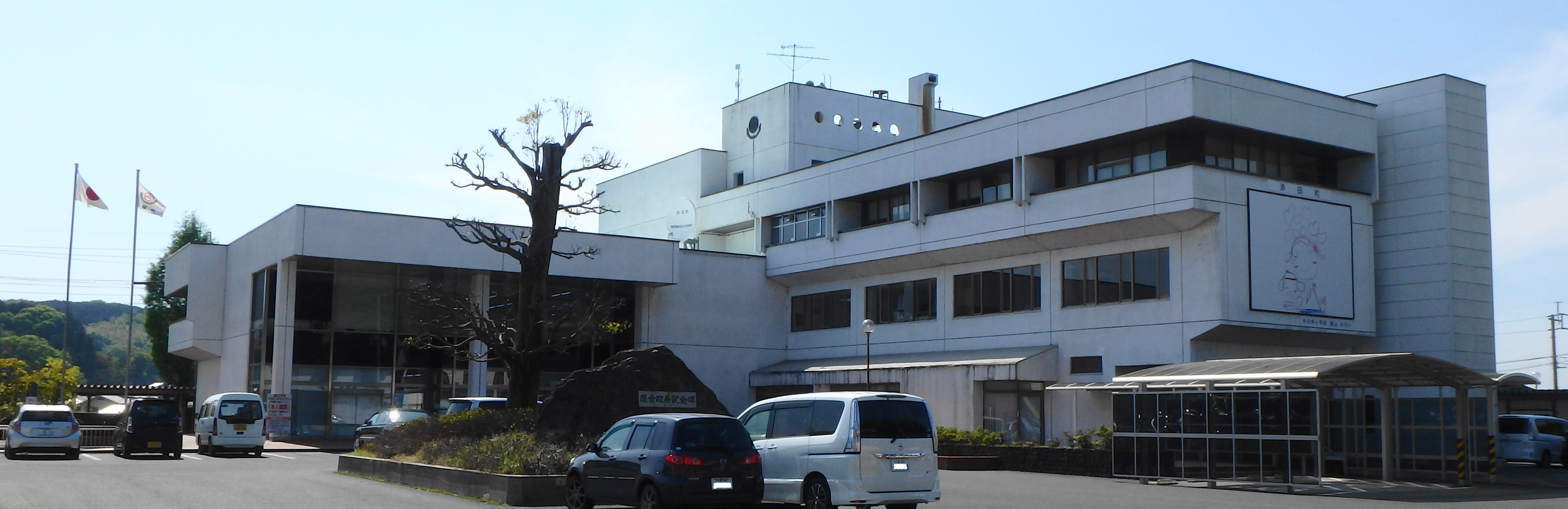
- Soeda Town Office

- Flag Emblem
- Location of Soeda in Fukuoka Prefecture

- Location in Japan
- Coordinates: 33°34′19″N 130°51′14″E
- Country: Japan
- Region: Kyushu
- Prefecture: Fukuoka
- District: Tagawa

Area
  - Total: 132.20 km^{2} (51.04 sq mi)

Population (March 31, 2023)
  - Total: 8,725
  - Density: 66.00/km^{2} (170.9/sq mi)
- Time zone: UTC+09:00 (JST)
- City hall address: 2151 Soeda, Soeda-cho, Tagawa-gun, Fukuoka-ken 824-0691
- Climate: Cfa
- Website: Official website
- Symbols
- Flower: Rhododendron subg. Hymenanthes
- Tree: Fagaceae

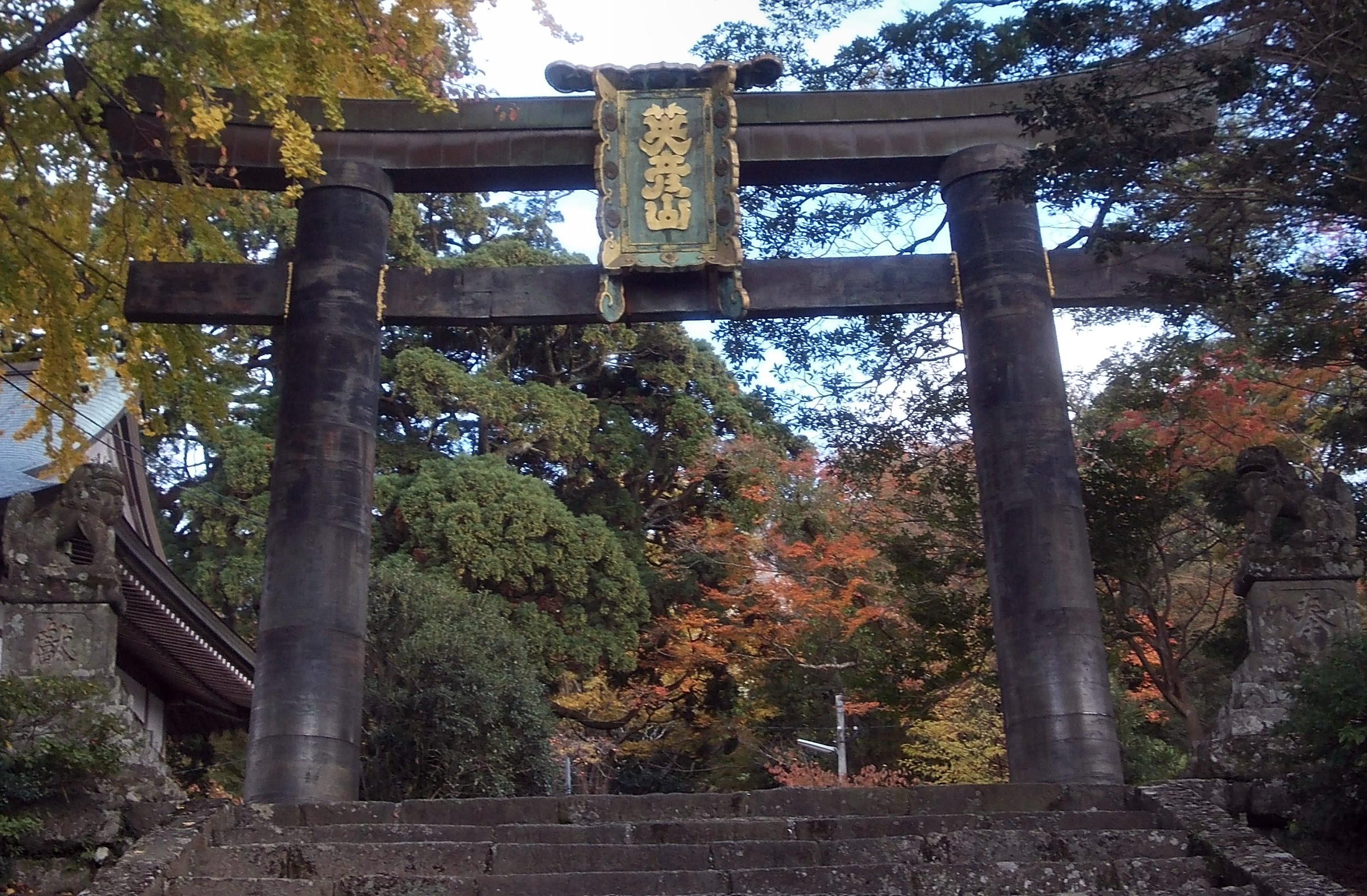
Hikosan Jingu

Soeda (添田町, Soeda-machi) is a town located in Tagawa District, Fukuoka Prefecture, Japan. As of 31 March 2023, the town had an estimated population of 8725 in 4496 households, and a population density of 66 persons per km^{2}. The total area of the town is 132.20 km^{2} (51.04 sq mi).

== Geography ==
Soeda is located in the southeastern part of the Chikuhō region, in the southern part of Tagawa District, and borders Oita Prefecture in the Chikushi Mountains, which is home to a series of mountains such as Mt. Hiko. The Aburagi Dam is located in the upper reaches of the Imagawa River, and much of the town is in the mountains.

=== Neighboring municipalities ===
Fukuoka Prefecture

- Aka
- Kawasaki
- Kama
- Miyako
- Ōtō
- Tōhō

Ōita Prefecture

- Hiji
- Nakatsu

=== Climate ===
Soeda has a humid subtropical climate (Köppen: Cfa). The average annual temperature in Soeda is 15.3 °C (59.5 °F). The average annual rainfall is 1,970.5 mm (77.58 in) with July as the wettest month. The temperatures are highest on average in August, at around 26.5 °C (79.7 °F), and lowest in January, at around 4.7 °C (40.5 °F). The highest temperature ever recorded in Soeda was 38.1 °C (100.6 °F) on 27 July 2026 and 3 August 2026; the coldest temperature ever recorded was −7.5 °C (18.5 °F) on 9 January 2021.

Climate data for Soeda (1991−2020 normals, extremes 1977−present)
Month	Jan	Feb	Mar	Apr	May	Jun	Jul	Aug	Sep	Oct	Nov	Dec	Year
Record high °C (°F)	20.4 (68.7)	23.7 (74.7)	26.8 (80.2)	29.9 (85.8)	32.6 (90.7)	35.9 (96.6)	38.1 (100.6)	38.1 (100.6)	36.8 (98.2)	33.2 (91.8)	26.5 (79.7)	23.6 (74.5)	38.1 (100.6)
Mean daily maximum °C (°F)	9.0 (48.2)	10.5 (50.9)	14.2 (57.6)	19.8 (67.6)	24.7 (76.5)	27.1 (80.8)	31.0 (87.8)	32.0 (89.6)	28.0 (82.4)	22.8 (73.0)	17.0 (62.6)	11.4 (52.5)	20.6 (69.1)
Daily mean °C (°F)	4.7 (40.5)	5.6 (42.1)	8.8 (47.8)	13.8 (56.8)	18.5 (65.3)	22.0 (71.6)	25.9 (78.6)	26.5 (79.7)	22.6 (72.7)	17.2 (63.0)	11.8 (53.2)	6.7 (44.1)	15.3 (59.6)
Mean daily minimum °C (°F)	0.9 (33.6)	1.2 (34.2)	4.0 (39.2)	8.4 (47.1)	13.1 (55.6)	17.9 (64.2)	22.2 (72.0)	22.5 (72.5)	18.7 (65.7)	12.8 (55.0)	7.5 (45.5)	2.7 (36.9)	11.0 (51.8)
Record low °C (°F)	−7.5 (18.5)	−6.6 (20.1)	−5.8 (21.6)	−0.8 (30.6)	4.1 (39.4)	7.7 (45.9)	12.6 (54.7)	14.6 (58.3)	7.2 (45.0)	2.2 (36.0)	−0.6 (30.9)	−4.6 (23.7)	−7.5 (18.5)
Average precipitation mm (inches)	79.7 (3.14)	84.8 (3.34)	129.1 (5.08)	142.6 (5.61)	159.8 (6.29)	327.2 (12.88)	364.4 (14.35)	213.8 (8.42)	204.0 (8.03)	100.1 (3.94)	92.8 (3.65)	74.7 (2.94)	1,970.5 (77.58)
Average precipitation days (≥ 1.0 mm)	11.0	10.4	11.3	10.7	9.8	13.4	13.6	10.9	10.7	7.7	9.1	10.0	128.6
Mean monthly sunshine hours	104.5	117.0	154.6	189.3	201.4	134.2	165.3	194.3	148.9	169.6	135.8	111.0	1,825.9
Source: Japan Meteorological Agency

=== Demographics ===
Per Japanese census data, the population of Soeda in 2020 is 8,801 people. Soeda has been conducting censuses since 1920.

Historical population
Year	Pop.	±%
1920	33,418	—
1925	19,936	−40.3%
1930	20,063	+0.6%
1935	20,186	+0.6%
1940	23,022	+14.0%
1945	25,249	+9.7%
1950	27,658	+9.5%
1955	27,978	+1.2%
1960	25,170	−10.0%
1965	20,067	−20.3%
1970	16,810	−16.2%
1975	16,006	−4.8%
1980	16,196	+1.2%
1985	15,662	−3.3%
1990	14,632	−6.6%
1995	13,763	−5.9%
2000	12,750	−7.4%
2005	11,810	−7.4%
2010	10,913	−7.6%
2015	9,924	−9.1%
2020	8,801	−11.3%
Soeda population statistics

== History ==
The area of Soeda was part of ancient Buzen Province, and artifacts from as early as the late Jōmon period have been found within town limits, including large jade stones which had been imported from distance Itoigawa, Niigata. During the Edo Period, the area was part of the holdings of Kokura Domain. The village of Soeda was established on May 1, 1889, with the creation of the modern municipalities system. It was raised to town status on April 1, 1912. On February 11, 1942, Soeds annexed the neighboring village Hikoyama, and on January 1, 1955, the village of Tsuno. The town was severely damaged by torrential rains on July 5, 2017.

== Government ==
Soeda has a mayor-council form of government with a directly elected mayor and a unicameral town council of 11 members. Soeda, collectively with the other municipalities of Tagawa District contributes two members to the Fukuoka Prefectural Assembly. In terms of national politics, the town is part of the Fukuoka 11th district of the lower house of the Diet of Japan.

== Economy ==
During the Meiji period, Soeda, along with the other municipalities of the Chikuho area, developed with the Kitakyushu industrial zone through coal mining, and is still considered part of to the Greater Kitakyushu Metropolitan Area. However, as the demand for coal decreased due to the energy revolution, the coal mines that had sponsored prosperity have all closed, leading to depopulation. The main economic activity is now agriculture.

== Education ==
Soeda has four public elementary high schools and one public junior high school operated by the town government and one public high school operated by the Fukuoka Prefectural Board of Education.

== Transportation ==
=== Railways ===
JR Kyushu - Hitahikosan Line

- Nishi-Soeda - Soeda - < Kanyūsha-Hikosan - Buzen-Masuda - Hikosan >

=== Highways ===
- Kyushu Expressway
- Higashikyushu Expressway
- Ōita Expressway
- National Route 500

== Sister cities ==
- Ganghwa County (Incheon, Republic of Korea)

== Local attractions ==
- Hikosan Jingū
- Mount Hiko
