= Aburagi Dam =

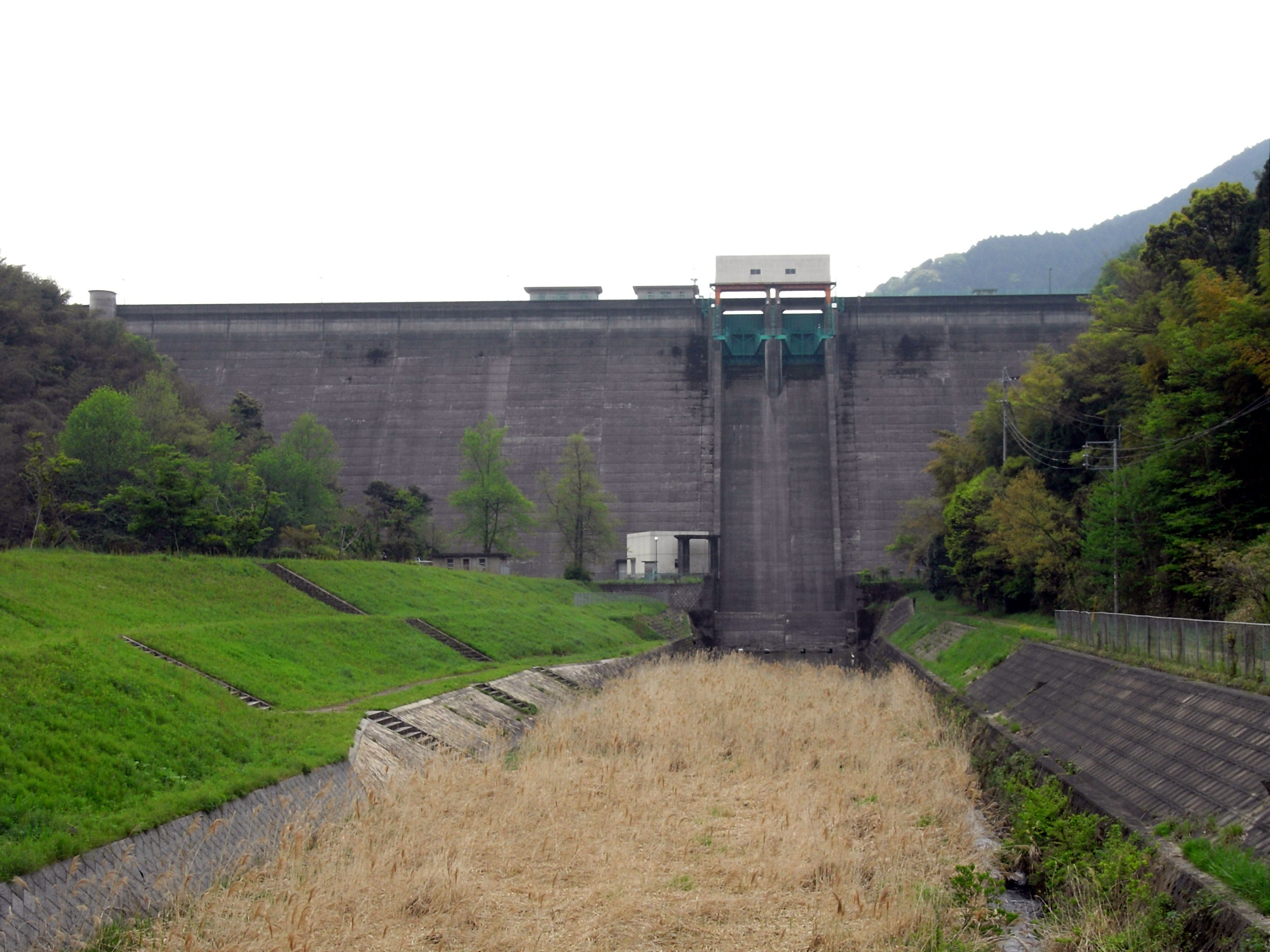
- Interactive map of Aburagi Dam
- Location: Soeda, Tagawa District, Fukuoka Prefecture, Japan
- Coordinates: 33°33′21″N 130°53′38″E
- Construction began: 1963
- Opening date: 1971
- Owner: Fukuoka Prefecture

Dam and spillways
- Type of dam: Concrete gravity dam
- Impounds: Imagawa River
- Height: 54.6 m (179 ft)
- Length: 218.0 m (715.2 ft)
- Dam volume: 175,000 m^{3}

Reservoir
- Creates: Aburagi Dam reservoir
- Total capacity: 18,200,000 m^{3} total, 17,450,000 m^{3} active
- Catchment area: 32.6 km^{2}
- Surface area: 93.0 ha

Power Station
- Operator: Kitakyushu City Waterworks Bureau
- Installed capacity: 780 kW
- Purposes: Flood control, unspecified water use, tap water, industrial water, hydroelectricity

Aburagi Dam (油木ダム) is a dam built upstream on the class-B Imagawa River, located in the town of Soeda, in the Tagawa District of Fukuoka Prefecture, Japan.

It is a gravity dam made of concrete, 54.6 meters in height. The dam is owned at a prefectural level but managed by the Tagawa Public Works Office in Fukuoka Prefecture. An auxiliary multi-purpose dam, Aburagi Dam provides flood control for the Imagawa River and agricultural irrigation for the Tagawa District, as well as general irrigation for Kitakyūshū and the Miyako District. It is also a major supplier of water to Kitakyūshū. The reservoir created by the dam remains unnamed, despite having been completed nearly 40 years ago.

== Geography ==
The Imagawa River is a medium-sized, class-B river covering 120.0 square kilometers, extending 38.7 kilometers in length. It is located in the Buzen district of Fukuoka Prefecture, and is representative of other class-B rivers like the Murasakigawa River and Haraigawa River. The source of the river is at the base of a sightseeing area—Mount Hiko—which is located in Yaba-Hita-Hikosan Quasi-National Park. The river flows northeast, pouring into the Suonada Sound near the city of Yukihashi. The watershed crosses the city of Yukihashi, as well as the Kyoto District's towns of Kanda and Miyako and the Tagawa District's town of Soeda and Aka village, and serves as an important water source. The dam is built on the upper reach of the river at the town of Soeda and the former village of Tsuno.

== History ==
After the (then-government managed) Yawata Works steel company commenced operations in the Kitakyūshū area, the heavy chemical industry rapidly began the flourish, and the local population increased. The supply of water established during the Meiji period had become insufficient, leading Yawata Works to construct several dams to supply municipal water, such as the Kawachi Dam. This area experiences Setonaikai climate patterns, with low annual rainfall, and frequently faces water shortages; the expansion of the Kitakyūshū Industrial Zone further worsened these water shortages. The river basin was once part of the Ogasawara clan's Kokura Domain, a grain producing region where some 150,000 units of grain were produced annually. However, due to the aforementioned Setonaikai climate, farmwater was in extremely short supply. To help alleviate the problem, the Kyoto and Tagawa districts had several agricultural-use reservoirs built, but this wasn't a fundamental solution to the problem.

Maintenance of the Imagawa River hadn't progressed by much. While the area normally suffered from water damage, the June 1953 Kitakyūshū Flood wreaked havoc upon the Chikugogawa, Ongagawa, and many other rivers in the Kitakyūshū area. Many levees were destroyed, causing substantial destruction. Due to the damage caused by the heavy rains, the Ministry of Construction (now the Ministry of Land, Infrastructure, Transport and Tourism) began the Comprehensive River Development Project for the Chikugogawa River; the project was widely expanded to cover repairs to the Ongagawa River and Imagawa River basins in Fukuoka Prefecture, though comprehensive repairs to the Imagawa River basin proved difficult due to its relatively large population and abundance of farmlands.

In 1950, the second Yoshida cabinet enacted the Comprehensive National Land Development bill. The bill was meant to accelerate local development in an attempt to revitalize the exhausted Japanese economy after the Pacific War. The bill designated 22 localities for development as part of the "Special Regional Comprehensive Development Plan." "Tsushima," "Aso," and "Southern Kyūshū" were selected from within Kyūshū. To rebuild and strengthen the Kitakyūshū Industrial Zone—heavily damaged as a result of air raids during the war—the entire Kitakyūshū area was named under the Kitakyūshū Special Regional Comprehensive Development Plan. Irrigation improvements were concurrently planned, as securing water was necessary for industrial districts, as well as expanding farming areas to deal with food shortages. The plan was strengthened by the Japanese post-war economic recovery, and further expanded under the National Comprehensive Development Plan.

Based on this perspective, the Ongagawa, Murasakigawa and Imagawa River water systems—the largest rivers in Kitakyūshū—were at the center of the Comprehensive River Development Project, with flood prevention of the river basins, improved water supply, and expanded irrigation forming the heart of the project. Fukuoka Prefecture pressed forward with construction of multi-purpose dams, and with support from the national treasury, the Rikimaru Dam on the Yakiyamagawa River (part of the Ongagawa River water system), the Jinya Dam on the Chūganjigawa River, and the Masubuchi Dam on the Murasakigawa River were planned. River development projects in the form of multi-purpose dams were also drawn up for the Imagawa River water system, and in 1965 a dam in Aburagi, which is in the Tagawa District's Tsuno, entered into construction under the Imagawa Comprehensive Development Project. This became Aburagi Dam.

== Compensation ==
Plans to build the dam were unveiled in 1961. The reasons for the selection of the specific location of the dam at a contracted point of the Imagawa River were that it was possible to secure an ample amount of active water storage capacity, and it was effective from a cost-performance perspective. However, after construction plans were unveiled, residents of the Tsuno area unanimously opposed the dam's creation. The reservoir area that would be created by the dam would be centered on Tsuno, and not only houses but town offices and public facilities would be submerged. Residents were fearful for their livelihoods, and requested large sums as compensation for relocation, complicating compensation negotiations. As the backer of the plan, Fukuoka Prefecture frequently entered into compensation negotiations, but talks continued at length for 3 years.

In March 1968, 7 years after the plan to build the dam was initially unveiled, representatives of the residents reached an agreement on compensation negotiations, and construction was authorized to commence. However, the construction of the dam meant that 155 city-maintained residencies, as well as the Soeda town Hall, Tsuno Branch Office, elementary and junior high schools, post office, police substation, fire department branch office, community center, and agricultural cooperative branch office would all become submerged. Aburagi was thus sacrificed for the development of Kitakyūshū. Construction began, and areas where the ground quality was poor were reinforced with water-impermeable concrete walls, eventually leading to the dam's completion in 1971, 9 years after construction plans were announced.

During dry periods, the former village of Tsuno—as well the bridge built across the Imagawa River and stone walls built around former residences—can still be seen sunken at the bottom of the dam. The submerged bridge across the Imagawa River actually became visible above the water during times of water shortage during 1994, and again in 2002 and 2007.

== Purpose ==
Aburagi Dam is used for flood control, unspecified water utilization, and tap water provision, as well as industrial water provision and hydroelectricity generation, making the dam's purposes numerous even among multi-purpose dams.

- Flood control: Using (prevention of) the June 1953 Kitakyūshū Flood as a flood control standard, Aburagi Dam enables floodwaters at 870 tons of water per second across the city of Saikawa to be cut by 260 tons per second, reducing the floodwater amount to 610 tons per second.
- Unspecified water utilization: The dam allows for the necessary water provision amount under customary water right levels across the Imagawa River basin, allowing for irrigation to cover 1,164 hectares of farmland.
- Tap water: According to the Kitakyushu City Waterworks Bureau, the dam provides Kitakyūshū with 85,000 tons of tap water per day; the city of Yukihashi and the town of Kanda are each provided with 20,000 tons of water per day.
- Industrial water: The dam provides the Kyōto district industrial region with 25,000 tons of water per day.
- Hydroelectricity: The Aburagi electric generation plant was built to utilize the water supply sent to Kitakyūshū, and is rated to produce 780 kilowatts, on par with other low-head hydro-power generators. This last purpose was added later after the recommendation from the Ministry of Economy, Trade and Industry—which administers electrical power generation—to further adoption of small-scale hydroelectric energy.

Based on these objectives, Aburagi Dam—along with Rikimaru Dam, Masubuchi Dam, the Tonda Reservoirs #1 and #2, Hata Dam, and Matsugae Dam—contributes to Kitakyūshū's water storage. Aburagi Dam, the Ongagawa River estuary barrage, Heisei Ozeki Dam, Yamakunigawa River's Yabakei Dam and other government-controlled dams provide a stable supply of water to Kitakyūshū and the Kitakyūshū Industrial Zone.

More recently, however, serious water shortages have occurred with more frequency as a result of intense heat, rainless rainy seasons, and the natural Setonaikai climate. Aburagi Dam has frequently been put under water restrictions; in response to these shortages, the Irahara Dam on the upper stream of the Haraigawa River (which is adjacent to the east of Imagawa River) is currently being constructed. The municipalities of the Keichiku region and Tagawa have been given priority water usage rights, as they have lacked any other large water source amid water shortages of recent years. During water shortages, the amount of water sent to Kitakyūshū is heavily cut and redirected to the undersupplied Keichiku region, but this is not a fundamental solution to the water shortage issue.

== Access ==
To access Aburagi Dam from Route 201 (Sasaguri Highway), transfer to Prefectural Highway 418 from central Kawara in the Tagawa District, and continue south toward Mount Hiko. From the city of Yukihashi, take the Yukihashi/Soeda Line on Fukuoka Prefectural Highway 34 westward toward the village of Aka, turn left at the village of Aka onto Prefectural Highway 418, and follow the road to Aburagi Dam. Using public transportation, take the Heisei Chikuhō Railway Tagawa Line and get off at Aka Station, or take the Kyushu Railway Company Hitahiko Line and get off at Soeda Station.
