= Soeda Station =

Railway station in Soeda, Fukuoka Prefecture, Japan

Soeda Station 添田駅
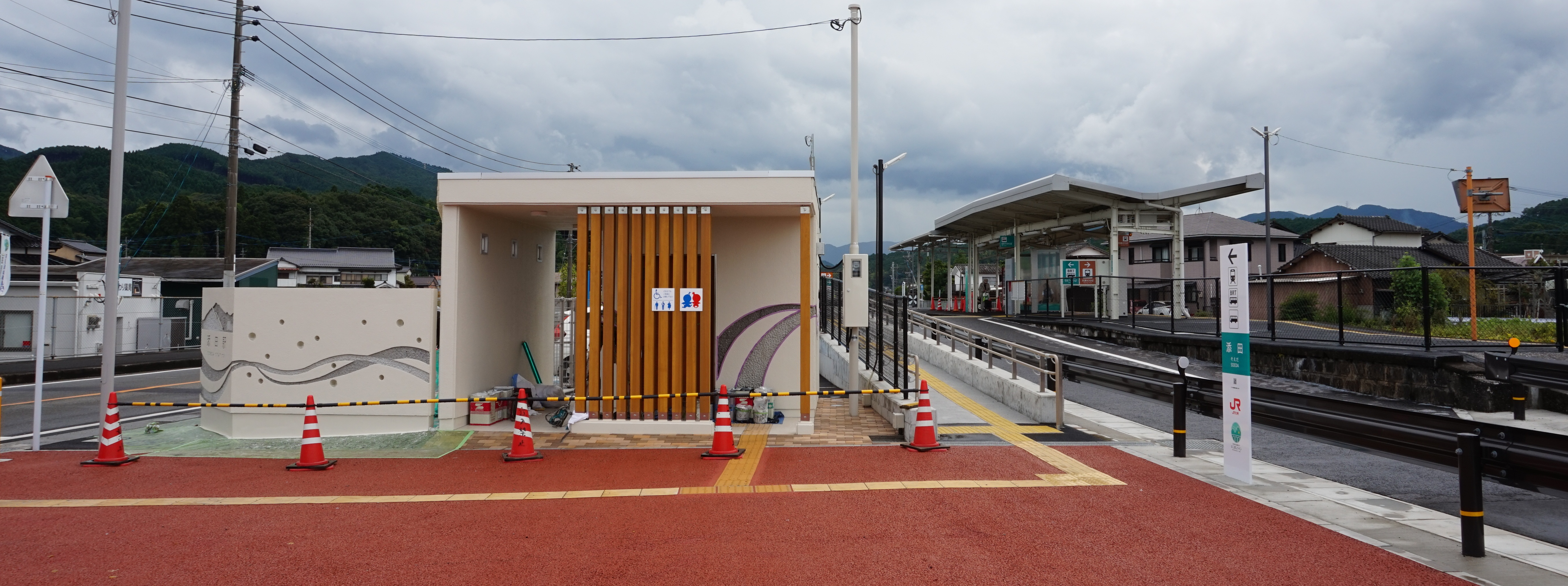
- Soeda Station entrance in 2023

General information
- Location: 1263-3 Soeda, Soeda-machi, Tagawa-gun, Fukuoka-ken 824-0602; Japan
- Coordinates: 33°34′04″N 130°51′23″E
- Operator: JR Kyushu
- Line: JI Hitahikosan Line
- Distance: 39.5 km from Jōno
- Platforms: 1 island platform
- Tracks: 1

Other information
- Status: Unstaffed
- Website: Official website

History
- Opened: 1 April 1915
- Former names: Kami-Soeda (to 1933); Hikosan-guchi (to 1942)

Services
Preceding station	JR Kyushu	Following station
Kanyūsha-Hikosan towards Yoake	Hitahikosan Line	Nishi-Soeda towards Kokura
Location
- Location within Fukuoka Prefecture Location within Japan

Soeda Station (添田駅, Soeda-eki) is a passenger railway station located in the town of Soeda, Fukuoka Prefecture, Japan. It is operated by JR Kyushu.

== Lines ==
The station is served by the Hitahikosan Line and is located 39.5 km from the starting point of the line at Jōno. Since July 2017, there has been no rail service south of Soeda to Yoake due to rainstorm damage. This section of the line was replaced by bus rapid transit (BRT) on 28 August 2023.

== Layout ==
The station consists of one island platform serving a single track. The opposite side of the platform is used for BRT operations, to permit the straight transfer of passengers from the train to the bus. Prior to the opening of the BRT, large-scale renovation work was carried out around the current platform and the area of the old station, and as a result the two-story reinforced concrete station building located far from the current platform. The station is unattended.

== Gallery ==
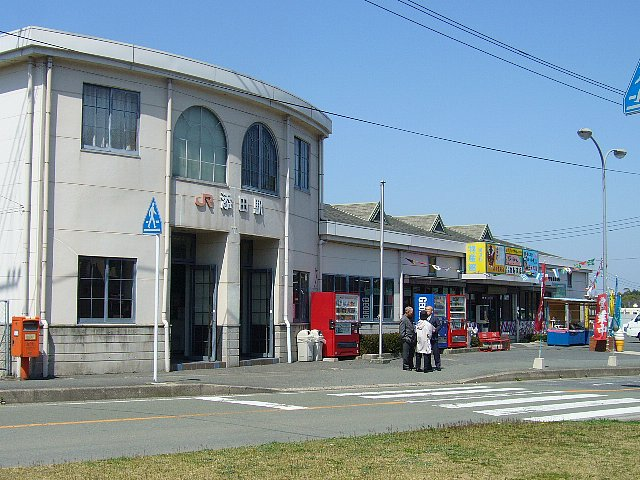
Soeda Station in March 2006

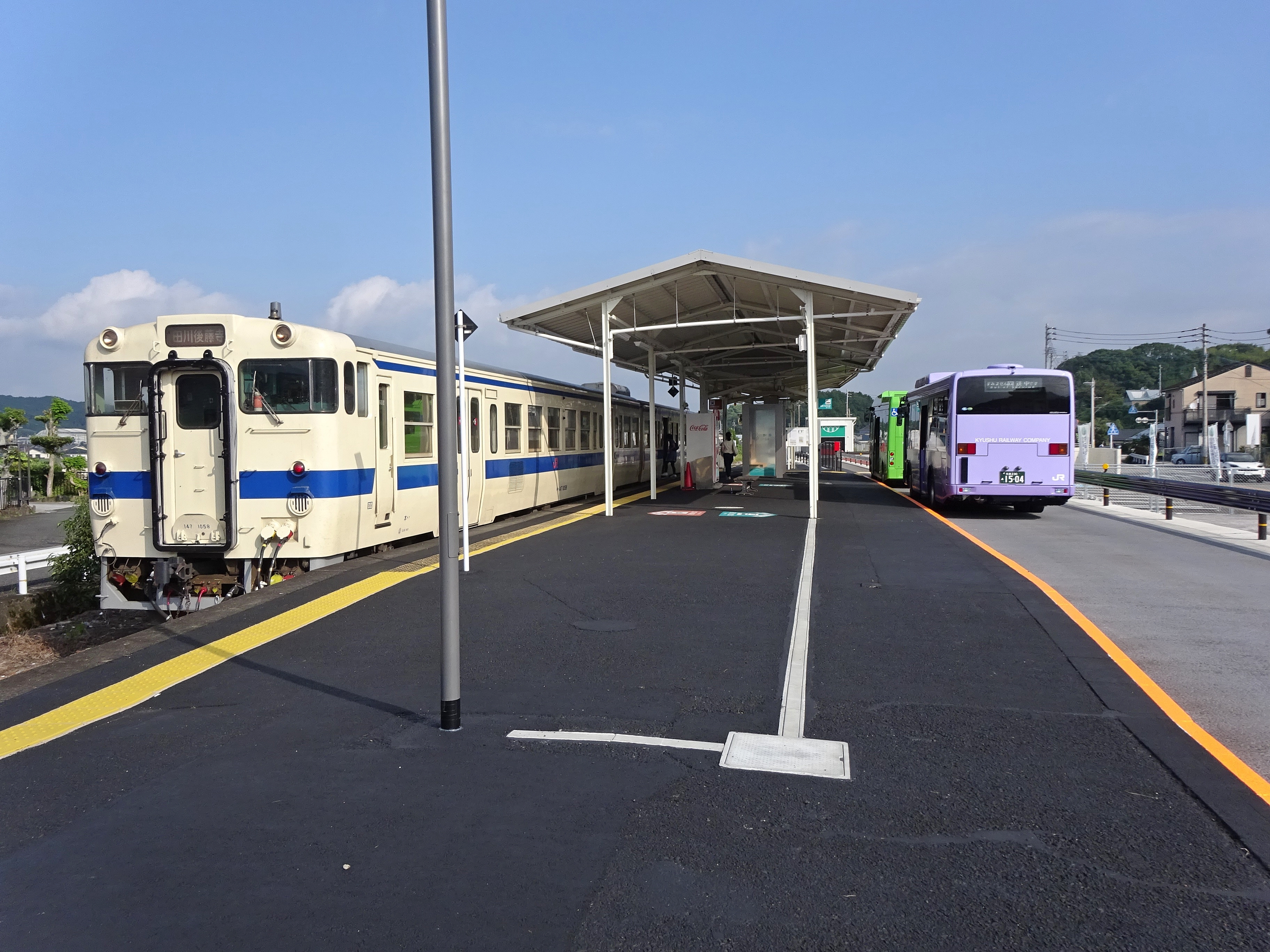
Relationship between Soeda Station platform and BRT

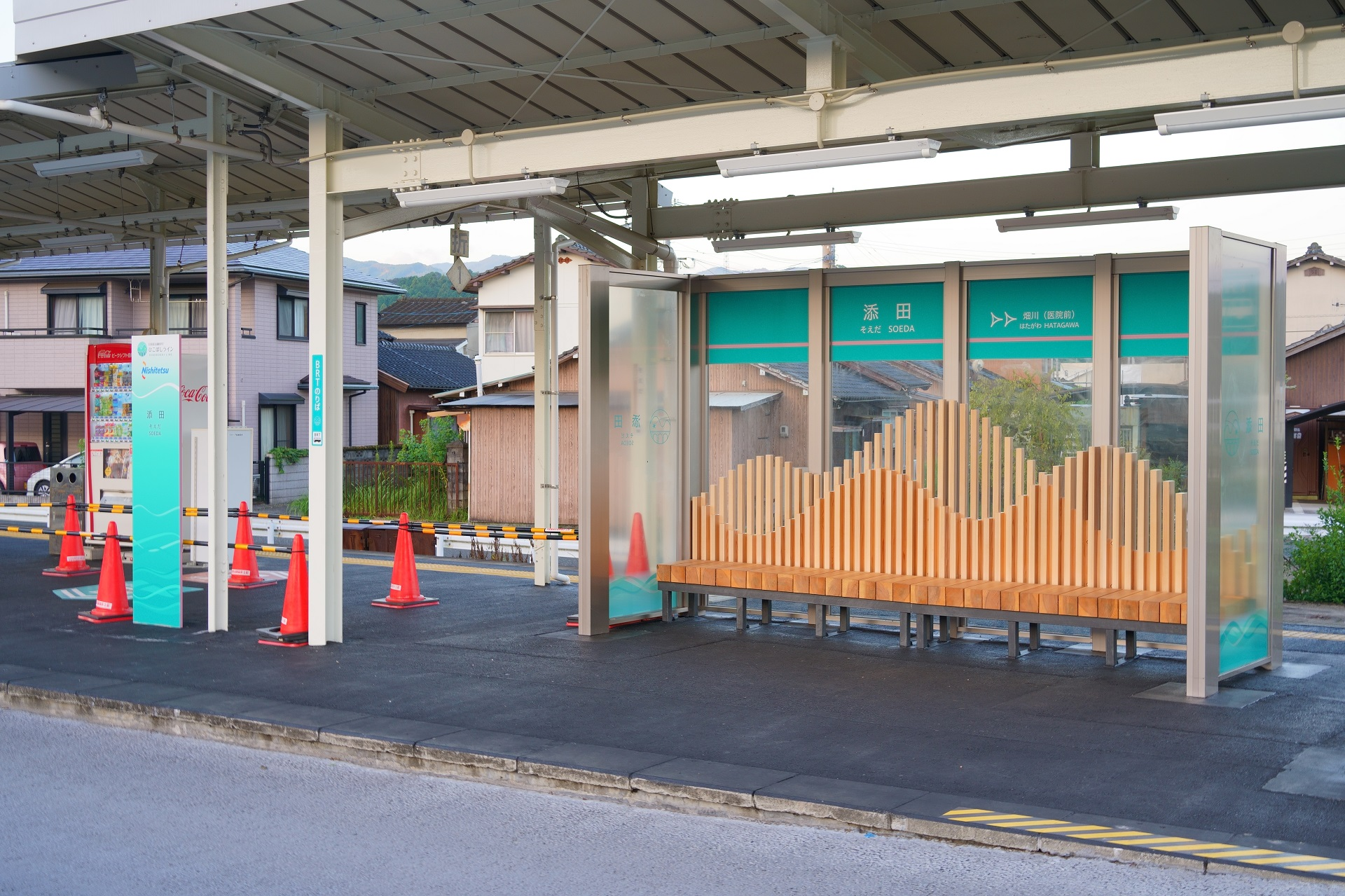
BRT Platform

== History ==
The station opened on 1 April 1915 as Kami-Soeda Station (上添田駅) on the Kokura Railway. It was renamed The station was renamed Hikosan-guchi Station (彦山口駅) in 1933. The Kokura Railway was nationalized on 1 August 1942 and the station renamed to its present name on 1 August 1942. On 1 April 1987, with the privatisation of the JNR, the station came under the control of JR Kyushu.

== Surrounding area ==
- Soeda Town Hall
- Soeda Town Soeda Elementary School
- Soeda Town Soeda Junior High School

== See also ==
- List of railway stations in Japan
