= Yoake Station =

Railway station in Hita, Ōita Prefecture, Japan

Yoake Station 夜明駅
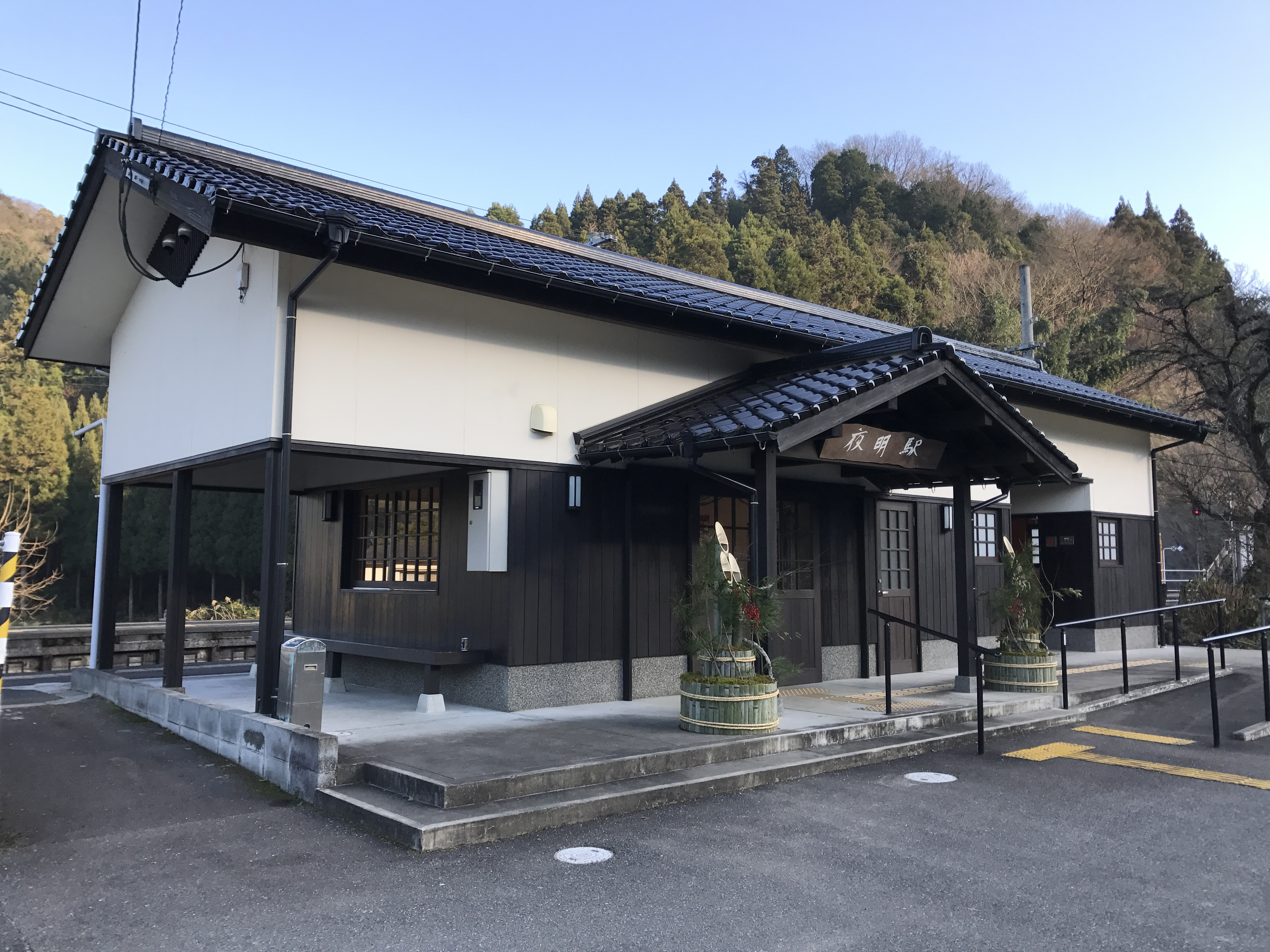
- Yoake Station in December 2016

General information
- Location: 1802 Yoake, Hita-shi, Ōita-ken 877-1112; Japan
- Coordinates: 33°19′11″N 130°51′58″E
- Operator: JR Kyushu
- Line: ■ Kyūdai Main Line
- Distance: 39.1 km from Kurume
- Platforms: 1 side + 1 island platforms
- Tracks: 3

Construction
- Structure type: At grade (side hill cutting)

Other information
- Status: Unstaffed
- Website: Official website

History
- Opened: 12 March 1932

Passengers
- FY2015: 36 daily

Services
| Preceding station | JR Kyushu | Following station |
|---|---|---|
| Chikugo-Ōishi towards Kurume | Kyūdai Main Line | Teruoka towards Ōita |
Location
- Location within Oita Prefecture Location within Japan

Yoake Station (夜明駅, Yoake-eki) is a passenger railway station operated by JR Kyushu in the city of Hita, Ōita Prefecture, Japan. It was formerly the junction between the Kyudai Main Line and the Hitahikosan Line.

== Lines ==
Yoake Station is served by the Kyūdai Main Line and is located 39.1 km from the starting point of the line at Kurume. It was the southern terminal station terminus of the 68.7 km Hitahikosan Line, connecting Hita with at Jōno; however, that line was discontinued after torrential rains damaged the track in July 2017, and was replaced by a Bus Rapid Transit (BRT) service in 2023.

== Layout ==
The station consists of two side platforms serving two tracks on a side hill cutting. The station building is a modern structure but built in traditional Japanese style with a tiled roof, tiled entrance portico and verandah at the side. It is unstaffed and serves only as a waiting room. A flight of steps leads up the side hill cutting to the station building from the access road (National Route 386). Access to the island platform is by means of a footbridge.

=== Platforms ===
| 1 | ■ ■ Kyūdai Main Line | for Kurume |
| 2 | ■ ■ Kyūdai Main Line | for Hita |

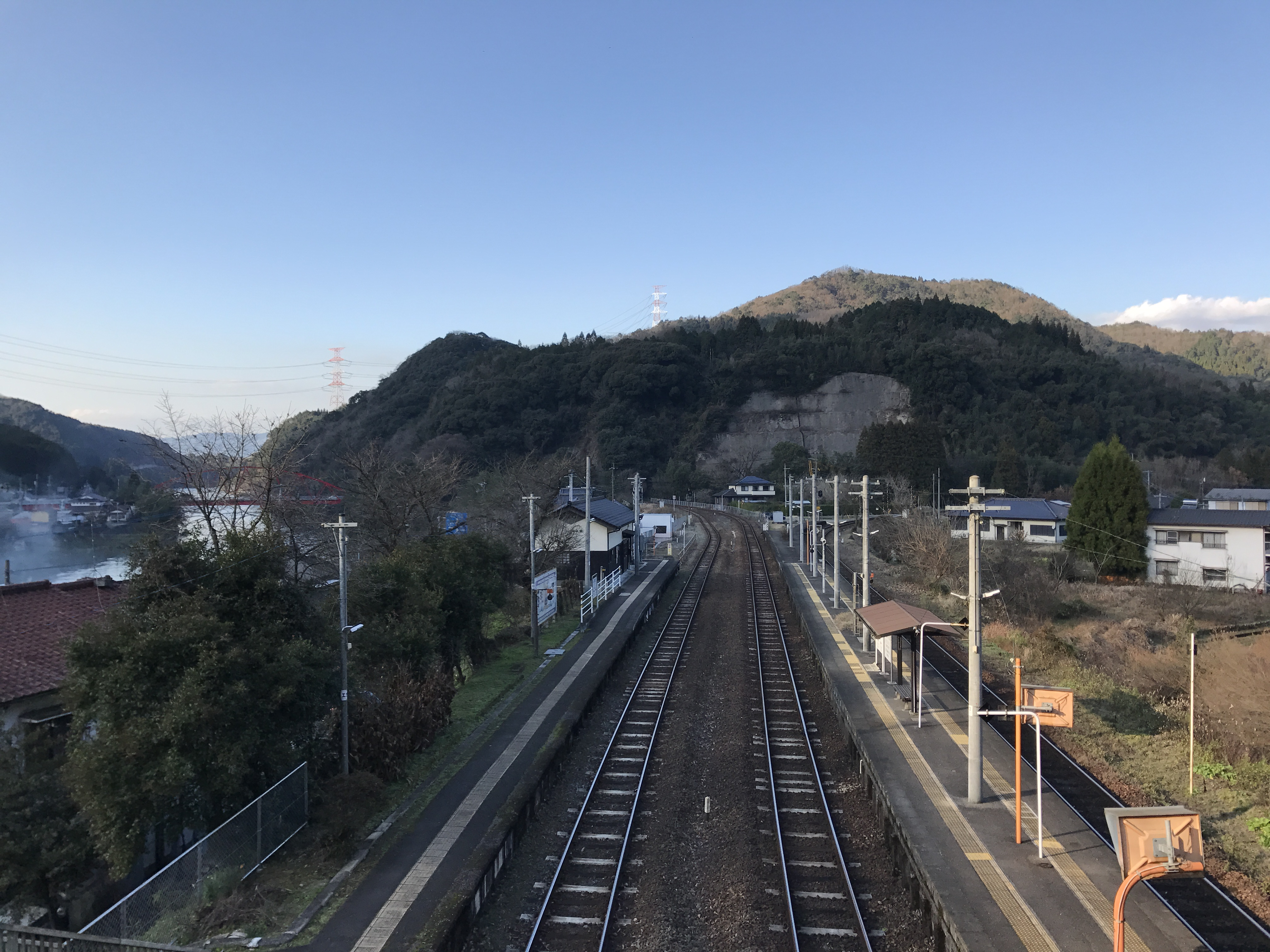
A view of the station platforms and tracks. The Hitahikosan Line can be seen turning off to the right.

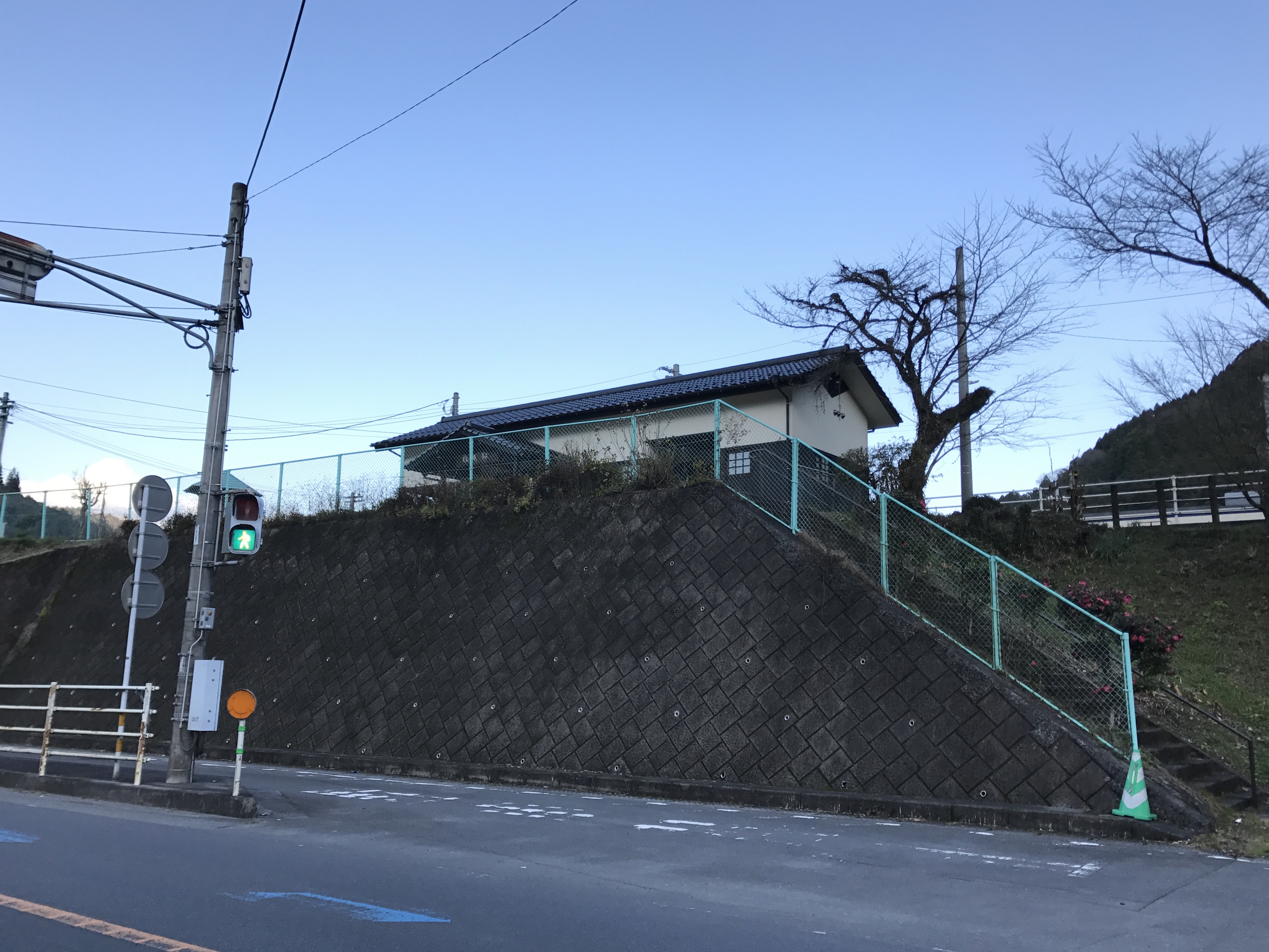
A view of the station building on the side hill cutting above National Route 386.

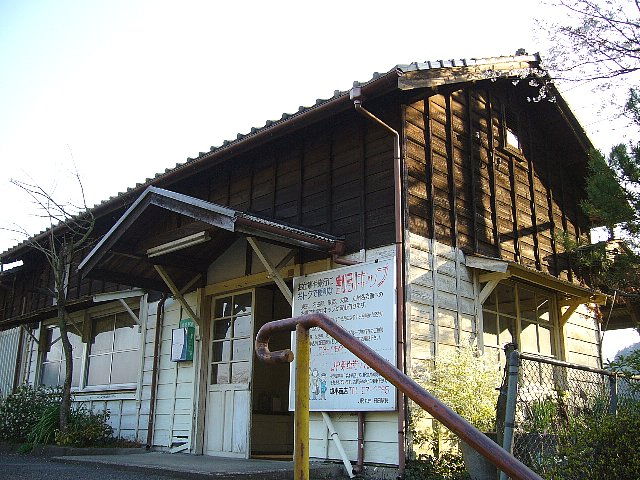
The old station building. This picture was taken in 2006.

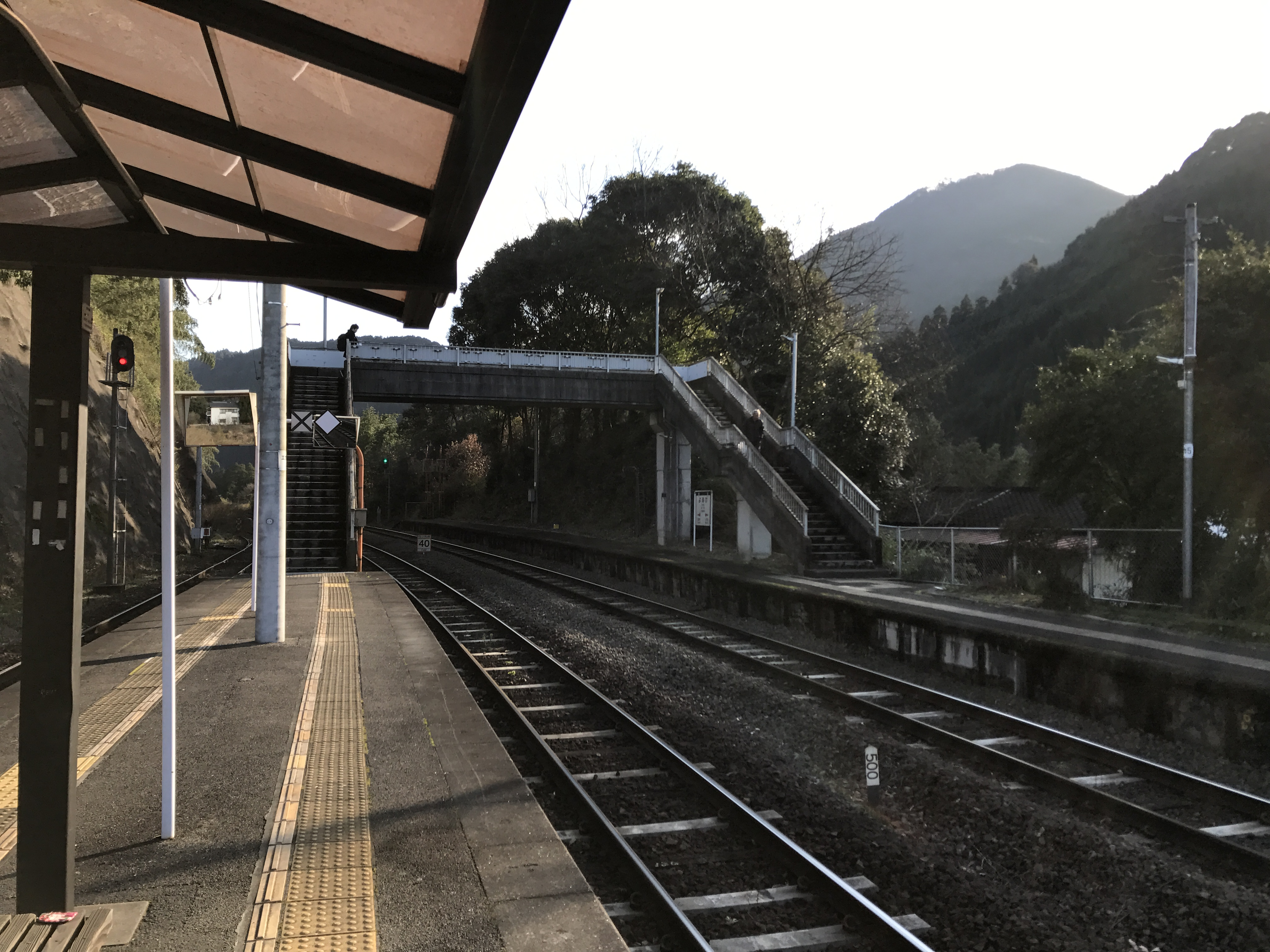
A close-in view of the footbridge.

== History ==
Japanese Government Railways (JGR) had opened the Kyudai Main Line on 24 December 1928 with a track between Kurume and Chikugo-Yoshii and had extended the line east to Chikugo-Ōishi by 11 July 1931. In a further phase of expansion, the track was extended east with Yoake opening as the eastern terminus on 12 March 1932. It became a through-station on 3 March 1934 when the track was extended to Hita. On 22 August 1937 JGR opened the Hitosan Line from Yoake north to Hōshuyama. On 1 April 1960, this track was linked to tracks further north and became part of the Hitahikosan Line. With the privatization of Japanese National Railways (JNR), the successor of JGR, on 1 April 1987, JR Kyushu took over control of the station.

In July 2017, torrential rainfall led to the tracks of the Hitahikosan Line from Soeda to Yoake being covered with mud and debris. Train services along this sector were cancelled. The Hitahikosan Line was replaced by a BRT service in 2023.

== Passenger statistics ==
In fiscal 2015, there were a total of 13,265 boarding passengers, giving a daily average of 36 passengers.

== Surrounding area ==
- Hita City Yoake Elementary School

== See also ==
- List of railway stations in Japan
