= Jōno Station (JR Kyushu) =

Railway station in Kitakyushu, Japan

JF 04 JI 04 Jōno Station 城野駅
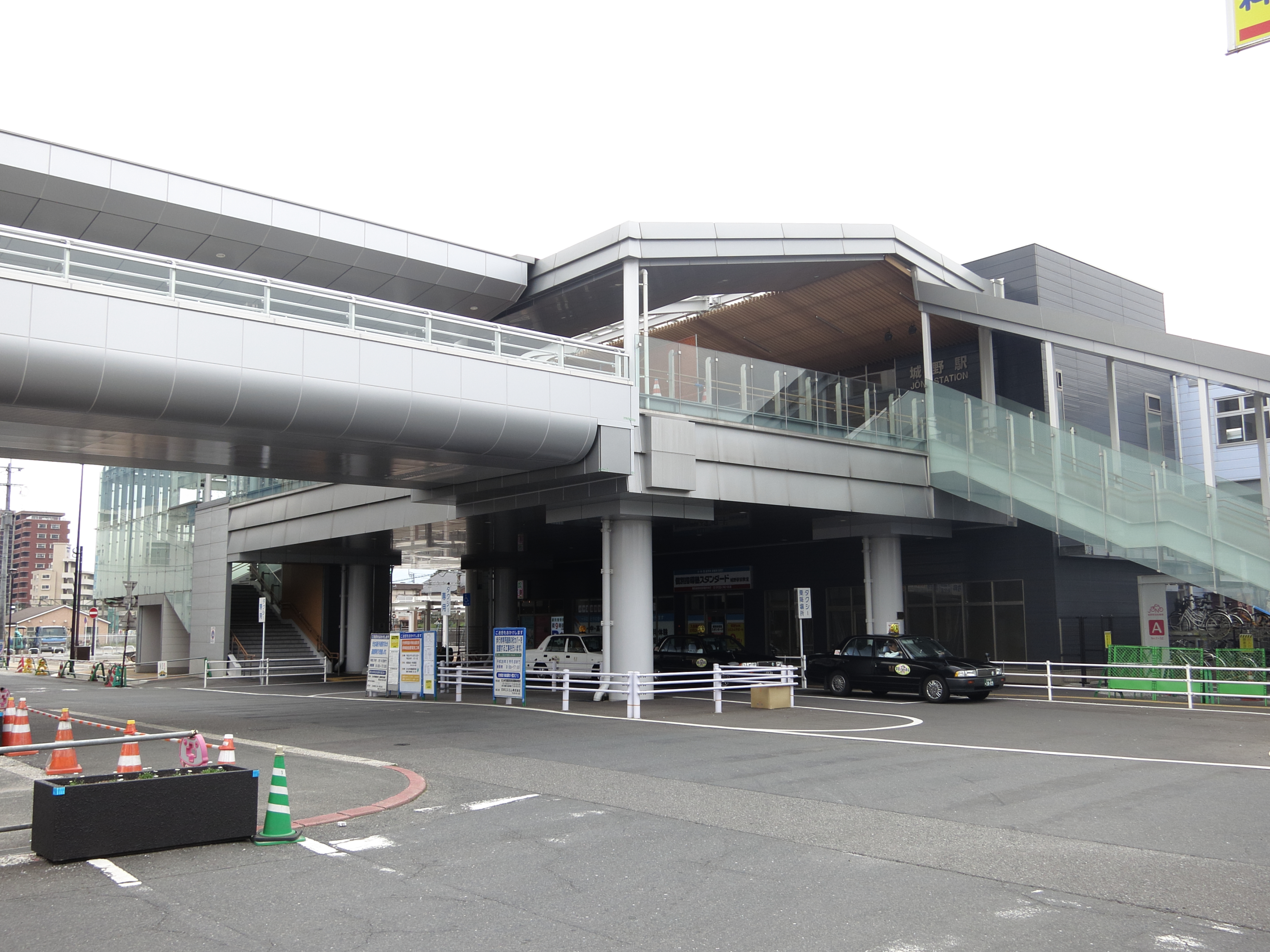
- Jōno Station in March 2016

General information
- Location: 1-6-1 Shirono, Kokuraminami-ku, Kitakyūshū-shi, Fukuoka-ken; Japan
- Coordinates: 33°51′29″N 130°53′11″E
- Operator: JR Kyushu
- Lines: JF Nippō Main Line; JI Hitahikosan Line
- Distance: 6.1 km from Kokura
- Platforms: 2 island + 1 side platform
- Tracks: 5

Construction
- Structure type: At grade

Other information
- Status: Staffed (Midori no Madoguchi)
- Station code: JF04; JI04
- Website: Official website

History
- Opened: 1 April 1895

Passengers
- FY2021: 4018 daily (boarding only)

Services
Preceding station	JR Kyushu	Following station
through to Hitahikosan Line	Nippō Main Line Local	Minami-Kokura JF 03 JI 03 towards Kokura
Abeyama-kōen JF 05 towards Kagoshima	Nippō Main Line Local	Minami-Kokura JF 03 JI 03 towards Kokura
Ishida JI 05 towards Yoake	Hitahikosan Line Local	Minami-Kokura JF 03 JI 03 towards Kokura
Ishiharamachi JI 08 towards Yoake	Hitahikosan Line Rapid	Terminus
Location
- Location within Fukuoka Prefecture Location within Kyushu Location within Japan

Jōno Station (城野駅, Jōno-eki) is a passenger railway station located in Kokuraminami-ku, Kitakyushu, Fukuoka Prefecture, Japan. It is operated by JR Kyushu.

== Lines ==
Jōno Station is served by the Nippō Main Line and is located 6.1 km from the starting point of the line at Kokura. It is also the northern terminus for the 39.4 kilometer Hitahikosan Line to Soeda, although most trains continue for another 2.6 kilometers to terminate at Kokura

== Layout ==
The station consists of one side platform and two island platforms, connected by an elevated station building. The station has a Midori no Madoguchi staffed ticket office.

=== Platforms ===
1	■ JF Nippō Main Line	for Yukuhashi and Nakatsu
2	■ JI Hitahikosan Line	for Tagawa-Gotōji and Soeda
3	■ JF Nippō Main Line	for Kokura
4	■ JF Nippō Main Line	for Kokura
5	■ JI Hitahikosan Line	for Kokura

== History ==
Jōno Station was established on 1 April 1895 as a station on the Kyushu Railway. The railway was nationalized in 1907. With the privatization of the JNR on 1 April 1987, the station came under the control of JR Kyushu.

== Passenger statistics ==
In fiscal 2021, there was a daily average of 4018 boarding passengers at this station.。

== Surrounding area ==
- Jōno Station (Kitakyushu Monorail), About 15 minutes walk (about 800 m) from this station.
- Fukuoka Prefectural Kokura Commercial High School
- Fukuoka Prefectural Kokura Minami High School

== See also ==
- List of railway stations in Japan
