= 1985 in rail transport =

This article lists events related to rail transport that occurred in 1985.

== Events ==
=== January events ===
- January 5 - At ceremonies held in Nenana and Seward, Alaska, ownership of the Alaska Railroad is officially transferred to the U.S. state of Alaska.
- January 9 –Kitakyushu Monorail, Heiwadori Station to Kikugaoka Station route officially completed in Fukuoka Prefecture, Japan.
- January 13 - Awash rail disaster killed 428 in Awash, Ethiopia.

=== February events ===
- February 21 - The Soo Line acquires the Milwaukee Road and attempts to operate it as a subsidiary railroad.

=== March events ===
- March - The Tōhoku Shinkansen line in Japan is extended from Omiya Station to Ueno Station, near Tokyo.
- March 2 – Porto Alegre Metro Line 1, Mercado to Sapucaia route, first section of operation service start in Brazil.
- March 11 – A first section of Recife Metro Line 1, Recife to Wermeck route, officially regular operation service to start in Brazil.
- March 14 – Shin-Misato Station, on what is now JR East's Musashino Line in Misato, Saitama, Japan, is opened.
- March 25 - A methane gas explosion in Los Angeles led to the abandonment of subway construction along the city's most important corridor, Wilshire Boulevard. The subway would not be seriously looked at again for almost 20 years until the D Line Extension.
- March 30 – Massachusetts Bay Transportation Authority expands rail service on the Red Line beyond Harvard Square to Alewife.

=== April events ===
- April 30 - Canadian National Railway and Canadian Pacific Railway assume joint operations of southern Ontario's Canada Southern Railway line.

=== May events ===
- May 12 - Manila Line 1, the first ever rapid transit line in Southeast Asia began full commercial operations by opening the remaining segment from Central Terminal Station up to Monumento Station.

=== June events ===
- June 11 - The HaBonim disaster was an accident in which a train crashed into a bus near HaBonim, Israel killing 22 people.
- June 27 - The Harbour Island People Mover commences service between Downtown Tampa and Harbour Island in Tampa, Florida, United States.

=== July events ===
- July 3 – Pittsburgh Light Rail downtown subway opens for operation.
- July 19 – Busan Metro Line 1, Beomeosa to Beomnaegol route officially completed, and first section operation service start of Busan Metro in South Korea.

=== September events ===
- September - China Railway opens the world's longest railway bridge at this date, carrying the Heze–Xinxiang line over the Yellow River [10.3 km (6.4 mi)].
- September 30 – Saikyo Line, Ikebukuro of Tokyo via Musashi-Urawa to Omiya route officially completed, as same time, Ikebukuro via Omiya to Kawagoe of Kawagoe Line route of direct commuter train service start in Japan.. Like a Tohoku Shinkansen line built separately, this corridor uses Automatic Train Control, previously used only at subways, high-speed rail, Yamanote Line and Keihin-Tohoku Line.

=== October events ===
- October 18
  - Opening of the first section of Line 3 on the Seoul Metropolitan Subway from Gupabal to Yangjae (26.2 km (16.3 mi)).
  - Opening of the first section of Line 4 on the Seoul Metropolitan Subway from Sanggye to Sadang (28.3 km (17.6 mi)).

=== Unknown date events ===
- The Chicago Central and Pacific Railroad is formed by a spinoff of former Illinois Central lines from Chicago, Illinois, westward.
- Amtrak's Gulf Coast Limited passenger train makes its final run.

== Deaths ==
=== March deaths ===
- March 23 - Richard Beeching, chairman of the British Railways Board 1961–1965 (b. 1913).
