= Ishida Station (Fukuoka) =

Railway station in Kitakyushu, Japan

JI 05 Ishida Station 石田駅
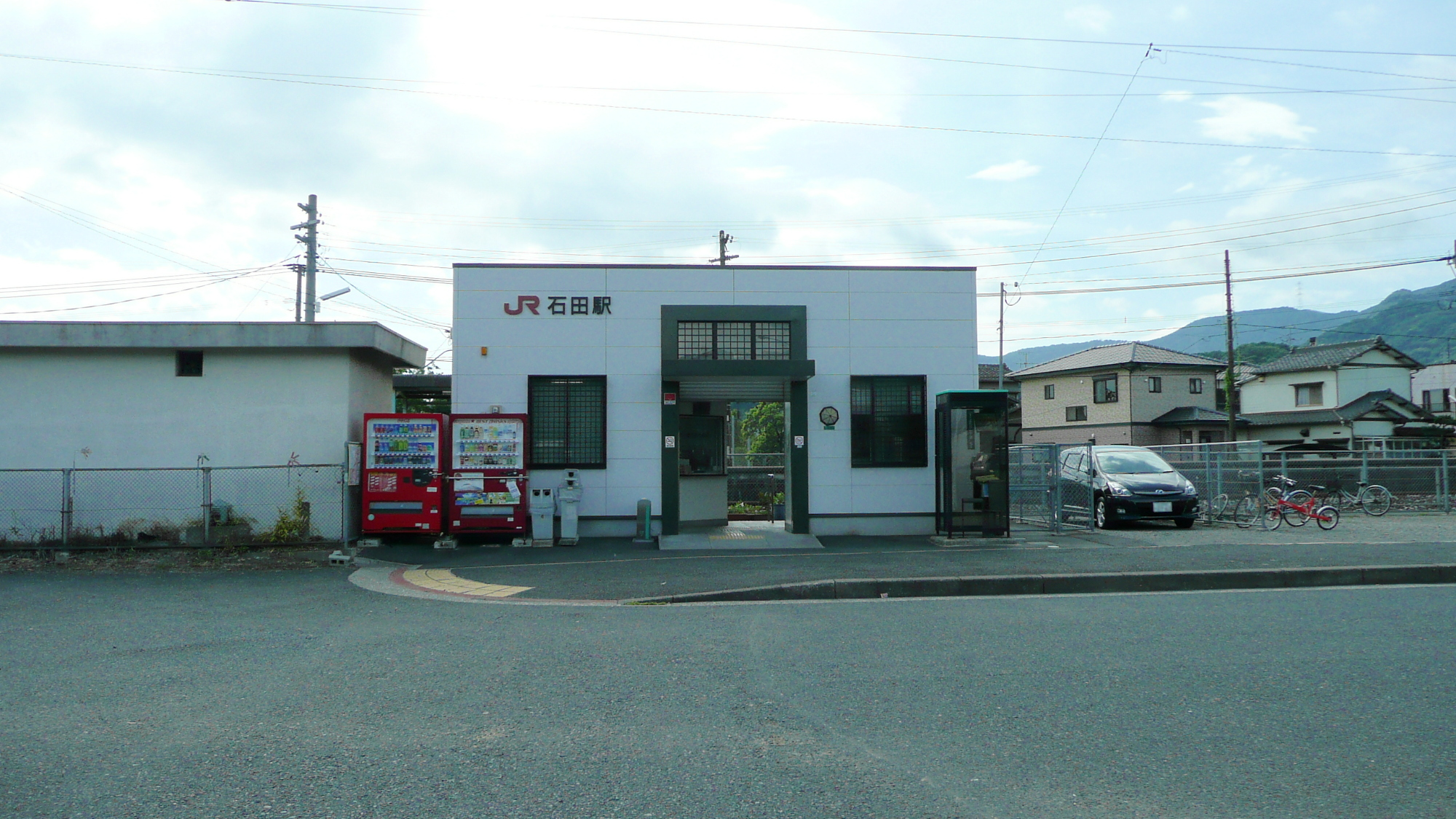
- Ishida Station building in August 2008

General information
- Location: 2-7 Shimoishida, Kokuraminami-ku, Kitakyushu-shi, Fukuoka-ken 802-0832; Japan
- Coordinates: 33°49′56″N 130°53′20″E
- Operator: JR Kyushu
- Line: JI Hitahikosan Line
- Distance: 3.3 km from Jōno
- Platforms: 1 island platform
- Tracks: 1

Other information
- Status: Unstaffed
- Station code: JI05
- Website: Official website

History
- Opened: 1 April 1915

Passengers
- FY2020: 338

Services
Preceding station	JR Kyushu	Following station
Shii-Kōen towards Yoake	Hitahikosan Line	Jōno towards Kokura
Location
- Location within Fukuoka Prefecture Location within Japan

Ishida Station (石田駅, Ishida-eki) is a passenger railway station located in Kokuraminami-ku, Kitakyūshū, Fukuoka Prefecture, Japan. It is operated by JR Kyushu.

== Lines ==
The station is served by the Hitahikosan Line and is located 3.3 km from the starting point of the line at Jōno. One train per hour stops at the station during the daytime, increased to two per hour during the morning and evening peaks.

== Layout ==
The station consists of one island platform connected to the station building by a level crossing. The station is unattended.

=== Platforms ===
1	■ JI Hitahikosan Line	for Jōno and Kokura
2	■ JI Hitahikosan Line	for Tagawa-Gotōji and Soeda

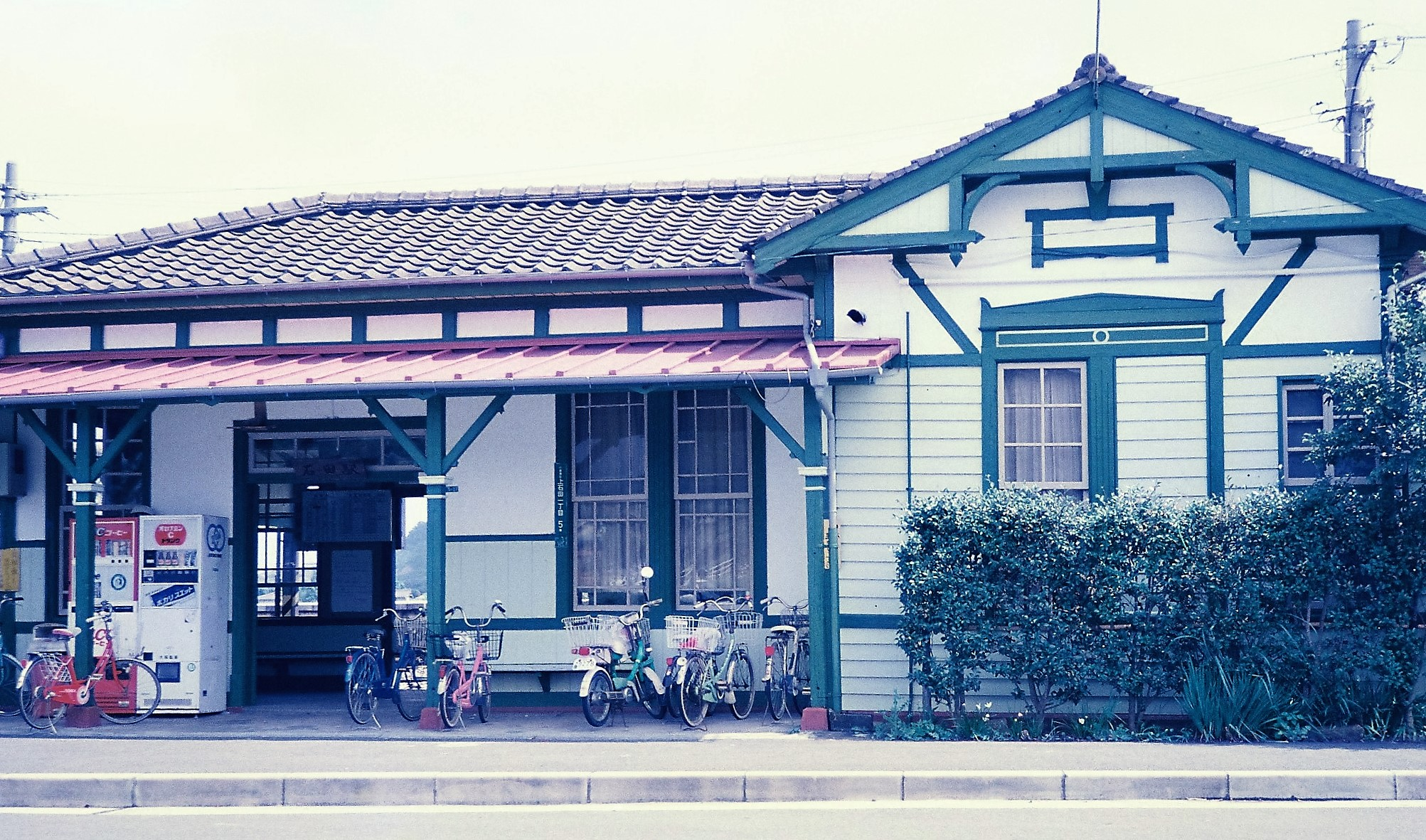
The station in August 1987 before rebuilding

== History ==
The station opened on 1 April 1915 as a station on the Kokura Railway. With the privatization of Japanese National Railways (JNR) on 1 April 1987, the station came under the control of JR Kyushu. The station became unstaffed from March 2016.

== Passenger statistics ==
In fiscal 2020, the station was used by an average of 338 passengers daily (boarding passengers only).

== Surrounding area ==
- Kitakyushu City Yokoyo Elementary School
- Kitakyushu City Yokoyo Junior High School

== See also ==
- List of railway stations in Japan
