= Shii Station (Kitakyushu Monorail) =

Railway station in Kokura Minami ward, Kitakyushu City, Fukuoka Prefecture, Japan

Coordinates: 33°49′21″N 130°52′17″E

Shii Station 志井駅
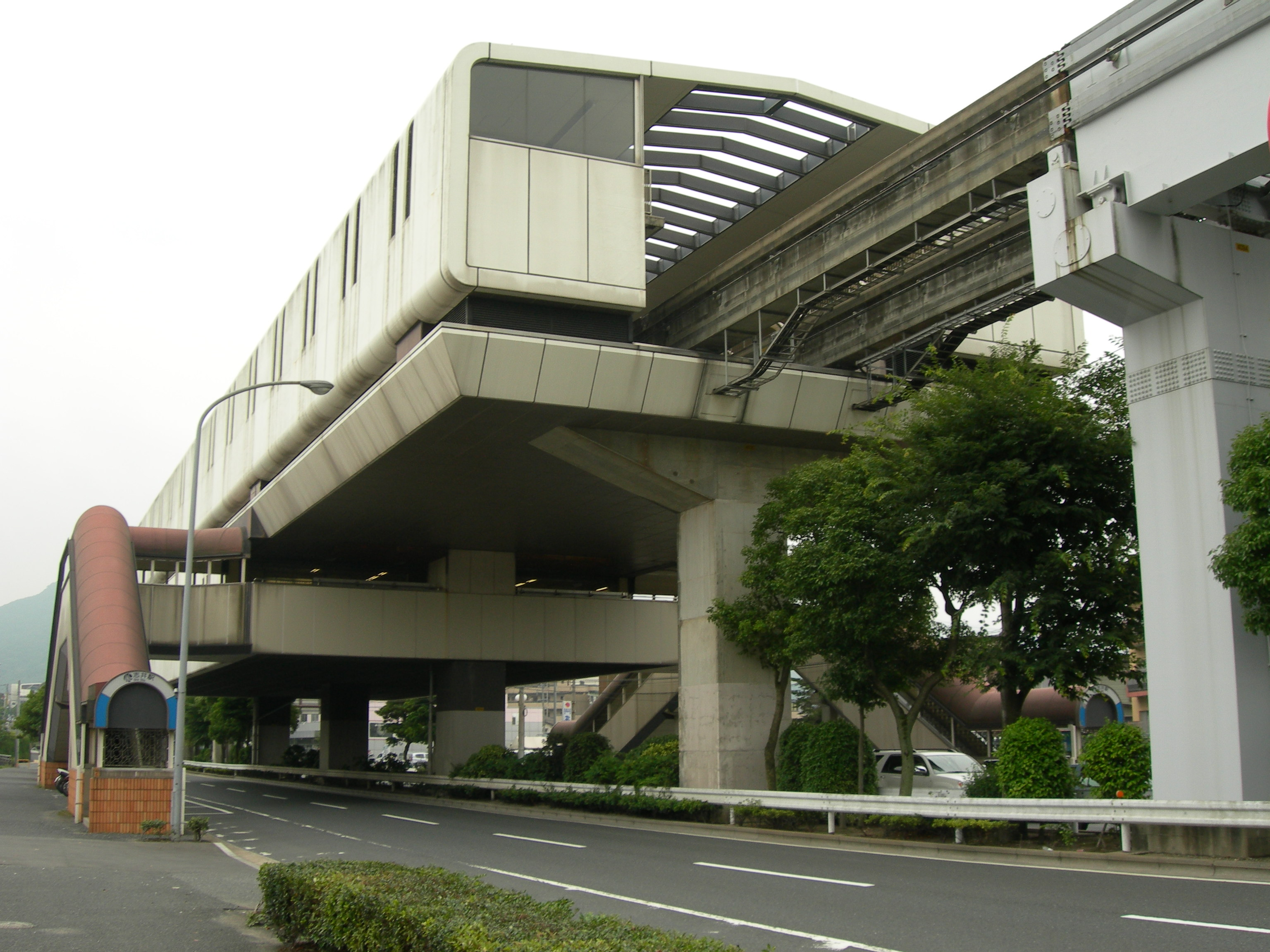
- Station building

General information
- Location: Kokuraminami-ku, Kitakyushu, Fukuoka Prefecture, Japan
- Operator: Kitakyushu Urban Monorail Co. Ltd.
- Line: Kitakyushu Monorail
- Platforms: 2 side platforms
- Tracks: 2

Construction
- Structure type: Elevated

Other information
- Station code: 12

History
- Opened: 9 January 1985; 41 years ago

Services
Preceding station	Kitakyushu Monorail	Following station
Tokuriki Arashiyamaguchi towards Kokura	Kokura Line	Kikugaoka Terminus
Location

Shii Station (志井駅, Shii-eki) is a Kitakyūshū Monorail station in Kokuraminami-ku, Kitakyūshū, Japan.

== History ==
The station opened on 9 January 1985, coinciding with the opening of the Kitakyushu Monorail.

== Station layout ==
The elevated station has two side platforms with two tracks.

=== Platforms ===
1	■ Kitakyushu Monorail	Kikugaoka
2	■ Kitakyushu Monorail	Kokura
