= Katano Station =

Railway station in Kokura Kita ward, Kitakyushu City, Fukuoka Prefecture, Japan

Coordinates: 33.8657°N 130.8799°E

Katano Station 片野駅
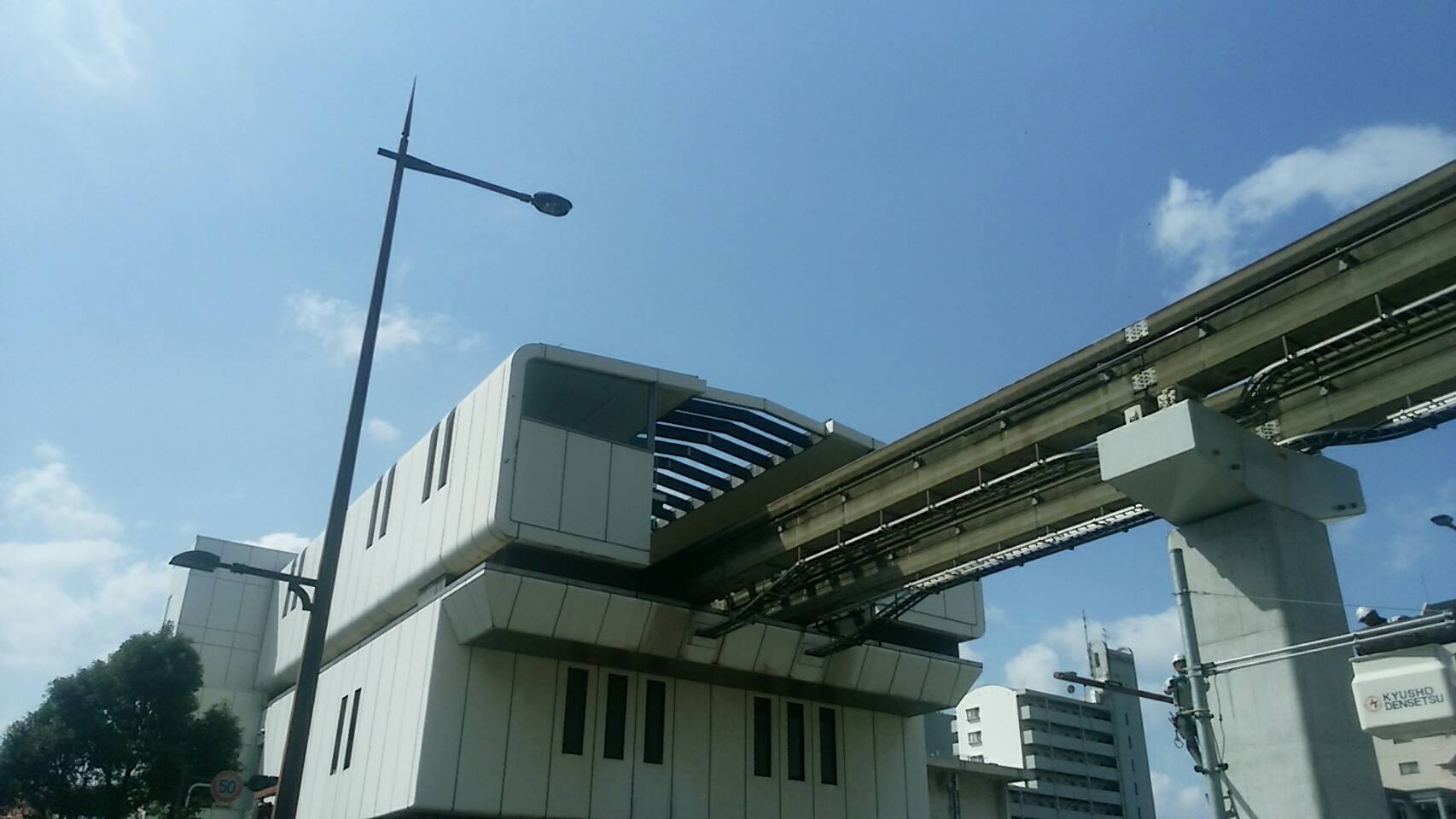
- Station building

General information
- Location: Kokurakita-ku, Kitakyushu, Fukuoka Prefecture, Japan
- Operator: Kitakyushu Urban Monorail Co. Ltd.
- Line: Kitakyushu Monorail
- Platforms: 2 side platforms
- Tracks: 2

Construction
- Structure type: Elevated

Other information
- Station code: 05

History
- Opened: 9 January 1985; 41 years ago

Services
Preceding station	Kitakyushu Monorail	Following station
Kawaraguchi Mihagino towards Kokura	Kokura Line	Jōno towards Kikugaoka
Location

Katano Station (片野駅, Katano-eki) is a Kitakyushu monorail station in Kokura Kita ward, Kitakyushu, Japan.

== History ==
The station opened on 9 January 1985, coinciding with the opening of the Kitakyushu Monorail.

== Station layout ==
The elevated station has two side platforms with two tracks.

=== Platforms ===
1	■ Kitakyushu Monorail	Kikugaoka
2	■ Kitakyushu Monorail	Kokura
