= Jōno Station =

Jōno Station is the name of two train stations in Japan:

- Jōno Station (JR Kyushu)
- Jōno Station (Kitakyushu Monorail)
