= Shii-Kōen Station =

Railway station in Kitakyushu, Japan

JI 06 Shii-Kōen Station 志井公園駅
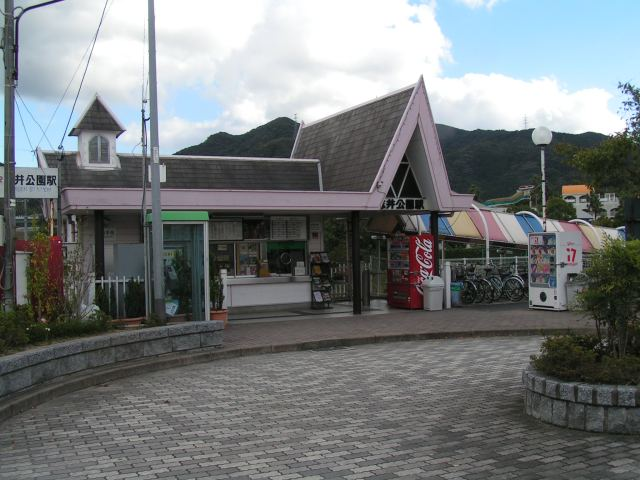
- Shii-Kōen Station in November 2005

General information
- Location: 6-chōme-28 Shii, Kokuraminami-ku, Kitakyushu-shi, Fukuoka-ken 802-0985; Japan
- Coordinates: 33°49′07″N 130°52′47″E
- Operator: JR Kyushu
- Line: JI Hitahikosan Line
- Distance: 5.1 km from Jōno
- Platforms: 1 side platform
- Tracks: 1

Other information
- Status: Unstaffed
- Station code: JI06
- Website: Official website

History
- Opened: 1 April 1915

Passengers
- FY2020: 665

Services
Preceding station	JR Kyushu	Following station
Shii towards Yoake	Hitahikosan Line	Ishida towards Kokura
Location
- Location within Fukuoka Prefecture Location within Japan

Shii-Kōen Station (志井公園駅, Shii-Kōen-eki) is a passenger railway station located in Kokuraminami-ku, Kitakyūshū, Fukuoka Prefecture, Japan. It is operated by JR Kyushu.

== Lines ==
The station is served by the Hitahikosan Line and is located 5.1 km from the starting point of the line at Jōno. One train per hour stops at the station during the daytime, increased to two per hour during the morning and evening peaks.

== Layout ==
The station consists of one side platform serving a single track located in a cutting and connected to the station building by stairs and a slope. The station is unattended.

== History ==
The station opened on 11 March 1989.

== Passenger statistics ==
In fiscal 2020, the station was used by an average of 665 passengers daily (boarding passengers only).

== Surrounding area ==
- Kitakyushu Monorail Head office/vehicle depot
- National Institute of Technology, Kitakyushu College of Technology

== See also ==
- List of railway stations in Japan
