= University of Kitakyushu =

University in Fukuoka Prefecture, Japan

Coordinates: 33.84325°N 130.878194°E

- 北九州市立大学
- Type: Public
- Established: 1946
- Location: Kitakyushu, Fukuoka Prefecture, Japan
- Colors: blue
- Website: www.kitakyu-u.ac.jp

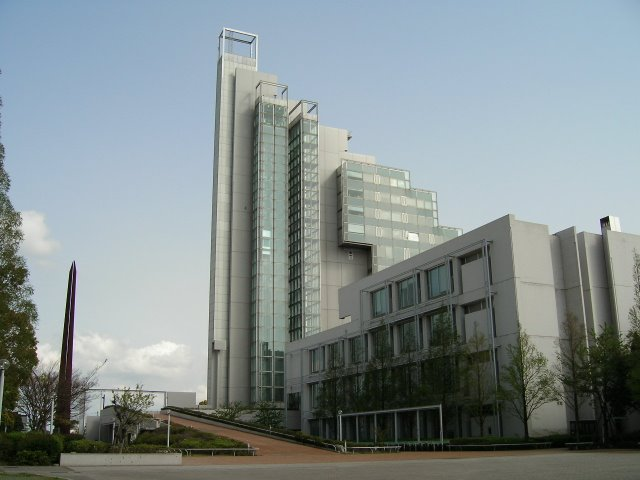
The University of Kitakyushu

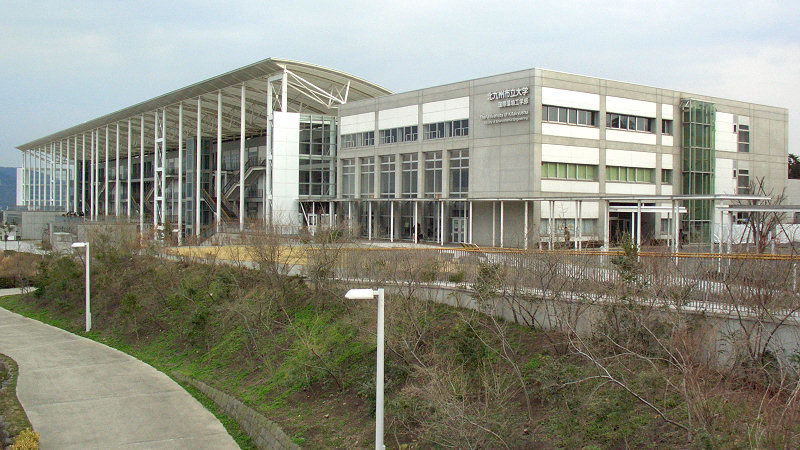
Wakamatsu Campus

The University of Kitakyushu (北九州市立大学, Kitakyūshū shiritsu daigaku; Kitakyushu City University) is a public university in Kitakyushu, Japan. The main campus is located next to Keibajomae (lit. Horse Racing course) station on the Kitakyushu monorail. The second campus is in the academic zone of Wakamatsu-ku, Kitakyushu called Gakujutsu Kenkyu Toshi (Gakken Tosi). The university was founded as a language academy in 1946 to help communication with the nearby American base at what is now called Yamada Ryokuchi.

The University of Kitakyushu has four faculties: the Faculty of Environmental Engineering, the Faculty of Information Engineering, the Faculty of Economics, and the Faculty of Humanities. These faculties offer undergraduate programs leading to bachelor's degrees, as well as graduate programs leading to master's and doctoral degrees.

== Notable alumni ==
- Junji Higashi, a member of the House of Representatives in the Diet
- Yuzuki Nakashima, a member of Japanese idol group Sakurazaka46

== Partner Institutions ==
=== Malaysia ===
- Universiti Tunku Abdul Rahman

=== Thailand ===
- King Mongkut's University of Technology Thonburi

=== United Kingdom ===
- Oxford Brookes University
