= Shota Koseki =

Japanese baseball player (born 1991)

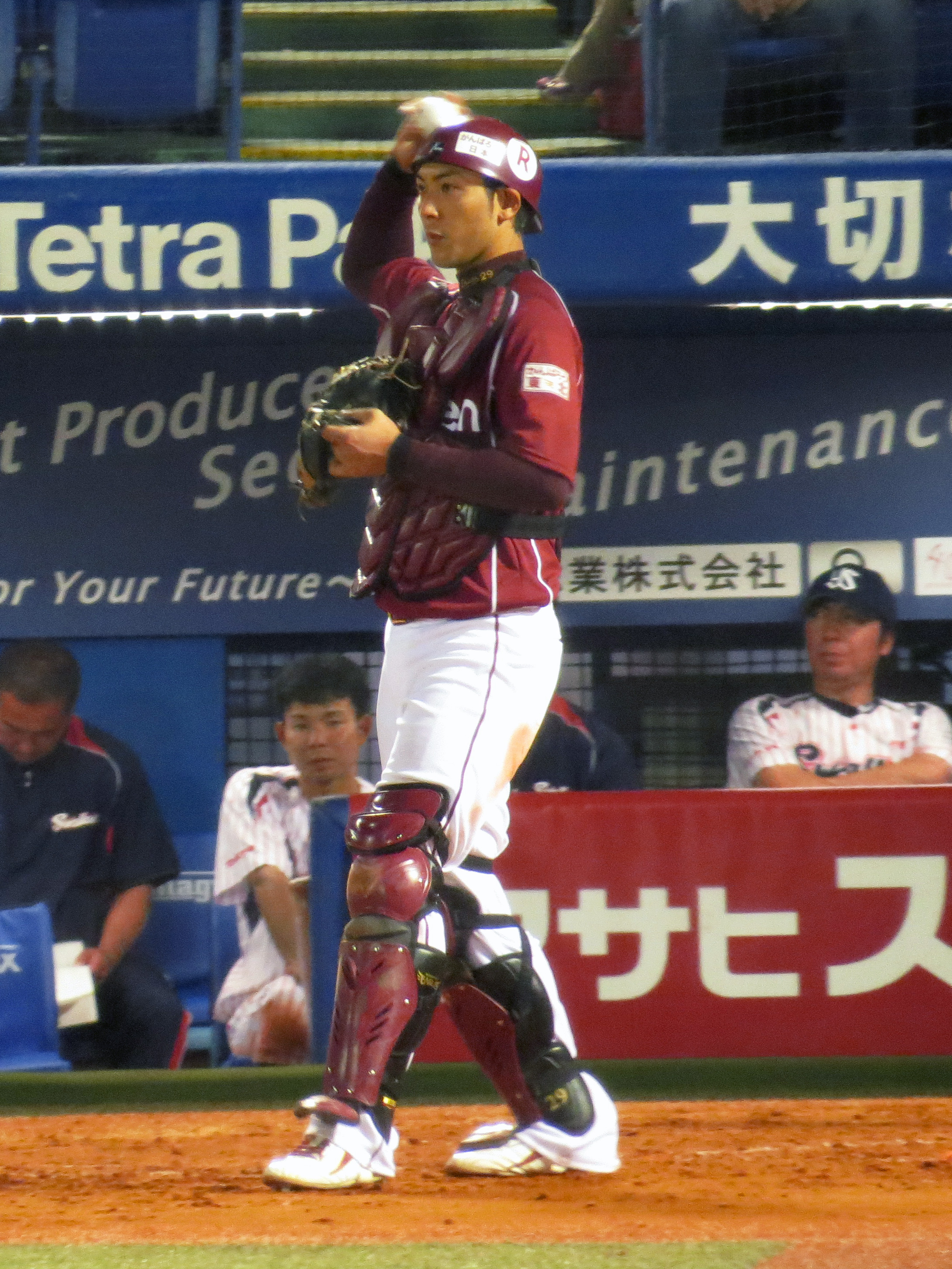
- Koseki with the Tohoku Rakuten Golden Eagles
- Catcher
- Born: September 6, 1991 (age 34); Kokuraminami-ku, Kitakyūshū, Japan
- Bats: Right Throws: Right

NPB debut
- 2014, for the Tohoku Rakuten Golden Eagles

NPB statistics (through 2016)
- Batting average: .149
- Home runs: 1
- RBI: 10
- Stats at Baseball Reference

Teams
- Tohoku Rakuten Golden Eagles (2014–2016)

Career highlights and awards
- Japan Series champion (2013)

Shota Koseki (小関 翔太, Koseki Shōta; born September 6, 1991) is a Japanese former professional baseball catcher. He played for the Tohoku Rakuten Golden Eagles in Japan's Nippon Professional Baseball from 2014 to 2016.
