= Kitagata Station =

Kitagata Station may refer to:

- Kitagata Station (Fukuoka), a Kitakyushu monorail station in Kokura Minami ward, Kitakyushu, Japan
- Kitagata Station (Saga), a train station in Kitagata Town, Takeo City, Saga Prefecture, Japan
