= Junji Higashi =

Japanese politician (1946–2023)

- 東 順治

Member of the House of Representatives
- In office 31 March 1998 – 16 November 2012
- Preceded by: Kōichirō Aino
- Succeeded by: Masakazu Hamachi
- Constituency: Kyushu PR
- In office 18 February 1990 – 27 September 1996
- Preceded by: Toshio Ōhashi
- Succeeded by: Constituency abolished
- Constituency: Fukuoka 2nd

Personal details
- Born: 6 October 1946 Kitakyushu, Fukuoka, Japan
- Died: 17 October 2023 (aged 77) Koga, Fukuoka, Japan
- Party: Komeito
- Other political affiliations: CGP (1990–1996); NFP (1996–1998)
- Education: University of Kitakyushu

Junji Higashi (東 順治, Higashi Junji; 6 October 1946 – 17 October 2023) was a Japanese politician of the New Komeito Party, a member of the House of Representatives in the Diet (national legislature). A native of Kitakyūshū, Fukuoka and graduate of the University of Kitakyushu he was elected to the House of Representatives for the first time in 1990. He represented the 2nd District of Fukuoka prefecture.

Junji Higashi died of pneumonia on 17 October 2023, at the age of 77.

== Sources ==
- 政治家情報 〜東 順治〜 (in Japanese). JANJAN. Archived from the original on 3 December 2007.
