= Masakazu Hamachi =

Japanese politician

- 濵地 雅一
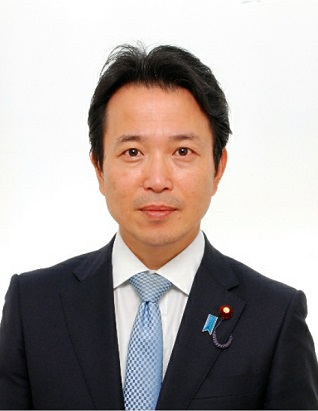
- Official portrait, 2015

Member of the House of Representatives
- Incumbent
- Assumed office 21 December 2012
- Preceded by: Junji Higashi
- Constituency: Kyushu PR

Personal details
- Born: 8 May 1970 (age 56) Fukuoka, Japan
- Party: Komeito
- Other political affiliations: CRA (2026)
- Education: Waseda University

Masakazu Hamachi (Japanese: 濵地 雅一, Hepburn: Hamachi Masakazu; born 8 May 1970) is a member of Komeito serving in the Japanese House of Representatives, a position that he has been elected four times. As of November 2023, he is also serving as State Minister of Health, Labour and Welfare. He is an alumnus of Waseda University.
