= Heiwadōri Station =

Railway station in Kokura Kita ward, Kitakyushu City, Fukuoka Prefecture, Japan

Coordinates: 33.8831°N 130.8815°E

Heiwadōri Station 平和通駅
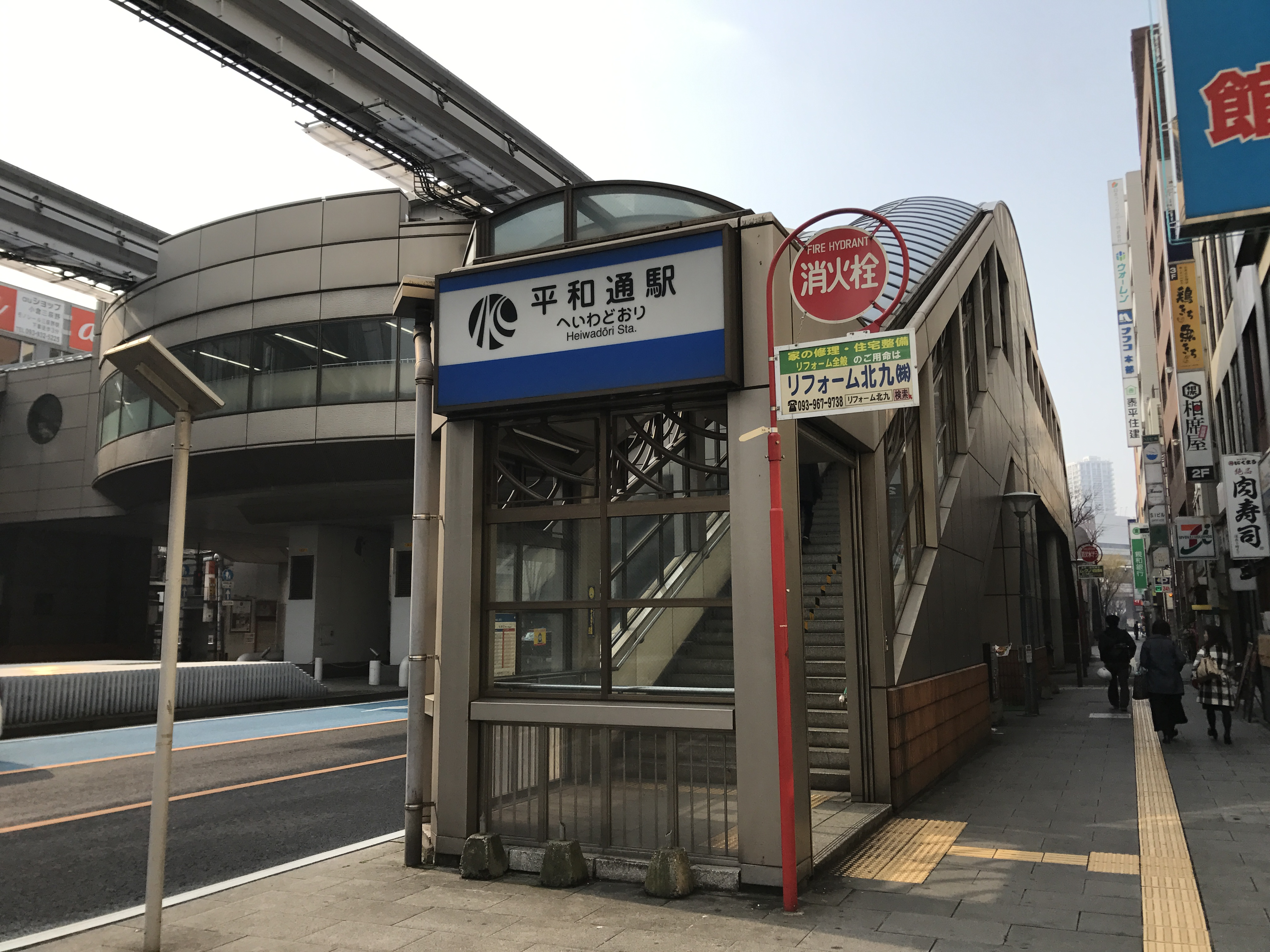
- Entrance No.6

General information
- Location: Kokurakita-ku, Kitakyushu, Fukuoka Prefecture, Japan
- Operator: Kitakyushu Urban Monorail Co. Ltd.
- Line: Kitakyushu Monorail
- Platforms: 2 (1 island platform)
- Tracks: 2

Construction
- Structure type: Elevated

Other information
- Station code: 02

History
- Opened: 9 January 1985; 41 years ago

Services
| Preceding station | Kitakyushu Monorail | Following station |
|---|---|---|
| Kokura Terminus | Kokura Line | Tanga towards Kikugaoka |
Location

Heiwadōri Station (平和通駅, Heiwadōri-eki) is a Kitakyushu monorail station in Kokura Kita-ku, Kitakyūshū, Fukuoka Prefecture, Japan.

== History ==
The station opened on 9 January 1985 as Kokura Station and was renamed to the current name on 1 April 1998 when the monorail was extended 400 metres and connected to Kokura Station.

== Station layout ==
The elevated station has an island platform with two tracks.

=== Platforms ===
| 1 | ■ Kitakyushu Monorail | Kikugaoka |
| 2 | ■ Kitakyushu Monorail | Kokura |

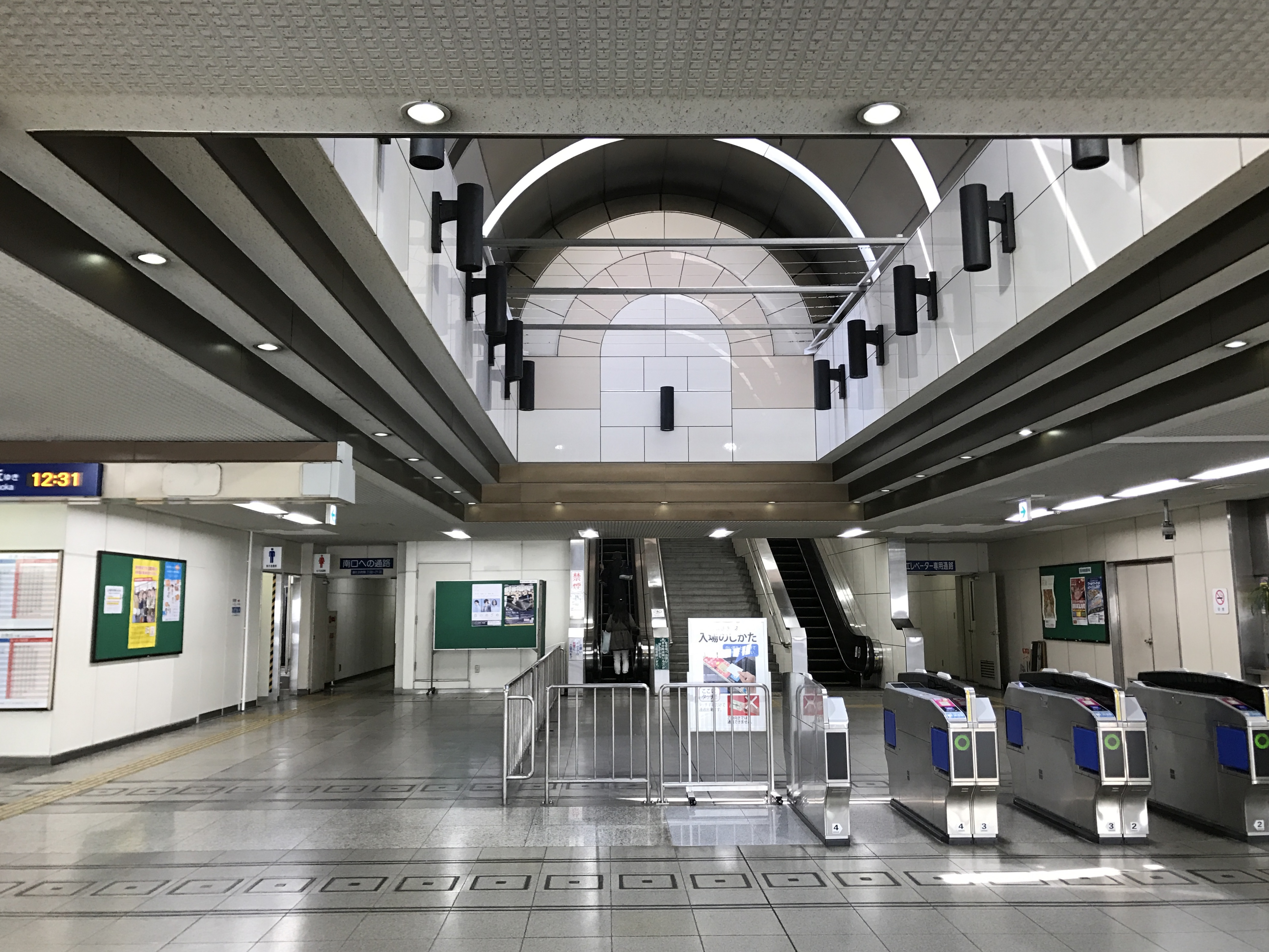
Ticket gates

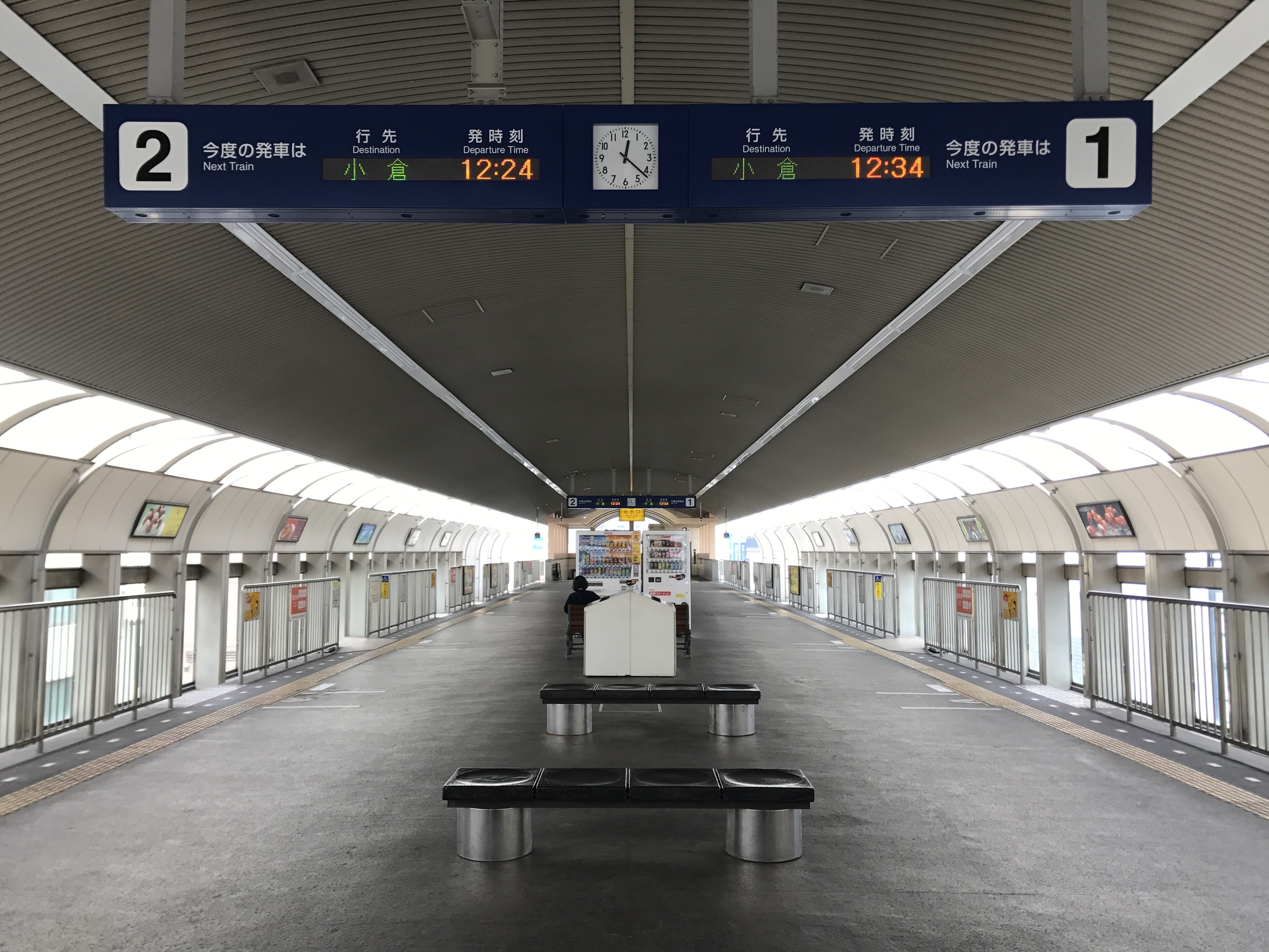
Platform
