= Kitakyushu Monorail =

Monorail service in Kitakyushu, Japan

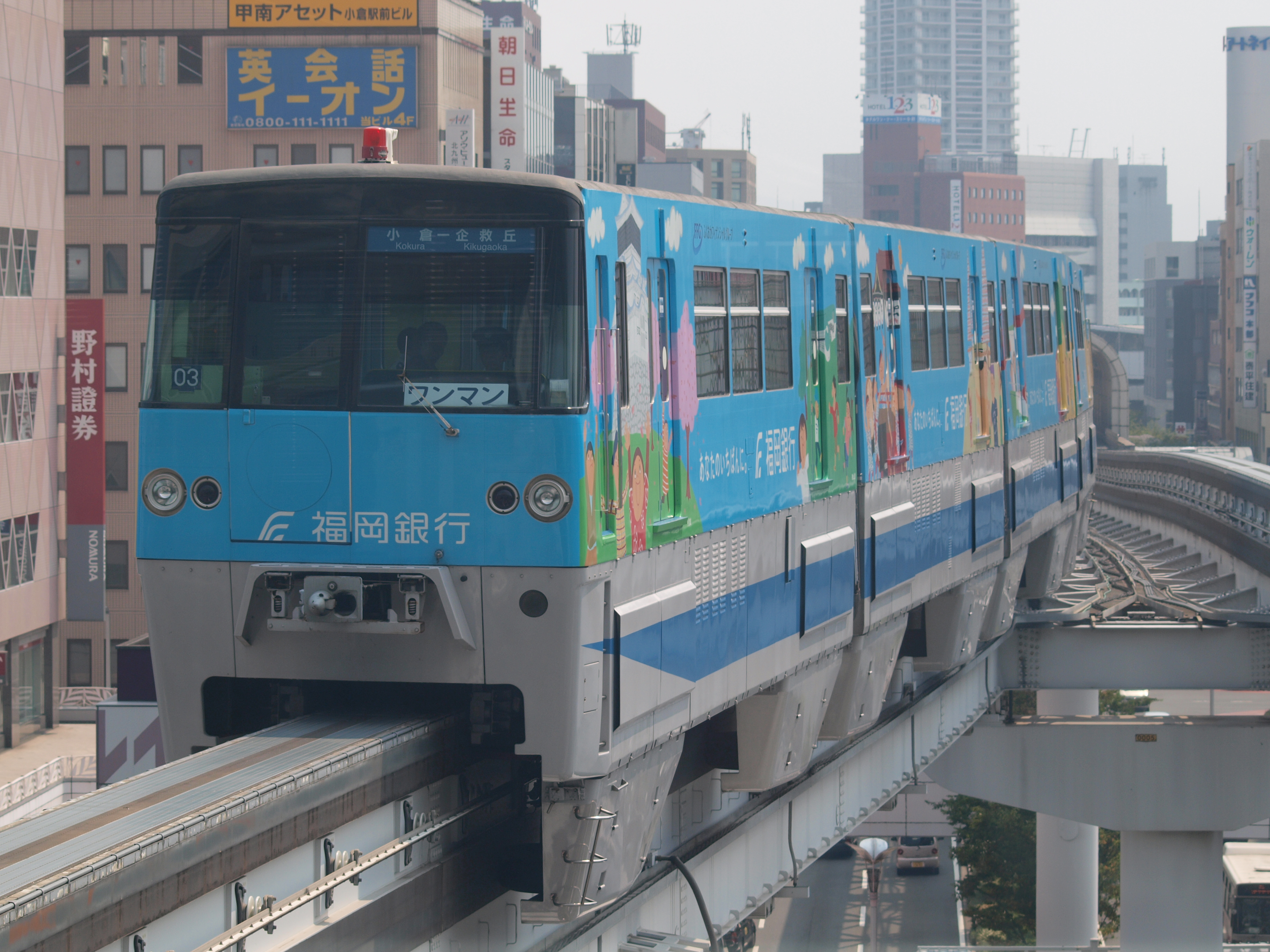

Overview
- Owner: Kitakyushu Urban Monorail Co., Ltd. (owned by the city of Kitakyushu)
- Locale: Kitakyushu, Japan
- Stations: 13

Service
- Type: Straddle-beam monorail (Alweg‑type)
- Daily ridership: 32,820 (JFY23)

History
- Opened: 9 January 1985; 41 years ago

Technical
- Line length: 8.8 km (5.5 mi)
- Electrification: Contact rails, 1,500 V DC
Route map
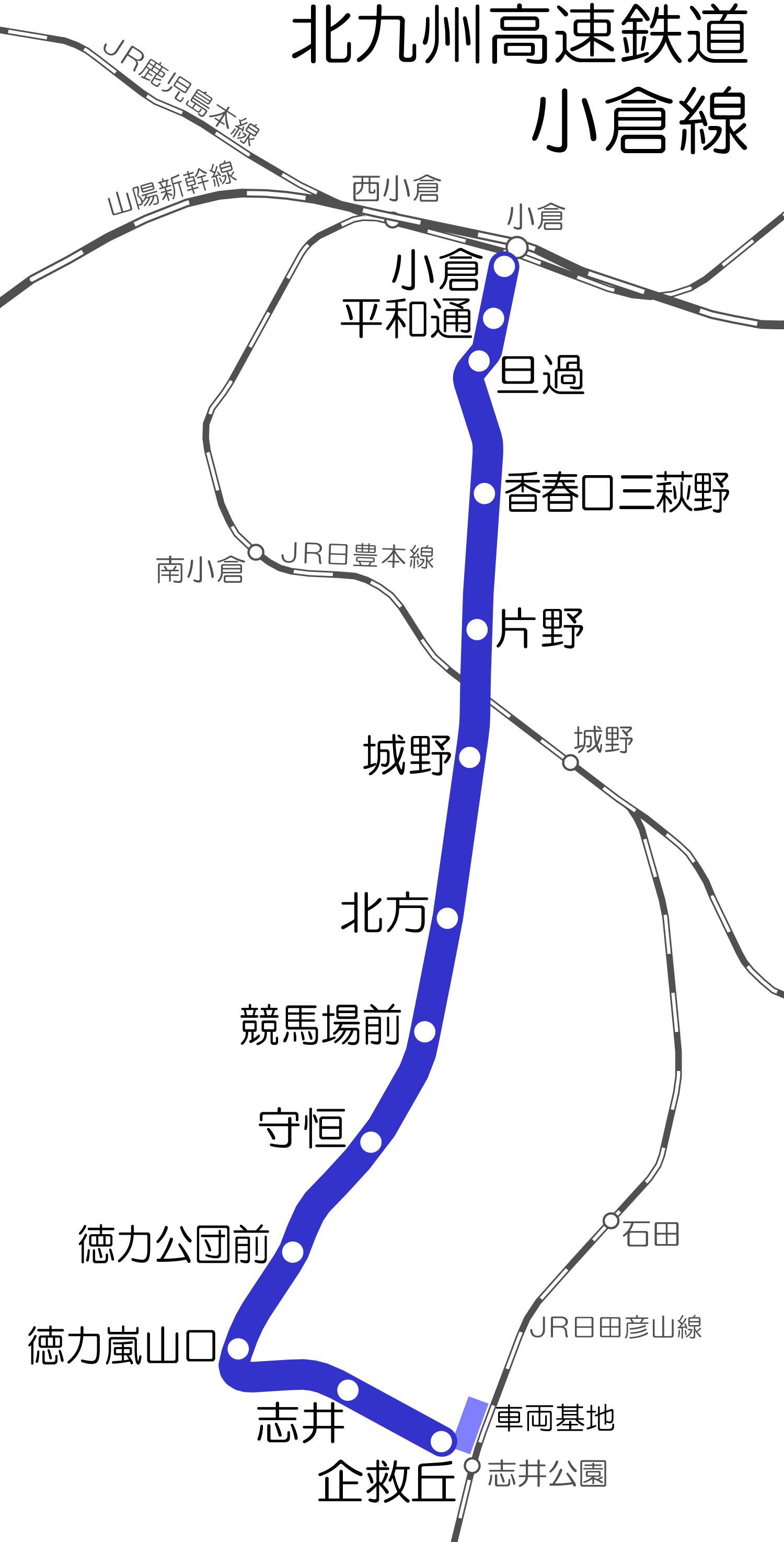

The Kitakyushu Monorail (Note: Japanese: 北九州モノレール, Hepburn: Kitakyūshū monorēru) is a monorail system in the city of Kitakyushu in Fukuoka Prefecture, Japan, operated by Kitakyushu Urban Monorail Co. Ltd., (Note: 北九州高速鉄道株式会社, Kitakyūshū Kōsoku Tetsudō Kabushiki-gaisha; lit. 'Kitakyūshū Rapid Railway Stock Company') which is wholly owned by the Kitakyushu municipal government.

The Kokura Line (Note: 小倉線, Kokura-sen) is the only line. It runs the 8.8 km (5.5 mi) between Kokura station and Kikugaoka station in Kokura Minami ward in about 18 minutes. It was opened on January 9, 1985, between the station now called Heiwadori and Kikugaoka, and at the time was the first monorail in the world with high level platforms and trains with floors entirely above the bogies. This increased available floor space and now all but one of Japan's surviving Alweg monorails have high level platforms and employ podium-free trains. This line was extended about 300 metres (1000 ft) to Kokura station from Heiwadori on April 1, 1998.

The monorail is owned by the city of Kitakyushu, and did not begin to make a profit until the extension to Kokura station was completed. This had been resisted by the businesses in Uomachi shopping district who feared they would lose customers, but that did not happen.

Once a year, there are beer and wine parties held on the monorail, with bookings made in advance. Santa Claus boards the train on December 24.

== Stations ==
No.	Station Name	Distance		Transfers	Location	
No.	Station Name	Between stations	Total	Transfers	Location	
01	Kokura	—N/a	0.0	San'yō Shinkansen; JA Kagoshima Main Line (JA21/JA51); JF Nippō Main Line (JF01); JI Hitahikosan Line (JI01)	Kokurakita-ku; Kitakyūshū	Fukuoka Prefecture
02	Heiwadōri	0.4 km (0.25 mi)	0.4 km (0.25 mi)		Kokurakita-ku; Kitakyūshū	Fukuoka Prefecture
03	Tanga	0.3 km (0.19 mi)	0.7 km (0.43 mi)		Kokurakita-ku; Kitakyūshū	Fukuoka Prefecture
04	Kawaraguchi Mihagino	0.9 km (0.56 mi)	1.6 km (0.99 mi)		Kokurakita-ku; Kitakyūshū	Fukuoka Prefecture
05	Katano	0.8 km (0.50 mi)	2.4 km (1.5 mi)		Kokurakita-ku; Kitakyūshū	Fukuoka Prefecture
06	Jōno	0.8 km (0.50 mi)	3.2 km (2.0 mi)		Kokuraminami-ku; Kitakyūshū	Fukuoka Prefecture
07	Kitagata	1.0 km (0.62 mi)	4.2 km (2.6 mi)		Kokuraminami-ku; Kitakyūshū	Fukuoka Prefecture
08	Keibajōmae	0.7 km (0.43 mi)	4.9 km (3.0 mi)		Kokuraminami-ku; Kitakyūshū	Fukuoka Prefecture
09	Moritsune	0.8 km (0.50 mi)	5.7 km (3.5 mi)		Kokuraminami-ku; Kitakyūshū	Fukuoka Prefecture
10	Tokuriki Kōdanmae	0.9 km (0.56 mi)	6.6 km (4.1 mi)		Kokuraminami-ku; Kitakyūshū	Fukuoka Prefecture
11	Tokuriki Arashiyamaguchi	0.7 km (0.43 mi)	7.3 km (4.5 mi)		Kokuraminami-ku; Kitakyūshū	Fukuoka Prefecture
12	Shii	0.9 km (0.56 mi)	8.2 km (5.1 mi)		Kokuraminami-ku; Kitakyūshū	Fukuoka Prefecture
13	Kikugaoka	0.6 km (0.37 mi)	8.8 km (5.5 mi)	JI Hitahikosan Line (Shii-Kōen: JI06)	Kokuraminami-ku; Kitakyūshū	Fukuoka Prefecture

== See also ==
- Monorails in Japan
- Kitakyushu Airport
- List of rapid transit systems
