= Kikugaoka Station =

Railway station in Kokura Minami ward, Kitakyushu City, Fukuoka Prefecture, Japan

Coordinates: 33°49′11″N 130°52′40″E

Kikugaoka Station 企救丘駅
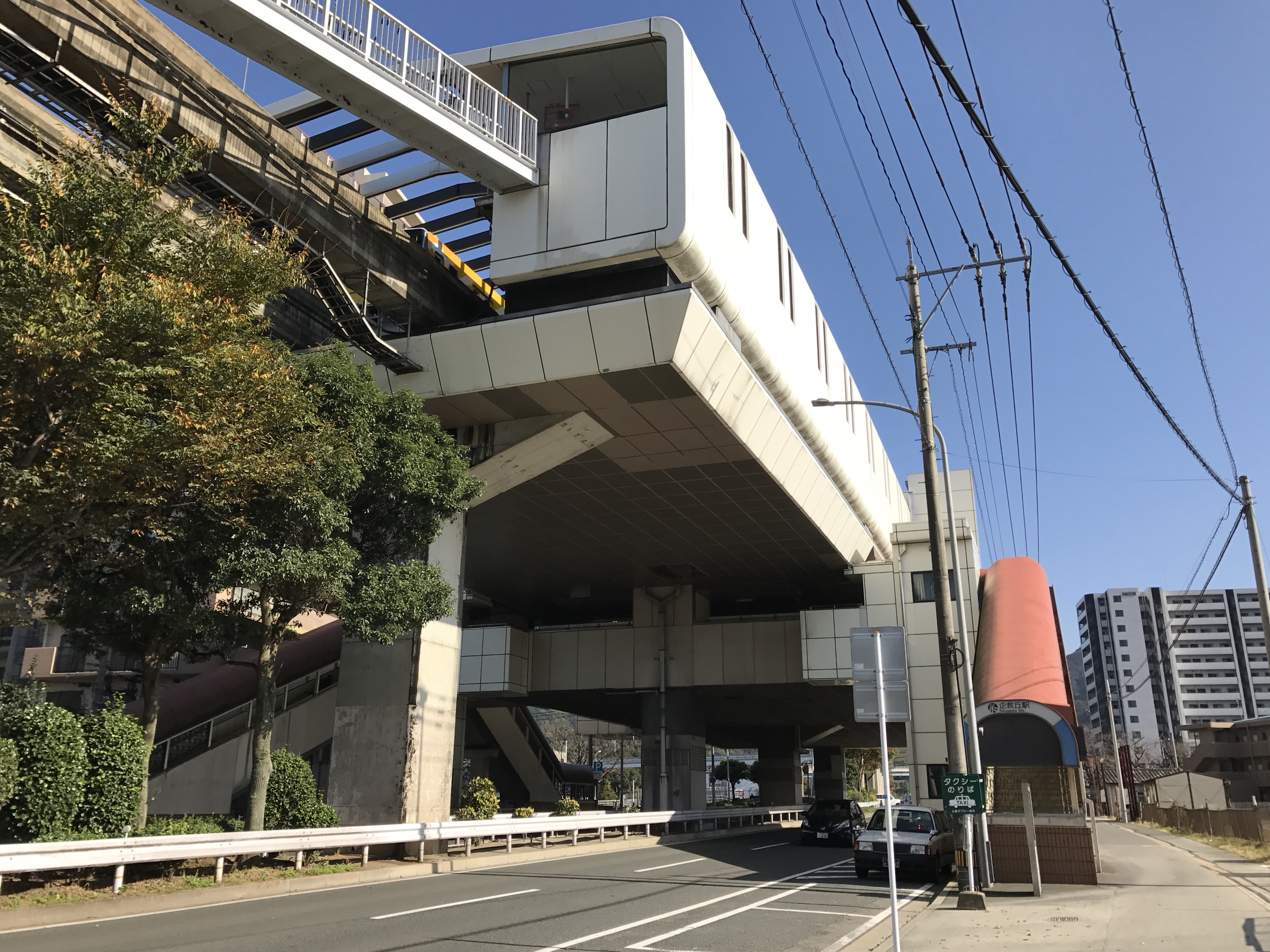
- Station building

General information
- Location: Kokuraminami-ku, Kitakyushu, Fukuoka Prefecture, Japan
- Operator: Kitakyushu Urban Monorail Co. Ltd.
- Line: Kitakyushu Monorail
- Platforms: 2 side platforms
- Tracks: 2
- Connections: Hitahikosan Line (Shii-Kōen)

Construction
- Structure type: Elevated

Other information
- Station code: 13

History
- Opened: 9 January 1985; 41 years ago

Services
| Preceding station | Kitakyushu Monorail | Following station |
|---|---|---|
| Shii towards Kokura | Kokura Line | Terminus |
Location

Kikugaoka Station (企救丘駅, Kikugaoka-eki) is a Kitakyūshū Monorail station in Kokuraminami-ku, Kitakyūshū, Japan. Shii-Kōen Station on the JR Kyushu Hitahikosan Line is nearby.

== History ==
The station opened on 9 January 1985, coinciding with the opening of the Kitakyushu Monorail.

== Station layout ==
The elevated station has two side platforms with two tracks.

=== Platforms ===
| 1 | ■ Kitakyushu Monorail | Terminus |
| 2 | ■ Kitakyushu Monorail | Kokura |

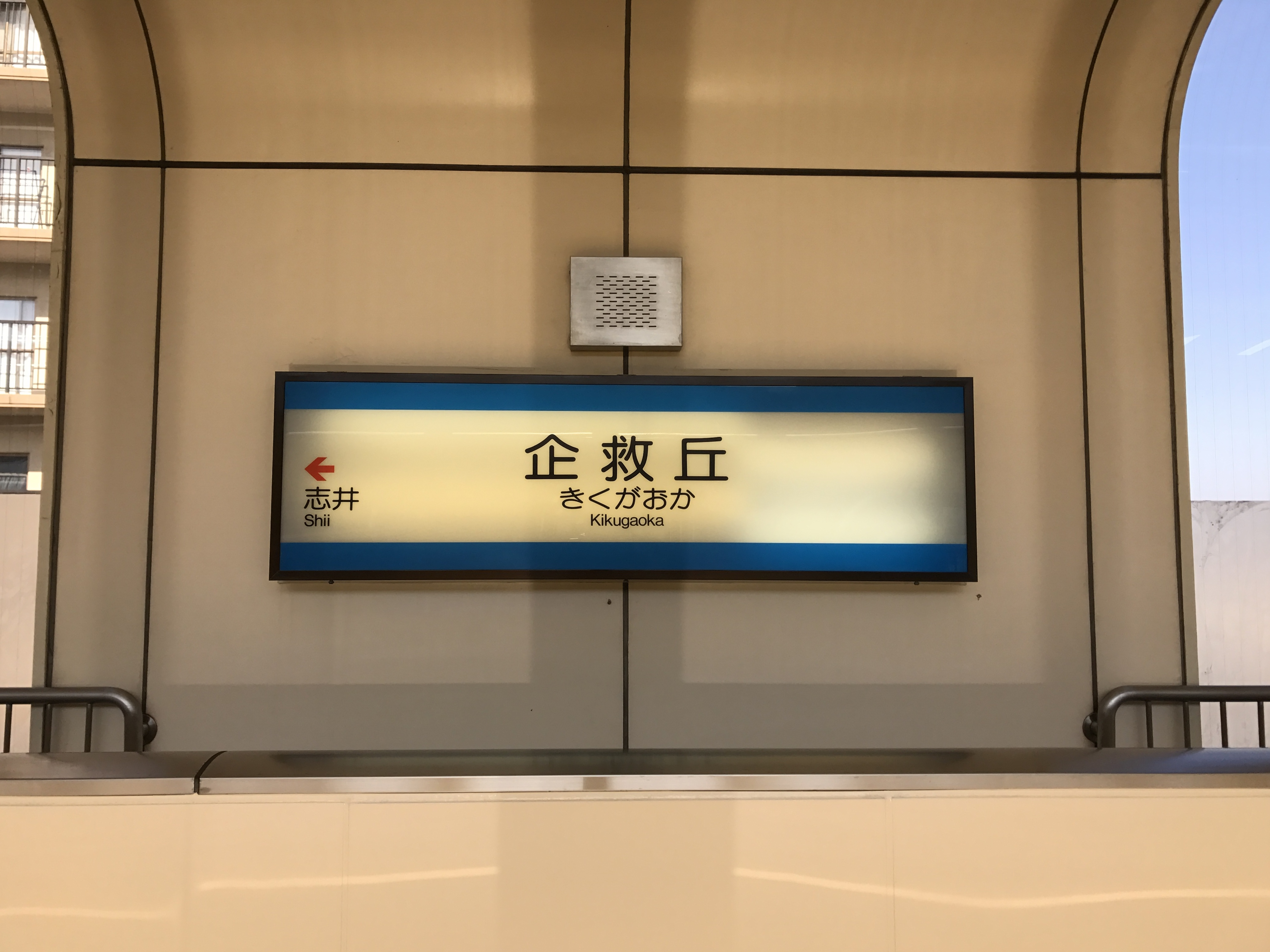
Station sign

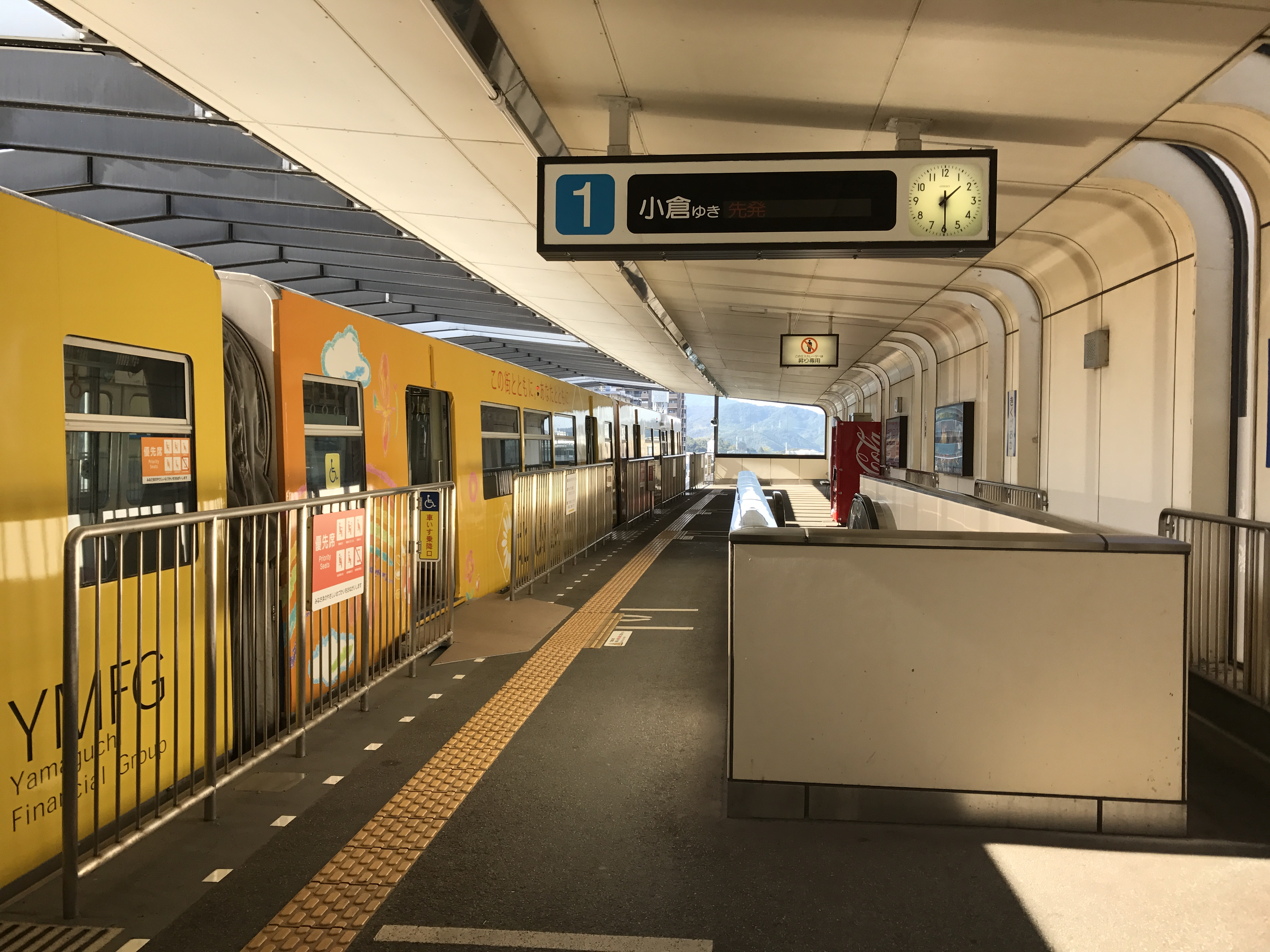
Platform
