= Kokura Station =

Railway station in Kitakyushu, Japan

Coordinates: 33°53′13″N 130°52′59″E

JA 28 JA 51 JF 01 JI 01 Kokura Station 小倉駅
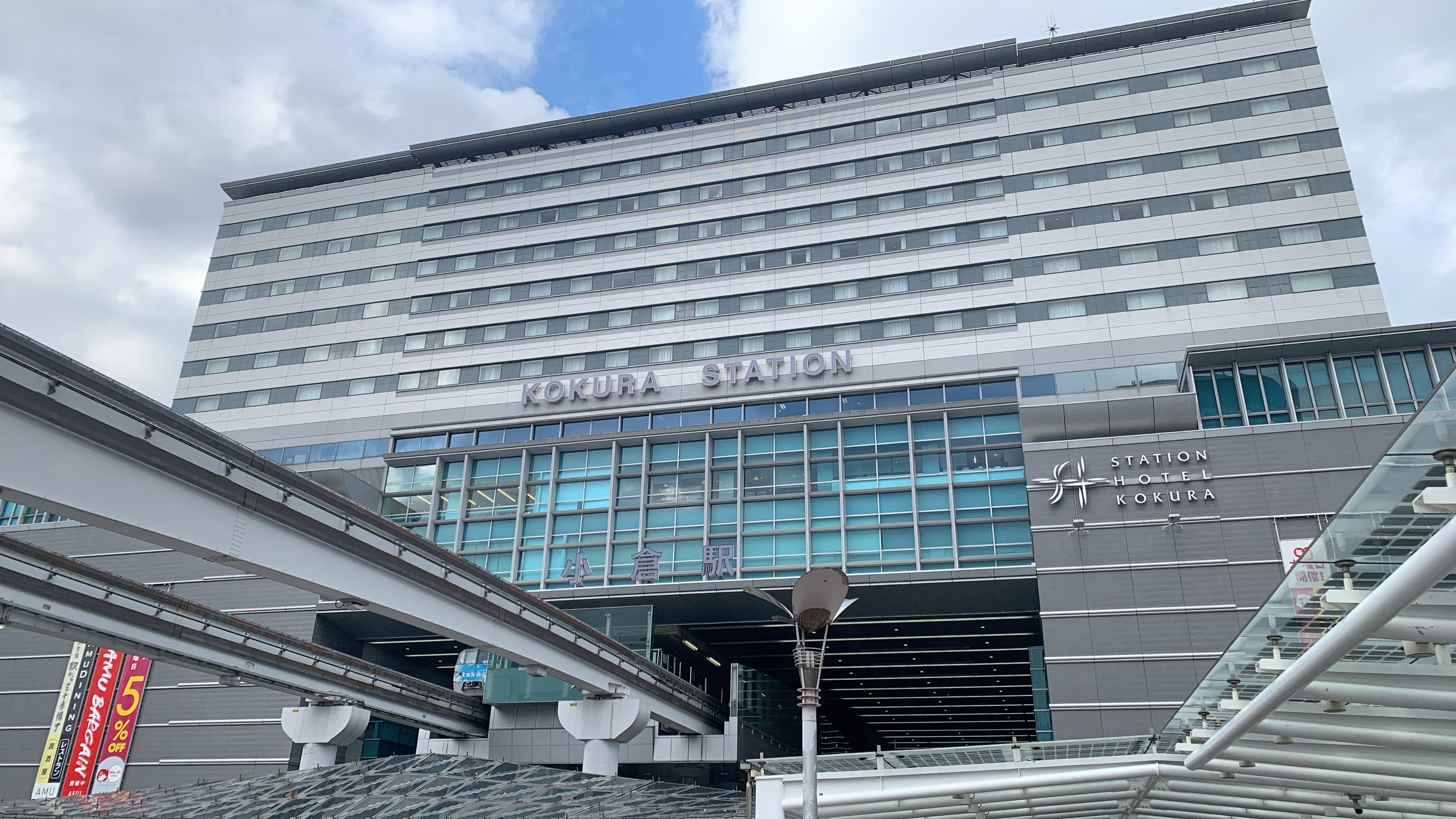

General information
- Location: Kokurakita-ku, Kitakyūshū; Fukuoka Prefecture; Japan
- Operator: JR Kyushu; JR West; Kitakyushu Monorail
- Lines: San'yō Shinkansen; JA Kagoshima Main Line; JF Nippō Main Line; Kokura Line
- Platforms: 2 island platforms (Shinkansen); 4 island platforms (Conventional lines)
- Tracks: 4 (Shinkansen); 8 (Conventional lines)

Construction
- Structure type: Elevated

Other information
- Station code: JA28/JA51/JF01/JI01

History
- Opened: 1 April 1891; 135 years ago

Passengers
- FY 2016: 35,431 daily
- Rank: 2nd (among JR Kyushu stations)

Services
| Preceding station | JR West | Following station |
|---|---|---|
| Hakata Terminus | San'yō Shinkansen Mizuho | Shin-Yamaguchi towards Shin-Ōsaka |
| Hakata Terminus | San'yō Shinkansen Sakura | Shin-Shimonoseki towards Shin-Ōsaka |
| Hakata Terminus | San'yō Shinkansen Nozomi | Shin-Yamaguchi towards Shin-Ōsaka |
| Hakata Terminus | San'yō Shinkansen Hikari | Shin-Shimonoseki towards Shin-Ōsaka |
| Hakata towards Hakata or Hakataminami | San'yō Shinkansen Kodama | Shin-Shimonoseki towards Shin-Ōsaka |
| Preceding station | JR Kyushu | Following station |
| Terminus | Nichirin | Yukuhashi towards Miyazaki Airport |
| Kurosaki JA 21 towards Hakata | Nichirin Sea Gaia | Yukuhashi towards Miyazaki Airport |
| Tobata JA 25 towards Hakata | Kirameki | Moji JA 29 towards Mojikō |
| Nishi-Kokura JA 27 towards Kagoshima | Kagoshima Main Line Rapid; Semi-Rapid; Local | Moji JA 29 towards Mojikō |
| Terminus | San'yō Line | Moji JA 52 towards Shimonoseki |
| Nishi-Kokura JF 02 towards Kagoshima | Nippō Main Line Rapid; Local | Terminus |
| Nishi-Kokura JI 02 towards Yoake | Hitahikosan Line | Terminus |
| Preceding station | Kitakyushu Monorail | Following station |
| Terminus | Kokura Line | Heiwadōri towards Kikugaoka |
Location
- Location within Kitakyushu Location within Fukuoka Prefecture Location within Japan

Kokura Station (小倉駅, Kokura-eki) in Kokurakita-ku is the main railway station in Kitakyushu, Japan. It is part of the JR Kyushu network and the San'yō Shinkansen stops here. It is the second largest station in Kyushu with 35,000 users daily. In the late 1990s, the Kokura station area was expanded and remodelled.

== Services ==
=== JR lines ===
- Kagoshima Main Line
- San'yō Shinkansen
- Nippō Main Line
- Hitahikosan Line

=== JR limited express trains ===
- San'yō Shinkansen Nozomi, Hikari, and Kodama (Tokyo - Shin-Ōsaka - Hakata)
- San'yō Shinkansen Mizuho, and Sakura (Shin-Ōsaka - (Kagoshima-Chūō by Kyushu Shinkansen)
- Sonic (Hakata - Yanagigaura/Ōita/Saiki)
- Nichirin Seagaia (Hakata - Miyazaki Kūkō)
- Kirameki (Mojikō/Kokura - Hakata)

=== Monorail ===
- Kitakyushu Monorail

== Tracks ==
| 1 | ■ Nippō Main Line | for Yukuhashi, Nakatsu, Usa and Ōita |
| 2 | ■ Hita Hikosan Line | for Tagawa-Gotōji, Soeda and Hita |
| 2 | ■ Kagoshima Main Line | for Mojikō |
| 2 | ■ Sanyō Main Line | for Shimonoseki |
| 3 | ■ Nippō Main Line | for Yukuhashi, Nakatsu, Usa and Ōita |
| 3 | ■ Hita Hikosan Line | for Tagawa-Gotōji, Soeda and Hita |
| 4 | ■ Limited Express Sonic, Nichirin Seagaia | for Orio and Hakata |
| 5 | ■ Limited Express Kirameki | for Orio and Hakata |
| 5 | ■ Kagoshima Main Line | for Orio and Hakata |
| 6 | ■ Limited Express Kirameki | for Orio and Hakata |
| 6 | ■ Kagoshima Main Line | for Orio and Hakata |
| 7 | ■ Limited Express Sonic, Nichirin Seagaia | for Oita, Miyazaki, and Miyazaki Kūkō |
| 7 | ■ Kagoshima Main Line | for Orio and Hakata |
| 7 | ■ Kagoshima Main Line | for Mojikō |
| 7 | ■ Sanyō Main Line | for Shimonoseki |
| 8 | ■ Limited Express Kirameki | for Mojikō |
| 8 | ■ Kagoshima Main Line | for Mojikō |
| 11・12 | ■ Sanyō Shinkansen Nozomi, Hikari (Hikari Rail Star), Mizuho, Sakura, Kodama | for Hakata, Kumamoto and Kagoshima-Chūō |
| 13 | ■ Sanyō Shinkansen Nozomi, Hikari (Hikari Rail Star), Mizuho, Sakura, Kodama | for Hiroshima, Okayama, Shin-Ōsaka, and Tokyo |
| 14 | ■ Sanyō Shinkansen Nozomi, Hikari (Hikari Rail Star), Kodama | for Hiroshima, Okayama, Shin-Ōsaka, and Tokyo |
| 14 | ■ Sanyō Shinkansen Kodama | for Hakata (Used for first departures) |

== History ==
- April 1, 1891: Opened by the private company Kyushu Tetsudo in front of Kokura Castle.
- July 1, 1907: Brought under state control.
- March 1, 1958: Reconstructed 700 meters east of original location (the former station site is now known as Nishi ("West") Kokura).
- March 10, 1975: Sanyo Shinkansen services commenced.
- April 1, 1987: Following privatisation of JNR it came under the control of JR Kyushu. The Shinkansen platforms are run by JR West.
- April 1, 1998: Kitakyushu Monorail line is extended to Kokura Station as part of a major reconstruction of the station building.

== Passenger statistics ==
In fiscal 2016, the station was used by an average of 35,431 passengers daily (boarding passengers only), and it ranked 2nd among the busiest stations of JR Kyushu.

== Surrounding area ==
- Kokura Castle
- Kitakyushu Stadium
- West Japan General Exhibition Center
- Kitakyushu International Conference Center

== Gallery ==
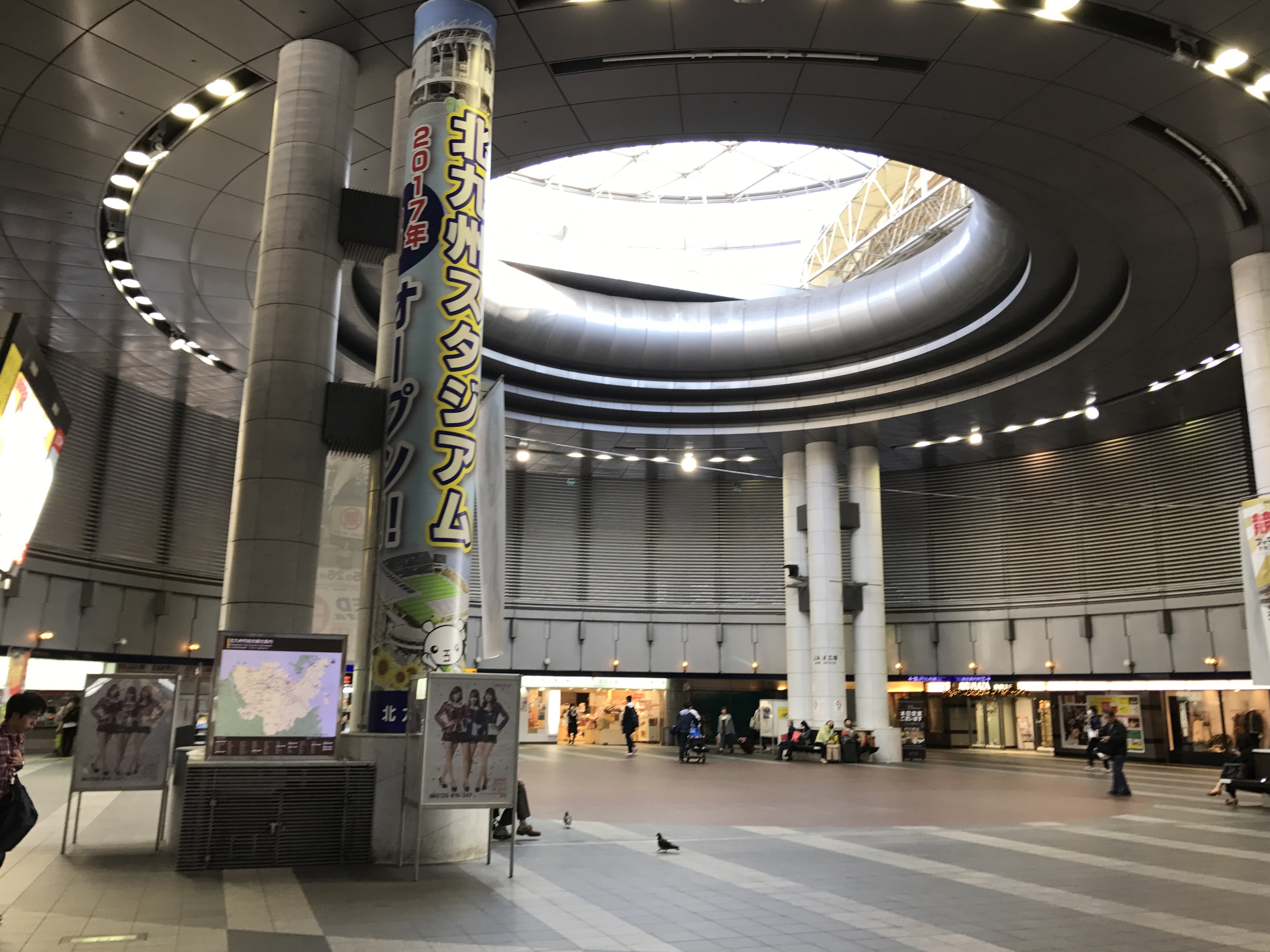
Station concourse

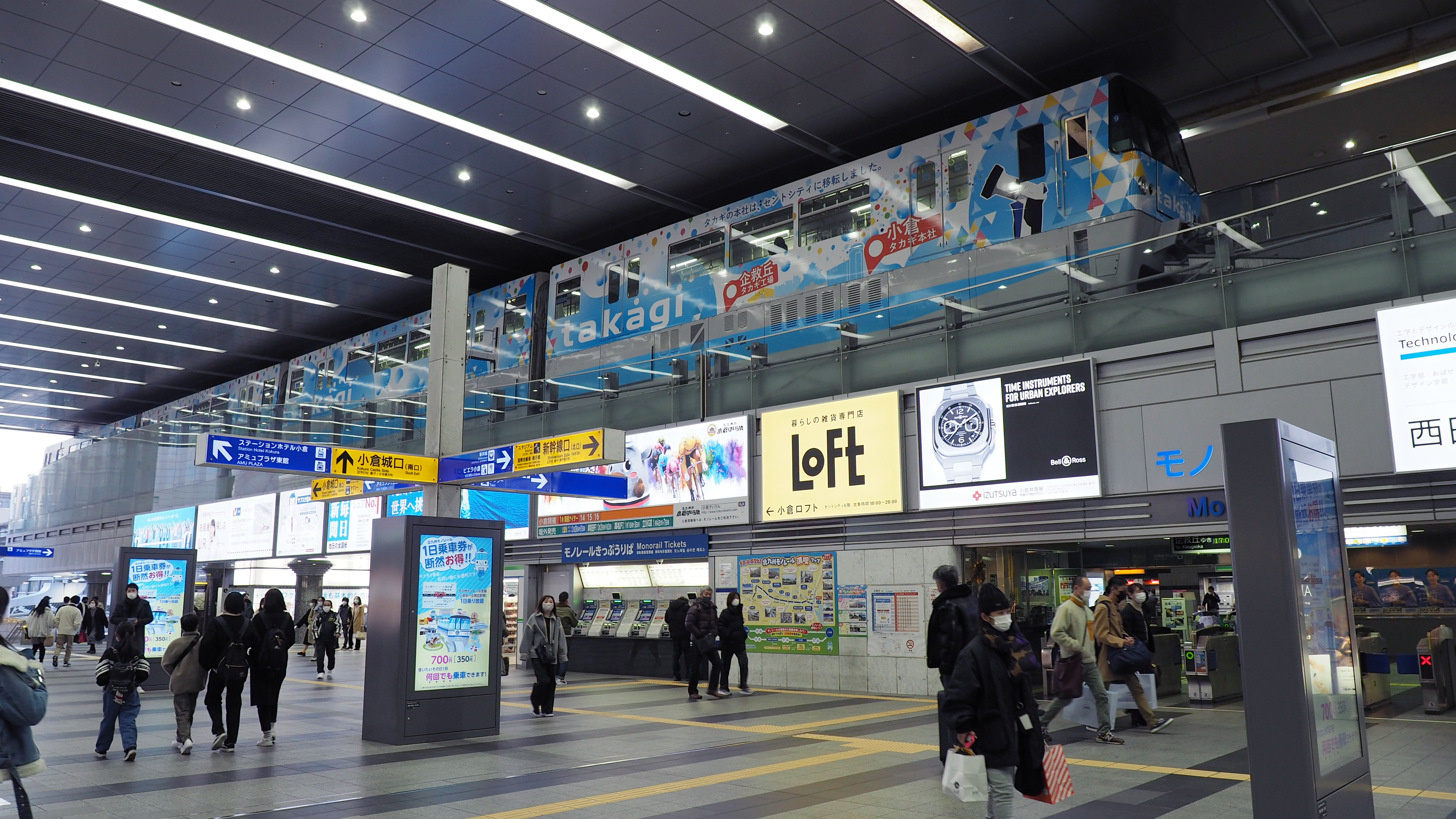
Monorail station

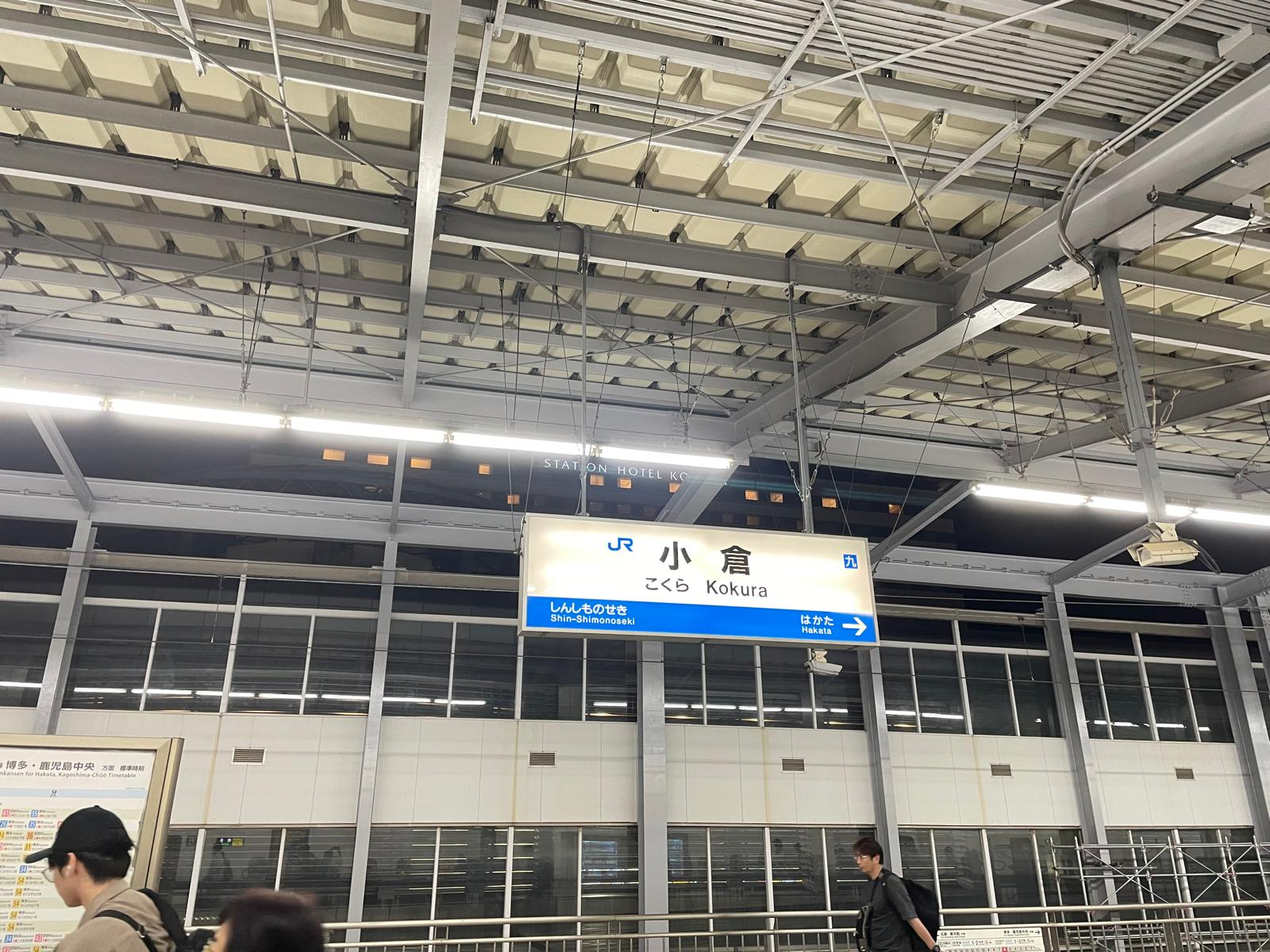
Kokura station on Sanyo Shinkansen line between Hakata and Shin-Shimonoseki Stations
