= Kokuraminami-ku =

Ward of Kitakyūshū, Fukuoka Prefecture, Japan

Coordinates: 33°50′47″N 130°53′5″E

Location of Kokuraminami-ku in Kitakyūshū

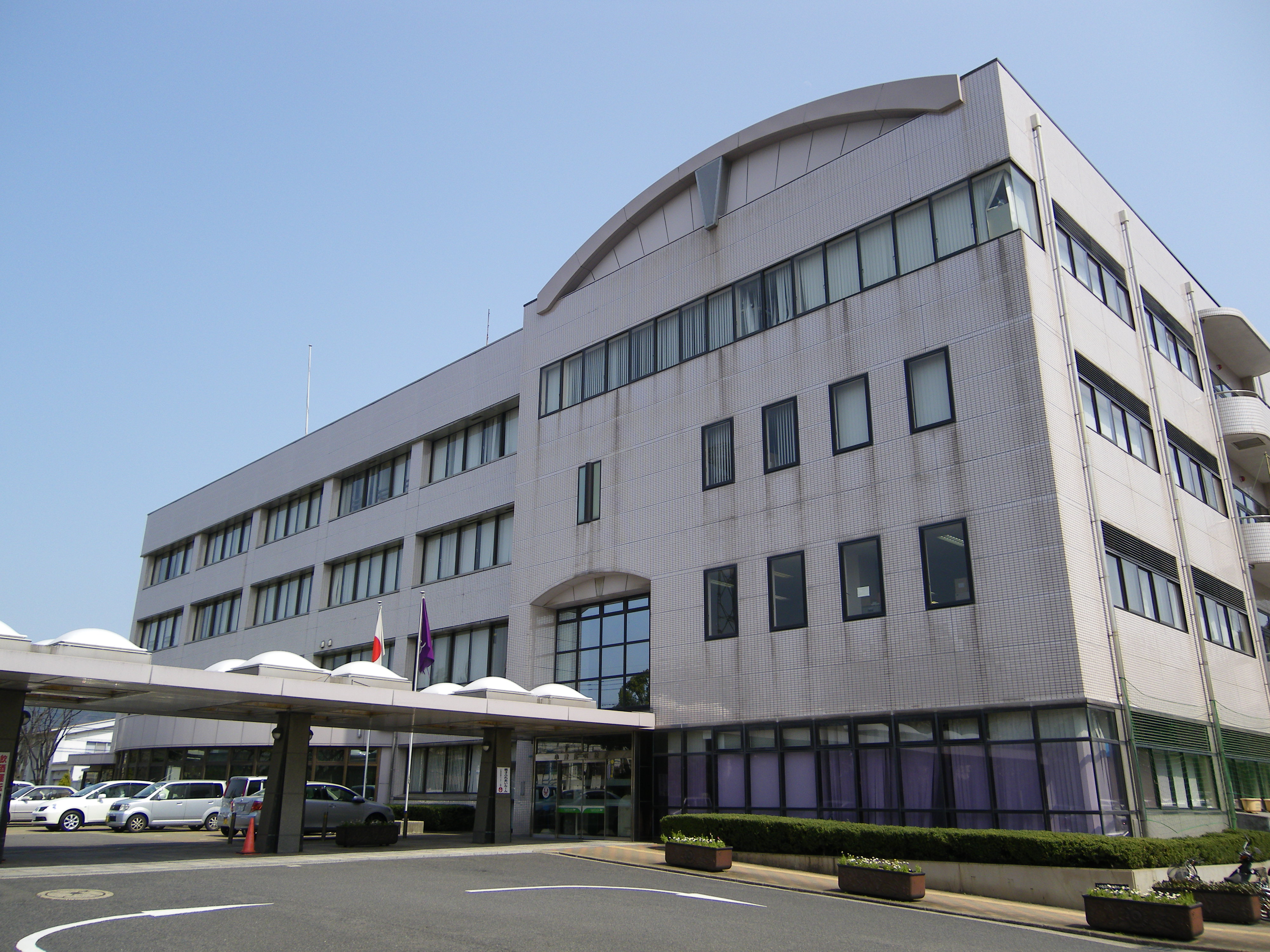
Kokuraminami-ku Ward Government Building

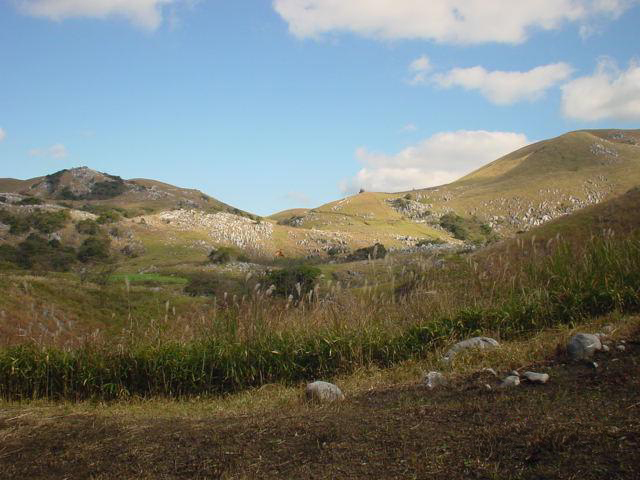
Hiraodai karst plateau in Kokura Minami ward

Kokuraminami-ku (小倉南区) is a ward of Kitakyūshū, Fukuoka, Japan. It is the southern part of what used to be Kokura City, which was merged into Kitakyūshū city when the latter was created out of the merger of five cities in 1963. At this time Kokura was divided into North and South wards.

Kokuraminami ward is mainly rural and undeveloped, and includes the Hiraodai karst plateau and Sugao no taki (waterfall). However, it also includes the present airport and the airport buildings of the new Kitakyūshū Airport, and Shimosone shopping mall.

Population (2000 national census): 213,741
Area: 170.25 km^{2} (includes northern part of the new airport island)

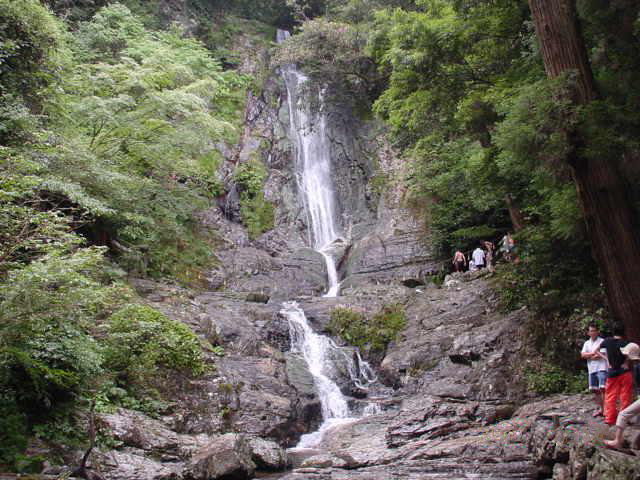
Sugao waterfall (菅生の滝) in midsummer

== Economy ==
StarFlyer has its headquarters on the grounds of Kitakyūshū Airport in Kokuraminami-ku.

== Tourist attractions ==
- Hiraodai Nature Observation Center

== See also ==
- Kokura Airport, formerly known as Kitakyushu airport
- New Kitakyushu Airport
- Akiyoshi plateau in nearby Yamaguchi prefecture
