= Chikuzen-Iwaya Station =

Railway station in Tōhō, Fukuoka Prefecture, Japan

Chikuzen-Iwaya Station 筑前岩屋駅
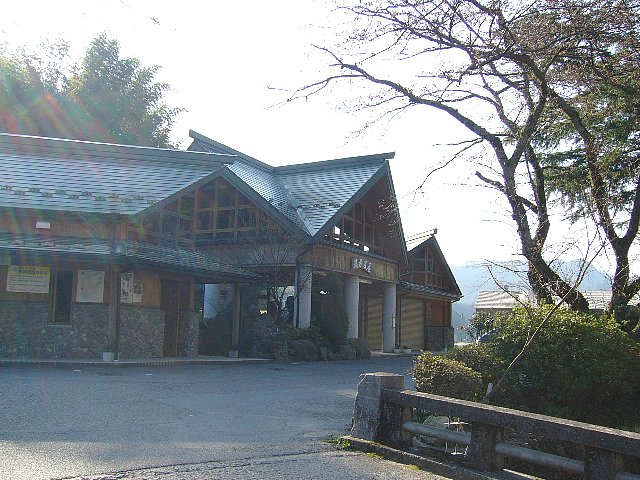
- Chikuzen-Iwaya Station in April 2006

General information
- Location: Japan
- Coordinates: 33°25′51.16″N 130°52′53.32″E
- Operator: JR Kyushu
- Line: ■ Hitahikosan Line

Other information
- Website: Official website
Location
- Location within Japan

Chikuzen-Iwaya Station (筑前岩屋駅, Chikuzen-Iwaya-eki) is a bus transit station on the Hitahikosan Line in Tōhō, Asakura District, Fukuoka Prefecture, Japan, operated by Kyushu Railway Company (JR Kyushu). To the north of the station, the 4380 m Shakadake Tunnel can be clearly seen, where a fatal tunnel collapse occurred during construction in 1953, killing 21 construction workers.

== Lines ==
Chikuzen-Iwaya Station is served by the Hitahikosan Line.

== Adjacent stations ==
«	Service	»
Hitahikosan Line
Hikosan	Local	Daigyōji

== See also ==
- List of railway stations in Japan
