= Dichomeris oceanis =

Scientific classification
- Kingdom: Animalia
- Phylum: Arthropoda
- Class: Insecta
- Order: Lepidoptera
- Family: Gelechiidae
- Genus: Dichomeris
- Species: D. oceanis

Binomial name
- Dichomeris oceanis Meyrick, 1920

Synonyms
- Ypsolophus limitellus Caradja, 1920

Species of moth

Dichomeris oceanis is a moth in the family Gelechiidae. It was described by Edward Meyrick in 1920. It is found in south-eastern Siberia, Japan, China (Heilongjiang, Beijing, Shandong, Gansu, Shaanxi, Zhejiang), Korea, and Taiwan.

The wingspan is 18–20 mm (0.71–0.79 in). The forewings are ochreous, faintly greenish tinged with a narrow dark indigo-blue irregular-edged streak along the costa from the base to near the middle, its apex sending a lighter blue streak to the first discal stigma. Beyond this, on the costa, are three dark fuscous oblique strigulae tipped with bluish, and then an elongate dark fuscous mark terminated beneath by a small bluish mark. The stigmata are approximated, black, the plical beneath the first discal, these are somewhat elongated and connected by a dark grey spot, the second discal forming a transverse mark tipped with bluish, connected with the preceding by two short grey streaks or some faint suffusion. There is a narrow dark grey fascia along the termen from before the tornus to the apex, the anterior extremity sending a slender suffused streak to the lower end of the second discal stigma, with the terminal edge finely whitish. The hindwings are grey, in males paler anteriorly.

The larvae feed on Wisteria floribunda, Wisteria sinensis, Wisteria brachybotrys, Wisteriopsis japonica and Quercus species.
