= Miwa, Fukuoka =

Dissolved municipality in Fukuoka prefecture, Japan

Miwa (三輪町, Miwa-machi) was a town located in Asakura District, Fukuoka Prefecture, Japan.

As of 2003, the town had an estimated population of 12,746 and a density of 587.10 persons per km^{2}. The total area was 21.71 km^{2}.

On March 22, 2005, Miwa, along with the town of Yasu (also from Asakura District), was merged to create the town of Chikuzen.
