= Chikuzen =

Chikuzen may refer to:

- Chikuzen Province, an old province of Japan
- Chikuzen, Fukuoka, a present town in Japan
