= Dichomeris yanagawanus =

Scientific classification
- Kingdom: Animalia
- Phylum: Arthropoda
- Clade: Pancrustacea
- Class: Insecta
- Order: Lepidoptera
- Family: Gelechiidae
- Genus: Dichomeris
- Species: D. yanagawanus

Binomial name
- Dichomeris yanagawanus Matsumura, 1931

Species of insect

Dichomeris yanagawanus is a moth in the family Gelechiidae. It was described by Shōnen Matsumura in 1931. It is found in Japan.

Lepidoptera and Some Other Life Forms lists this name as a synonym of Dichomeris oceanis Meyrick, 1920.
