= Yasu, Fukuoka =

Dissolved municipality in Fukuoka prefecture, Japan

Yasu (夜須町, Yasu-machi) was a town located in Asakura District, Fukuoka Prefecture, Japan.

As of 2003, the town has an estimated population of 16,568 and a density of 364.37 persons per km^{2}. The total area is 45.47 km^{2}.

On March 22, 2005, Yasu, along with the town of Miwa (also from Asakura District), was merged to create the town of Chikuzen.
