= Haki, Fukuoka =

Dissolved municipality in Fukuoka prefecture, Japan

Haki (杷木町, Haki-machi) was a town located in Asakura District, Fukuoka Prefecture, Japan.

As of 2003, the town had an estimated population of 8,372 and a density of 186.13 persons per km^{2}. The total area was 44.98 km^{2}.

On March 20, 2006, Haki, along with the former town of Asakura (also from Asakura District), and the city of Amagi, was merged to create the city of Asakura.
