= Hikosan Station =

Railway station in Japan

Hikosan Station 彦山駅
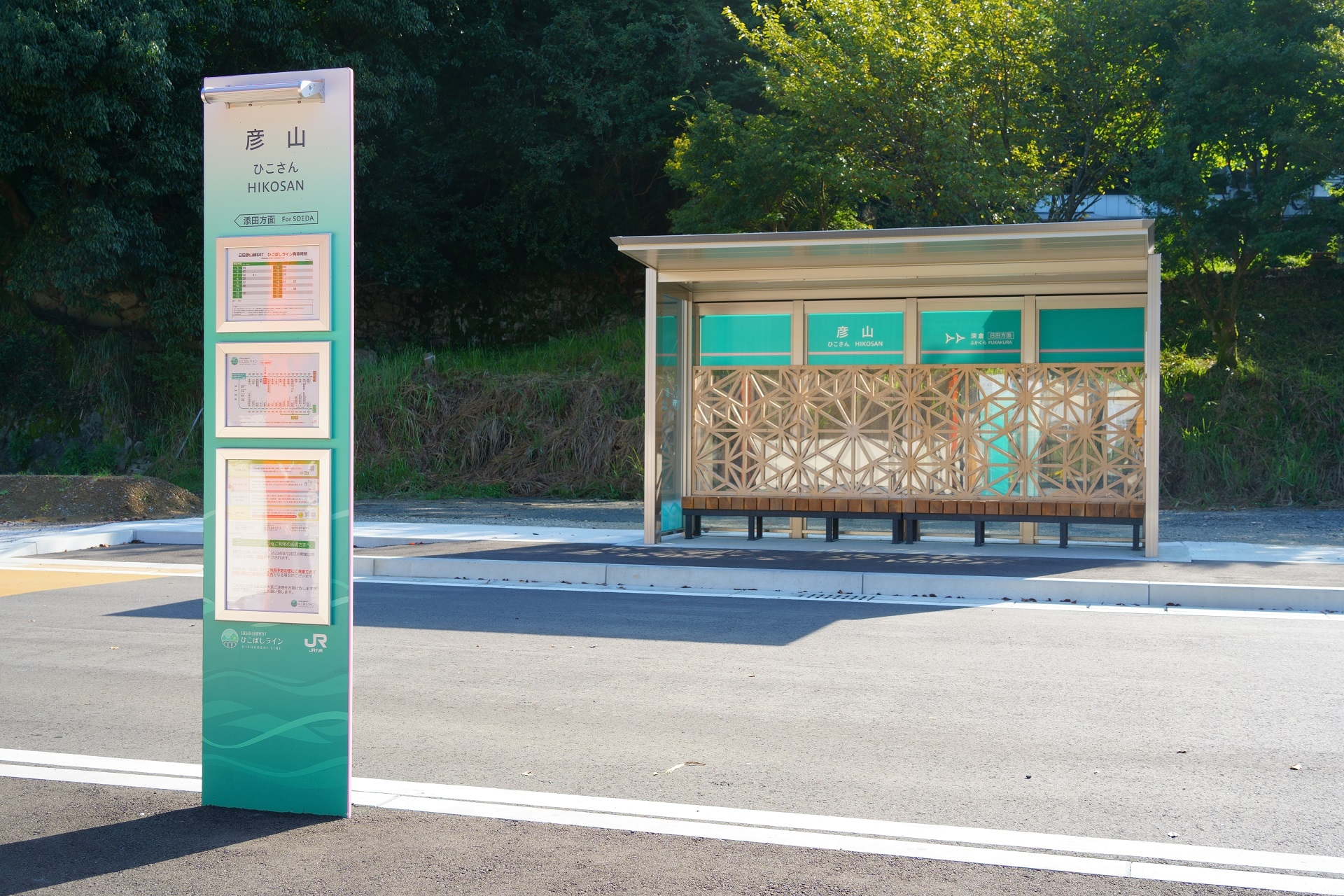
- Hikosan BRT stop in 2023

General information
- Location: Ochiai 800, Soeda-cho, Tagawa-gun, Fukuoka-ken; Japan
- Coordinates: 33°30′03″N 130°52′09″E
- Operator: JR Kyushu
- Line: ■ Hitahikosan Line
- Distance: 47.2 km from Jōno
- Platforms: 2 side platforms

Other information
- Status: Unstaffed
- Website: Official website

History
- Opened: 25 August 1942
- Closed: 5 July 2017

Services
Preceding station	JR Kyushu	Following station
Chikuzen-Iwaya towards Yoake	Hitahikosan Line	Buzen-Masuda towards Kokura
Location
- Location within Fukuoka Prefecture Location within Japan

Hikosan Station (彦山駅, Hikosan-eki) was a passenger railway station located in the town of Soeda, Fukuoka Prefecture, Japan. It is operated by JR Kyushu.

== Lines ==
Hikosan Station was served by the Hitahikosan Line and was located 47.2 km from the starting point of the line at Jōno. Hikosan is the last station for southbound trains before entering the 4380 m Shakadake Tunnel between here and Chikuzen Iwaya Station, which involved a fatal collapse during construction in 1953, claiming the lives of 21 construction workers.

== Layout ==
The railway station consisted of two opposed side platforms connected by a level crossing. The station was unattended. After the discontinuation of train service, equipment attached to the railway station will be removed, and the platform and surrounding railway tracks was removed.

== History ==
The station opened on 25 August 1942. On 5 July 2017, all services were suspended due to damage to the tracks and railway infrastructure due to torrential rains. Rail service was officially replaced by a Bus Rapid Transit (BRT) service on 28 August 2023.

== Surrounding area ==
- Mount Hiko
- Hikosan Jingū
- Japan National Route 500

== See also ==
- List of railway stations in Japan
