= Yakenotōge Kofun =

Kofun period burial mound in Fukuoka Prefecture, Japan

- 焼ノ峠古墳 (Japanese)
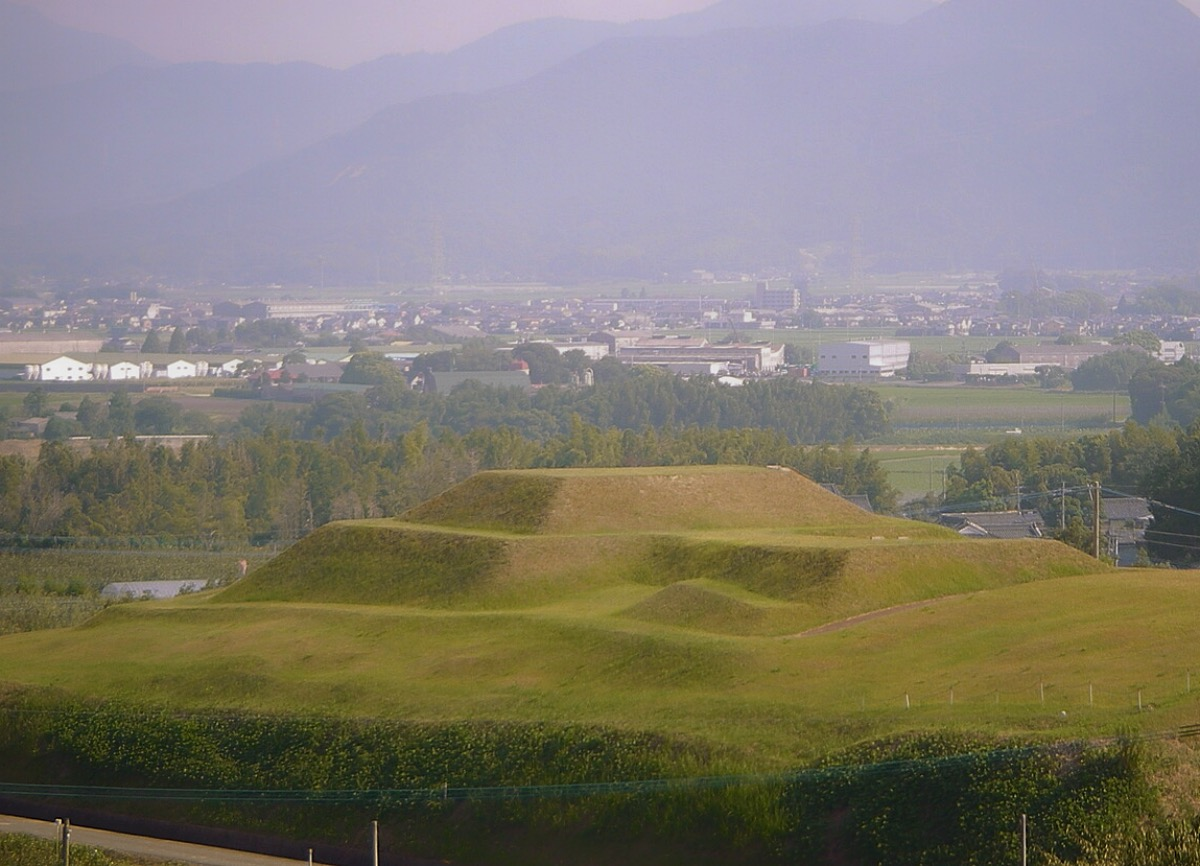
- Yakenotōge Kofun

- Yakenotōge Kofun Yakenotōge Kofun (Japan)
- Interactive map of Yakenotōge Kofun
- 33°25′36″N 130°35′55″E
- Type: Kofun
- Periods: Kofun period
- Location: Chikuzen, Fukuoka, Japan
- Region: Kyushu

History
- Built: c.3rd century

Site notes
- Public access: Yes (no facilities)

The Yakenotōge Kofun (焼ノ峠古墳) is a Kofun period burial mound or tumulus, located in the Shisojima neighborhood of the town of Chikuzen, Fukuoka Prefecture, Japan. The tumulus was designated a National Historic Site of Japan in 1975.

== Overview ==
The Yakenotōge Kofun is located is located on a ridge extending north from Shiroyama, a small, independent hill in the northwestern part of the Chikugo Plain. It is a "two conjoined rectangles" style (zenpō-kōhō-fun (前方後方墳)) tumulus, which is extremely rare for Kyushu. It is orientated to the south-south east, and has a total length of approximately 40.5 meters. The posterior portion is 23.5 meters on each side, and approximately 4.5 meters in height.The anterior part is 17 meters long, 12 meters wide, and approximately two meters high, and the width at the waist is 8.5 meters. The tumulus is surrounded by a moat about two meters wide. The posterior portion is thought to have been constructed in two stages, with the second stage being a mound of earth on top of the first stage, which was carved out of the ground. The anterior portion was entirely carved out of the ground. A vertical burial chamber was confirmed in the center of the posterior portion; however, a complete archaeological excavation has not been performed.

An ancient-style double-rimmed jar and a wide-mouthed jar was found near the surrounding moat. Judging from these Haji ware pottery shards, the tumulus is believed to date to the early Kofun period. The tumulus is approximately 20 minutes by car from Tsuko Station on the Nishitetsu Tenjin Ōmuta Line.

== See also ==
- List of Historic Sites of Japan (Fukuoka)
