= Daigyōji Station =

Railway station in Tōhō, Fukuoka Prefecture, Japan

Daigyōji Station 大行司駅
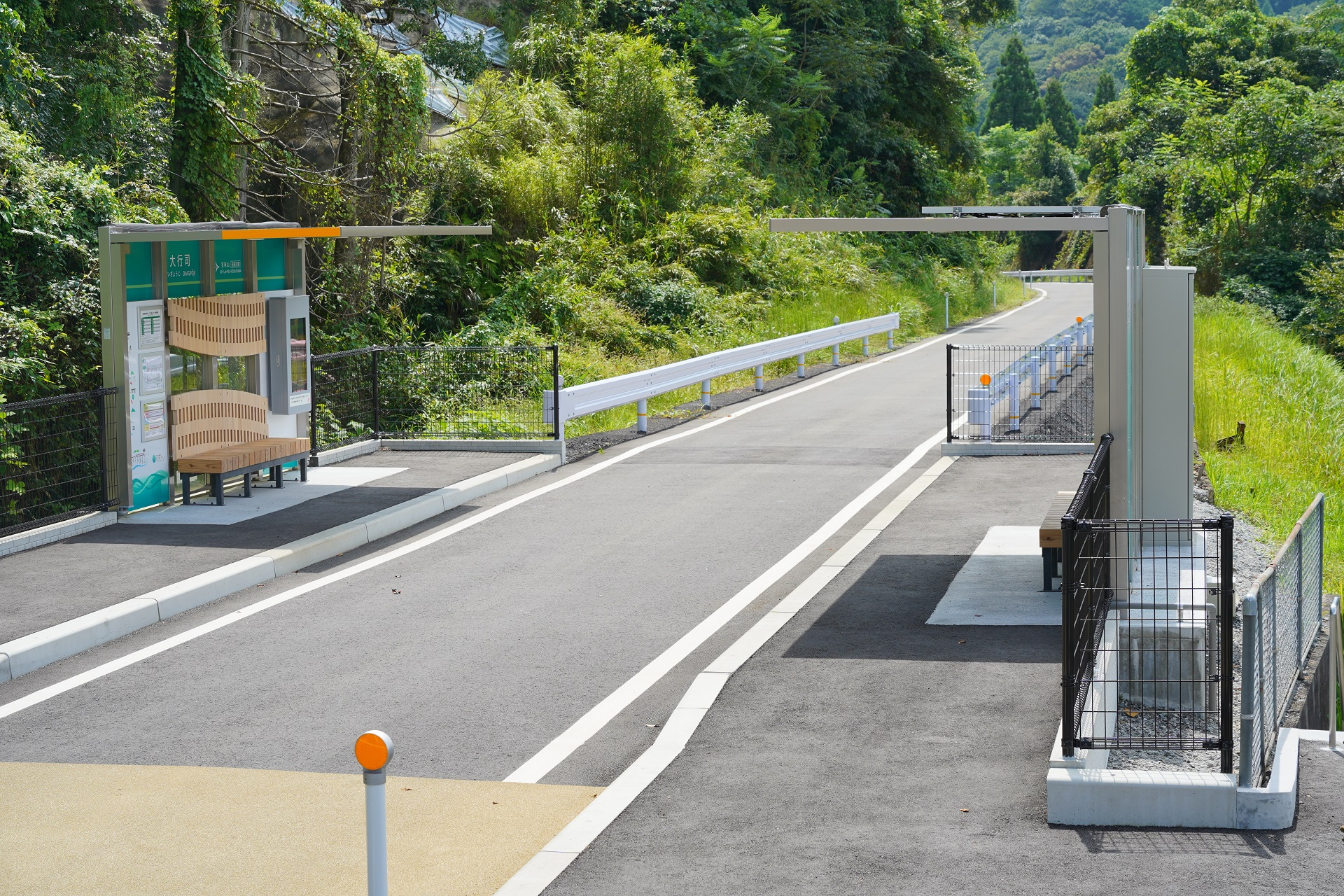
- Daigyōji BRT Station in September 2023

General information
- Location: Japan
- Coordinates: 33°23′47.41″N 130°52′28.41″E
- Operator: JR Kyushu
- Line: ■ Hitahikosan Line

Other information
- Website: Official website
Location
- Location within Japan

Daigyōji Station (大行司駅, Daigyōji-eki) is a bus stop and former railway station on the Hitahikosan Line in Tōhō, Fukuoka, Japan, operated by Kyushu Railway Company (JR Kyushu).

== Lines ==
Daigyōji Station is served by the Hitahikosan Line.

== Station layout ==
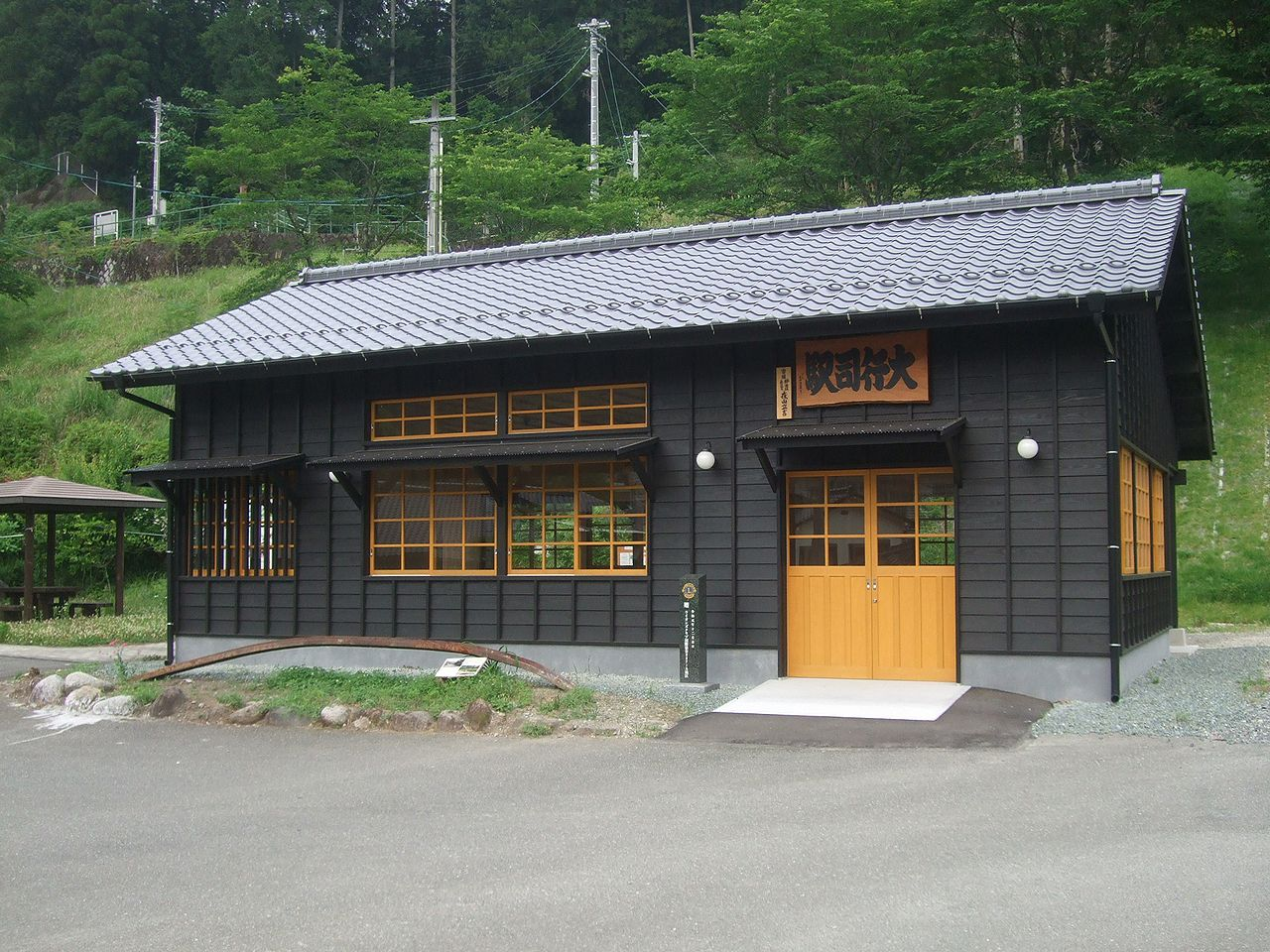
The station building after the rebuild

Access to the station is through a 77 step staircase, or through a steep footpath. The station building is located at the bottom of the stairs.

The current bus stop has a bus shelter for each direction of travel.

The former railway station consisted of 2 side platforms serving two tracks.

== History ==
The station opened in September 20, 1946 when the Hitahikosan Line was extended from Hoshuyama station to Daigyoji. Coal was transported from this station until the local mine closed in 1963. Ownership of the station building was transferred to the local government in 2008 after the station became unmanned, and a coffee shop was opened in the station.

The station building was destroyed by a landslide during heavy rains in the region on July 5 2017. The building was re-built and opened on December 22 2019, albert with no railway service.

The railway line was replaced with a BRT, which began operations on August 28, 2023.

== Adjacent stations ==
«	Service	»
Hitahikosan Line
Chikuzen-Iwaya	Local	Hōshuyama

== See also ==
- List of railway stations in Japan
