= Amagi, Fukuoka =

Amagi 甘木市
- Former City
- Flag Emblem
- Interactive map of Amagi
- Country: Japan
- Region: Kyushu
- Prefecture: Fukuoka Prefecture

Area
  - Total: 167.19 km^{2} (64.55 sq mi)

Population (October 1, 2005)
  - Total: 41,675
  - Density: 249.27/km^{2} (645.60/sq mi)
- Time zone: UTC+09:00 (JST)
- City hall address: 412-2 Fukuoka Prefecture, Amagi City; 868-8601
- Symbols
- Bird: Warbling white-eye
- Flower: Wisteria
- Tree: Boxwood

Amagi (甘木市, Amagi-shi) was a city located in Fukuoka Prefecture, Japan. The city existed from April 1, 1954.

As of 2003, the city had an estimated population of 42,449 with a population density of 253.90 persons per km^{2}. The total area was 167.19 km^{2}.

On March 20, 2006, Amagi, along with the towns of Asakura and Haki (both from Asakura District), was merged to create the city of Asakura.
