= Tōhō, Fukuoka =

Tōhō 東峰村
- Village
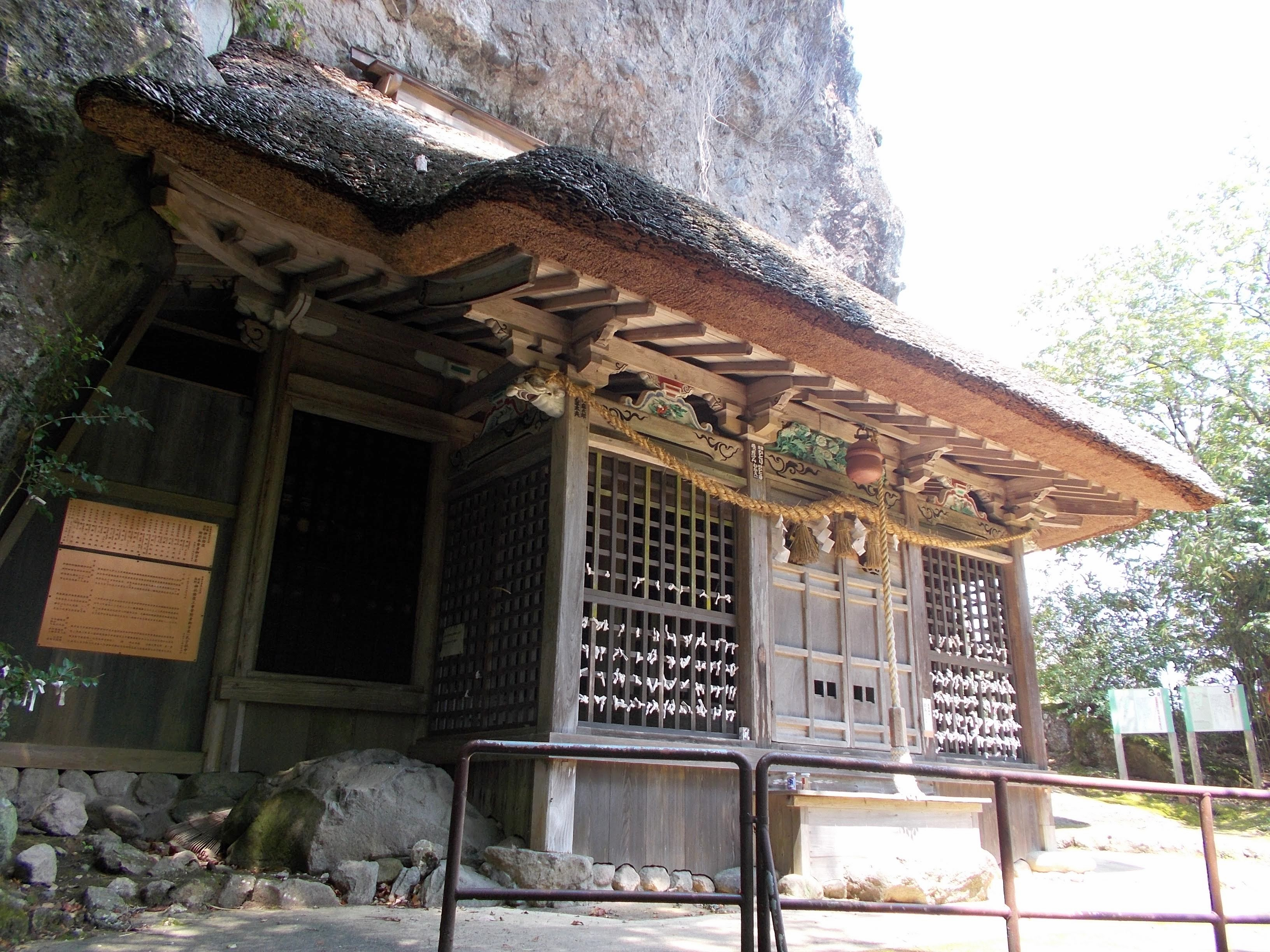
- Iwaya Shrine

- Flag Seal
- Location of Tōhō in Fukuoka Prefecture

- Location in Japan
- Coordinates: 33°23′50″N 130°52′12″E
- Country: Japan
- Region: Kyushu
- Prefecture: Fukuoka
- District: Asakura

Area
  - Total: 51.97 km^{2} (20.07 sq mi)

Population (December 31, 2023)
  - Total: 1,842
  - Density: 35.44/km^{2} (91.80/sq mi)
- Time zone: UTC+09:00 (JST)
- City hall address: 6425 Hōshuyama, Tōhō-mura, Asakura-gun, Fukuoka-ken 838-1792
- Website: Official website

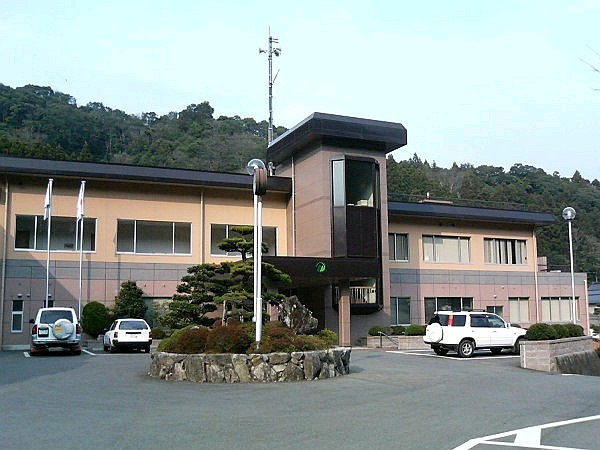
Tōhō Village Hall

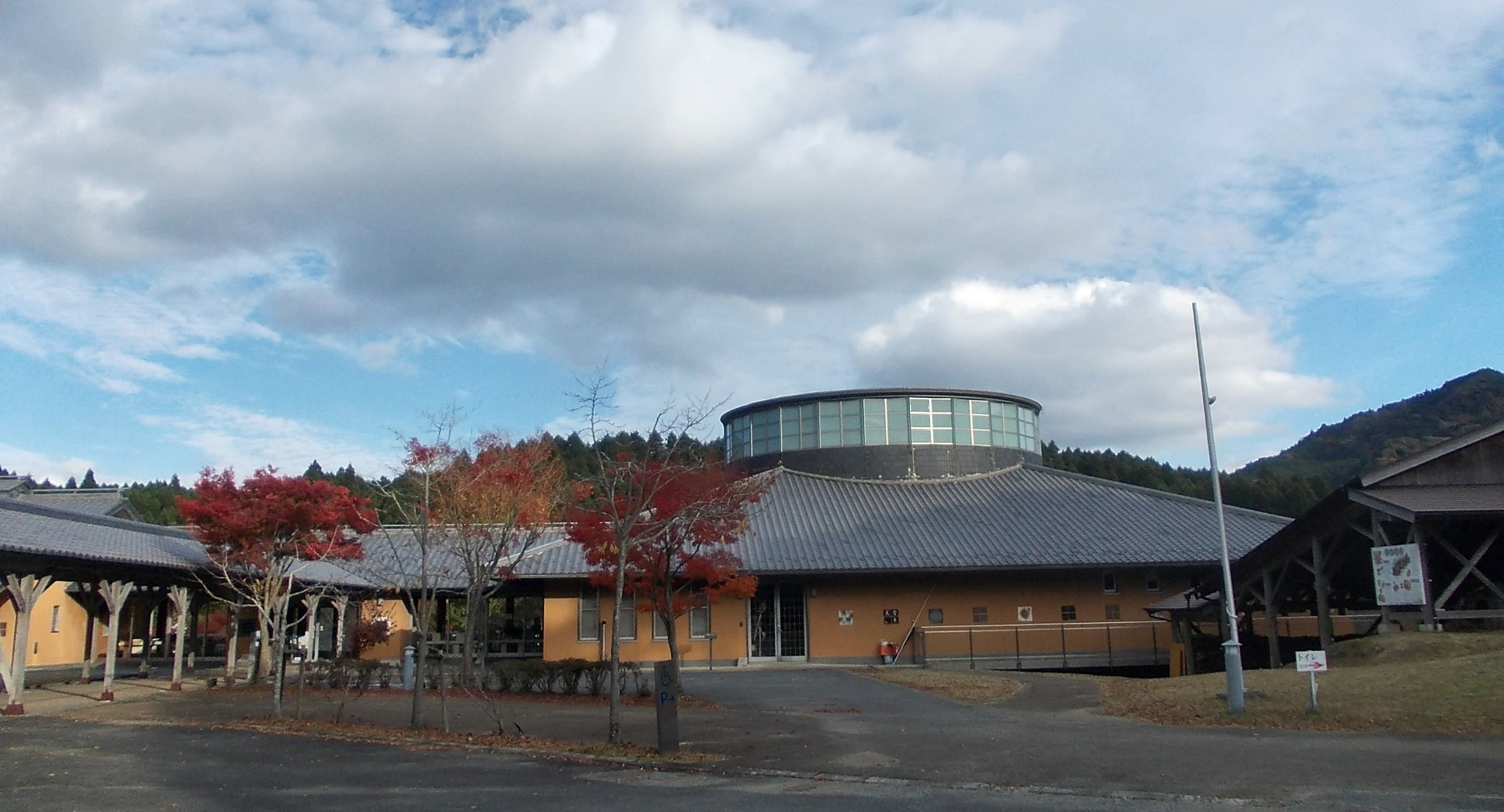
Traditional Industry Hall of Koishiwara Pottery

Tōhō (東峰村, Tōhō-mura) is a village located in Asakura District, Fukuoka Prefecture, Japan. As of 31 March 2023, the village had an estimated population of 1842 in 811 households, and a population density of 35 persons per km². The total area of the village is 51.97 km^{2} (20.07 sq mi).

== Geography ==
Tōhō is located in the southeastern part of Fukuoka Prefecture and borders Hita City in Oita Prefecture. Most of the village area is mountainous, and a small portion is agricultural.

=== Neighboring municipalities ===
Fukuoka Prefecture

- Asakura
- Kama
- Soeda

Ōita Prefecture

- Hita

=== Demographics ===
Per Japanese census data, the population of Tōhō is as shown below

Historical population
Year	Pop.	±%
1940	7,425	—
1950	8,666	+16.7%
1960	6,352	−26.7%
1970	4,190	−34.0%
1980	3,594	−14.2%
1990	3,371	−6.2%
2000	2,948	−12.5%
2010	2,433	−17.5%
2020	1,899	−21.9%

=== Climate ===
Tōhō has a humid subtropical climate (Köppen Cfa) characterized by warm summers and cool winters with light to no snowfall. The average annual temperature in Tōhō is 15.2 °C. The average annual rainfall is 1532 mm with September as the wettest month. The temperatures are highest on average in August, at around 26.3 °C, and lowest in January, at around 4.2 °C.

== History ==
The area of Tōhō was part of ancient Chikuzen Province, but was on the border of Buzen and Bungo Provinces. During the Edo Period, the area was part of the holdings of Fukuoka Domain. The villages of Koishiwara and Hōshuyama in Asakura District were established on May 1, 1889 with the creation of the modern municipalities system. The two villages merged on March 28, 2005 to form the village of Tōhō.

== Government ==
Tōhō has a mayor-council form of government with a directly elected mayor and a unicameral village council of ten members. Tōhō, collectively with the city of Asakura and town of Chikuzen contributes two members to the Fukuoka Prefectural Assembly. In terms of national politics, the village is part of the Fukuoka 5th district of the lower house of the Diet of Japan.

== Economy ==
Tōhō has a mainly rural economy based on agriculture. The village is also a production centre of Koishiwara ware.

== Education ==
Tōhō has one public combined elementary/junior high school operated by the village government. The village does not have a high school.

== Transportation ==
=== Railways ===
Tōhō ceased to have passenger railway service when the lines of the JR Kyushu Hitahikosan Line suffered severe damage due to torrential rains in July 2017. The former rail service has been replaced by a Bus Rapid Transit (BRT) operation.

JR Kyushu - Hitahikosan Line

- < Daigyōji - Hōshuyama >*

=== Highways ===
- National Route 211
- National Route 500
