= Koishiwara, Fukuoka =

Dissolved municipality in Fukuoka prefecture, Japan

Koishiwara (小石原村, Koishiwara-mura) was a village located in Asakura District, Fukuoka Prefecture, Japan.

The village gave its name to a style of pottery called Koishiwara ware.

On March 28, 2005, Koishiwara, along with the village of Hōshuyama (also from Asakura District), was merged to create the village of Tōhō.
