= Hōshuyama Station =

Railway station in Tōhō, Fukuoka Prefecture, Japan

Hōshuyama Station 宝珠山駅
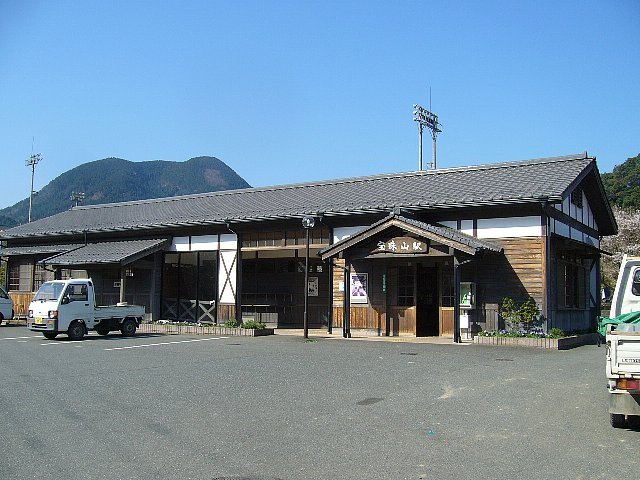
- Hōshuyama Station in March 2006

General information
- Location: Japan
- Coordinates: 33°22′44.45″N 130°52′46.38″E
- Operator: JR Kyushu
- Line: ■ Hitahikosan Line

Other information
- Website: Official website
Location
- Location within Japan

Hōshuyama Station (宝珠山駅, Hōshuyama-eki) is a railway station on the Hitahikosan Line in Tōhō, Fukuoka, Japan, operated by Kyushu Railway Company (JR Kyushu).

It is the only railway station in Kyushu to span two prefectures; two-thirds of the station are in Fukuoka Prefecture and the remaining third is in Ōita Prefecture.

== Lines ==
Hōshuyama Station is served by the Hitahikosan Line.

== Adjacent stations ==
«	Service	»
Hitahikosan Line
Daigyōji	Local	Ōtsuru

== See also ==
- List of railway stations in Japan
