= Hōshuyama, Fukuoka =

Dissolved municipality in Fukuoka prefecture, Japan

Hōshuyama (宝珠山村, Hōshuyama-mura) was a village located in Asakura District, Fukuoka Prefecture, Japan.

As of 2003, the village had an estimated population of 1,663 and a density of 73.71 persons per km^{2}. The total area was 22.56 km^{2}.

On March 28, 2005, Hōshuyama, along with the village of Koishiwara (also from Asakura District), was merged to create the village of Tōhō.
