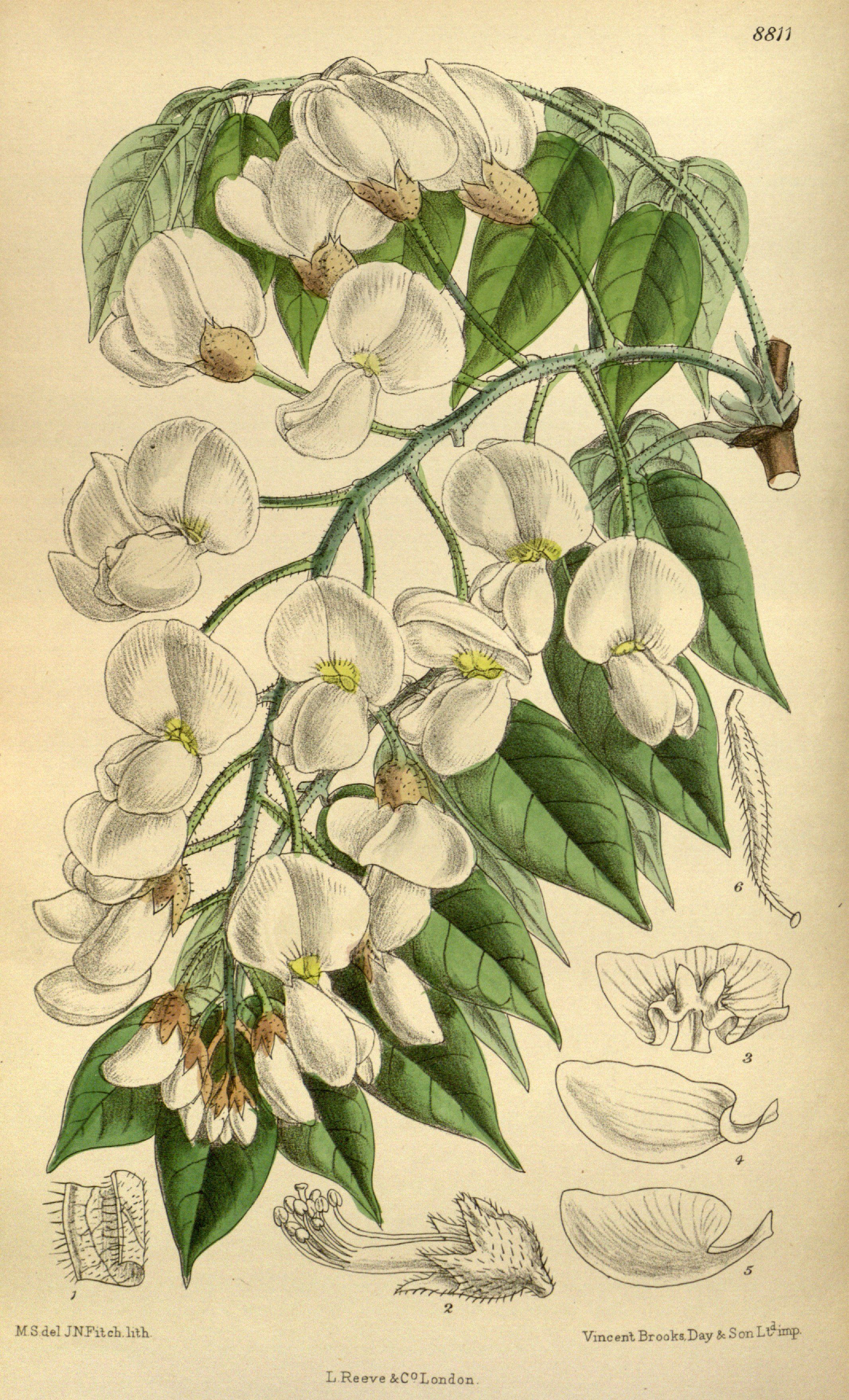

Scientific classification
- Kingdom: Plantae
- Clade: Tracheophytes
- Clade: Angiosperms
- Clade: Eudicots
- Clade: Rosids
- Order: Fabales
- Family: Fabaceae
- Subfamily: Faboideae
- Genus: Wisteria
- Species: W. brachybotrys

Binomial name
- Wisteria brachybotrys Siebold & Zucc.

= Wisteria brachybotrys =

Species of legume

Wisteria brachybotrys, the silky wisteria, is a species of flowering plant in the pea family Fabaceae from Japan. Some older references believed it to be of garden origin. It is widely cultivated in its native Japan, with the white flowered cultivars more widely grown than the pale violet cultivars. It is native to western parts of Honshu and throughout Shikoku and Kyushu, growing in mountain forests and woods from 100 to 900m.

The Greek specific epithet brachybotrys means "short clusters".

Growing to 19 m (62 ft) or more, it is a deciduous anticlockwise twining woody climber with hairy leaves to 35 cm (14 in) long, each leaf comprising up to 13 leaflets. The scented flowers, borne in late spring and early summer, are pale violet or white with a yellow blotch at the base. They hang in racemes up to 15 cm (5.9 in) long. They are followed by felted green seedpods containing pea-like seeds. These are reported to be toxic if ingested in quantity.

Like its more famous cousins, Wisteria sinensis (Chinese wisteria) and Wisteria floribunda (Japanese wisteria), it requires support when grown as an ornamental. It may be trained up a tree, a wall or a pergola. It may also be trained as a half-standard tree. It is hardy down to −20 °C (−4 °F) but needs a sheltered position in sun or partial shade, and reliably moist soil.

The following cultivars have gained the Royal Horticultural Society's Award of Garden Merit:-

- It is a parent of the hybrid Wisteria × valderi 'Burford'
- 'Okayama'
- 'Showa-beni'
- Wisteria brachybotrys f. albiflora 'Shiro-kapitan'

== Gallery ==
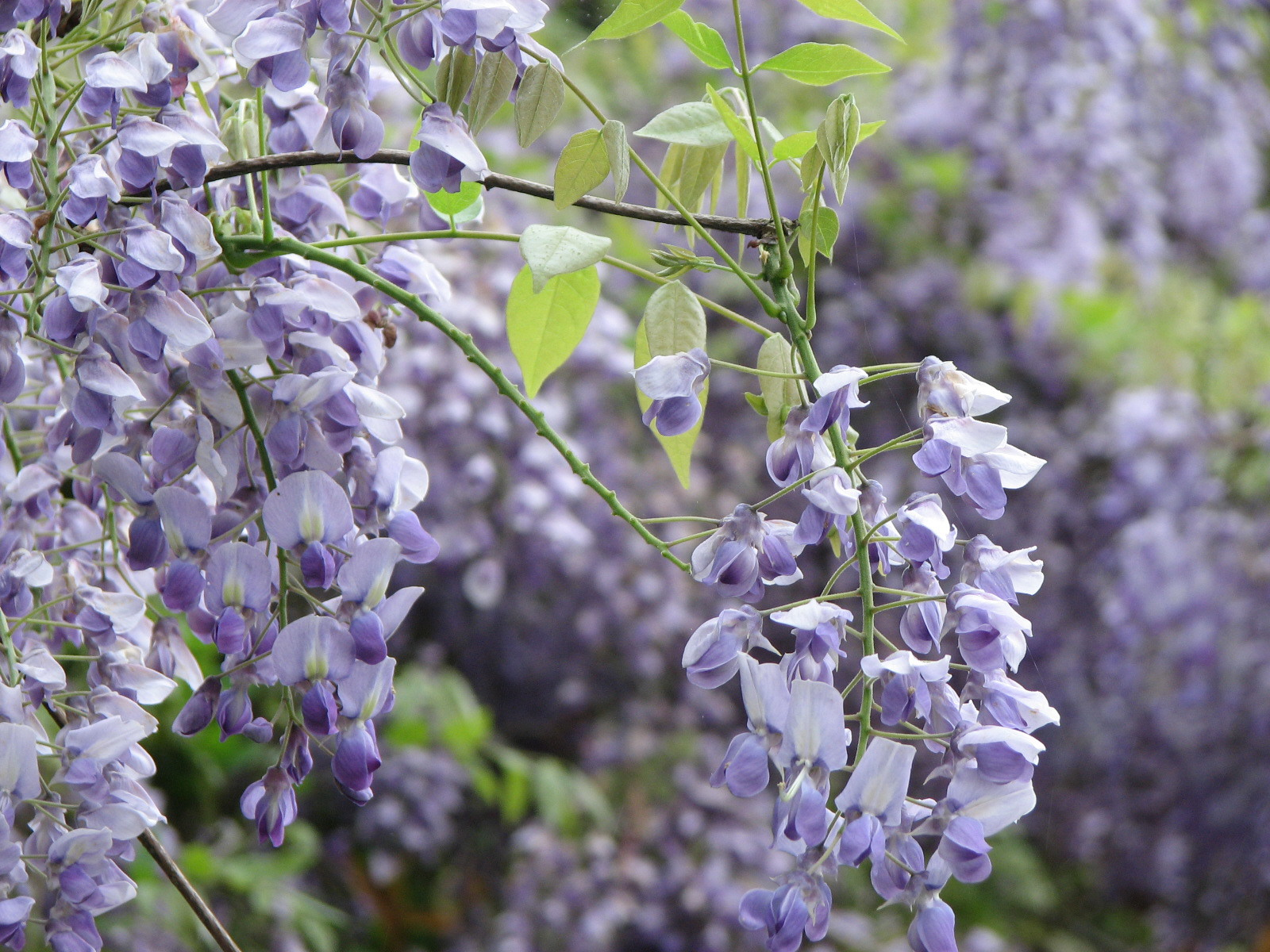

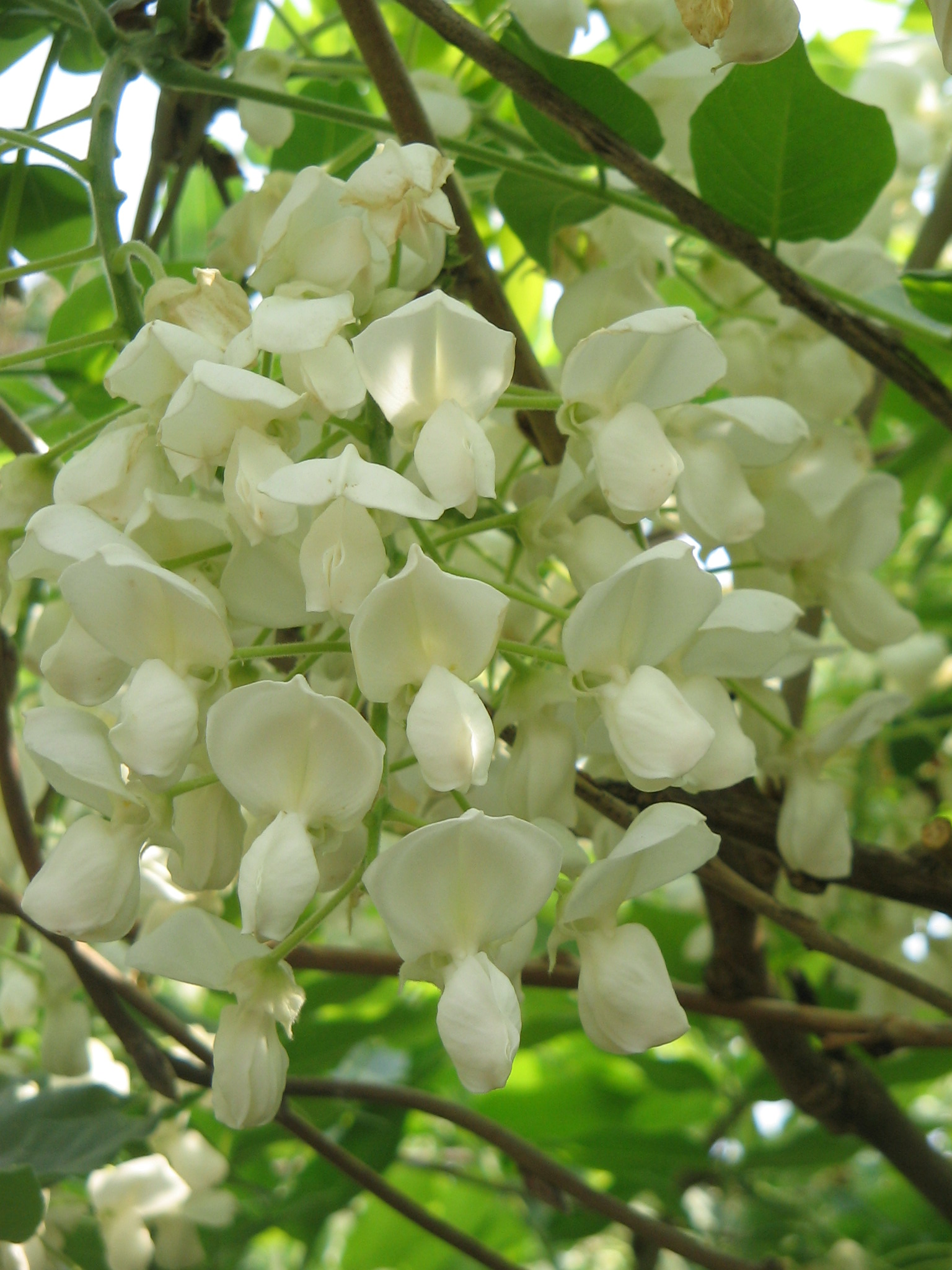

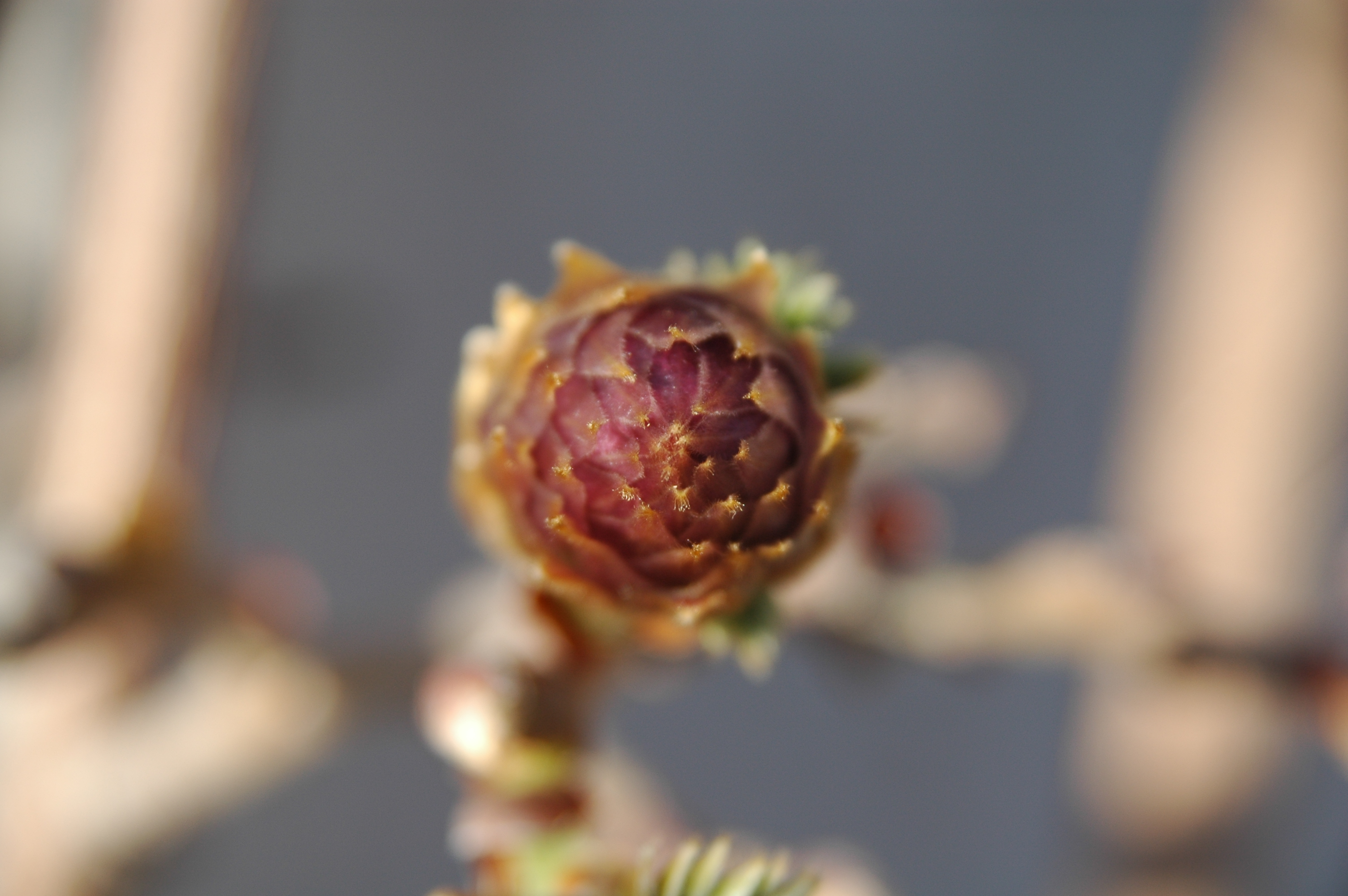
