= Wisteria × valderi =

Scientific classification
- Kingdom: Plantae
- Clade: Tracheophytes
- Clade: Angiosperms
- Clade: Eudicots
- Clade: Rosids
- Order: Fabales
- Family: Fabaceae
- Subfamily: Faboideae
- Genus: Wisteria
- Species: W. × valderi

Binomial name
- Wisteria × valderi J.Compton

Species of plant

Wisteria × valderi, called Valder's wisteria, is an artificial hybrid species of flowering plant in the family Fabaceae. Its parents are Wisteria brachybotrys (from eastern China and Japan) and Wisteria floribunda (from Japan). A deciduous liana reaching 9 m (30 ft), it has a number of cultivars, with 'Burford' having gained the Royal Horticultural Society's Award of Garden Merit.
