= Sendō Kofun =

Kofun period decorated kofun burial mound in Chikuzen, Japan

- 仙道古墳 (Japanese)
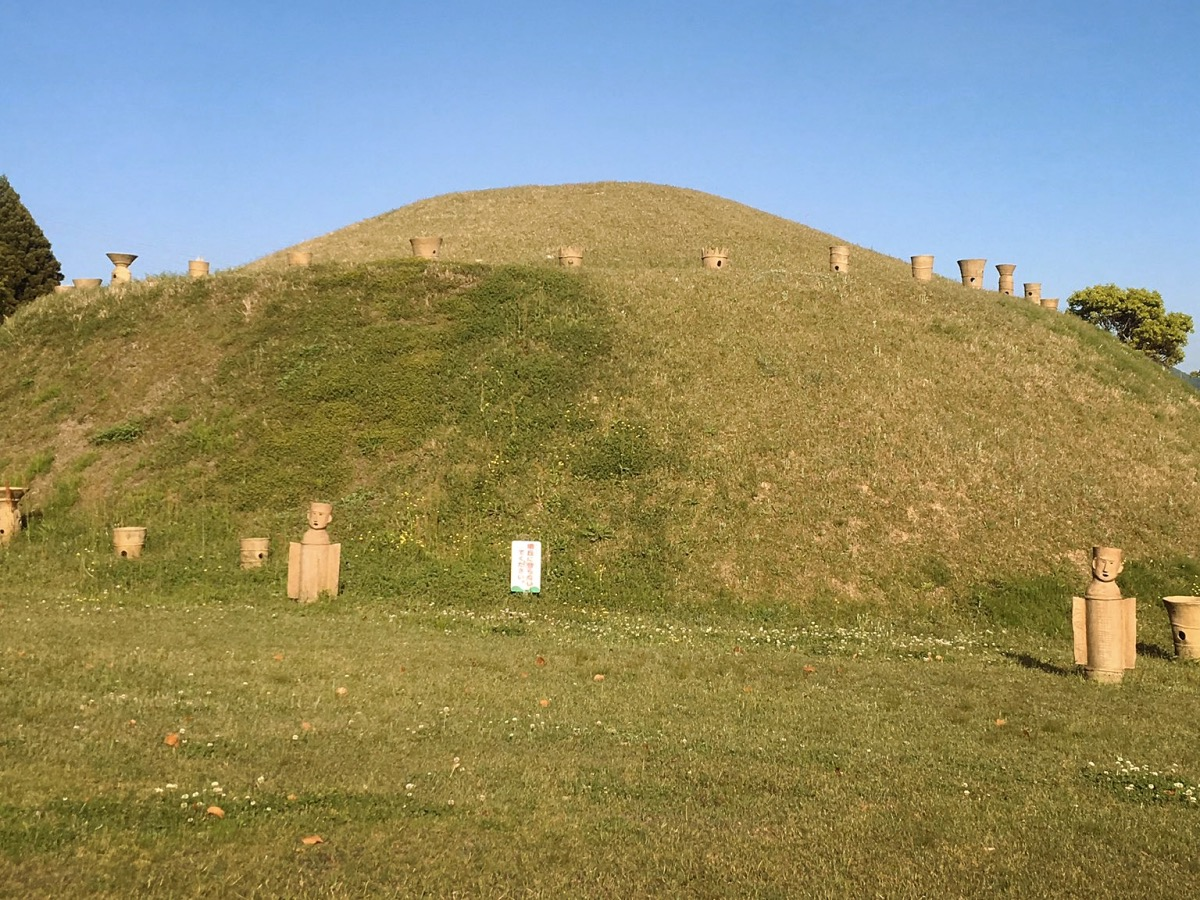
- Sendō Kofun

- Sendō Kofun Sendō Kofun (Japan)
- Interactive map of Sendō Kofun
- 33°26′27″N 130°38′25″E
- Type: Kofun
- Periods: Kofun period
- Location: Chikuzen, Fukuoka, Japan
- Region: Kyushu

History
- Built: c.6th century

Site notes
- Public access: Yes (no facilities)

The Sendō Kofun (仙道古墳) is a Kofun period Decorated kofun burial mound, located in the Hisamitsu neighborhood of the town of Chikuzen, Fukuoka Prefecture, Japan. The tumulus was designated a National Historic Site of Japan in 1978.

== Overview ==
The Sendō Kofun is located in the northern part of the Chikugo Plain, at the foot of the Amidagamine Hills, which extends south from the Asakura Mountains. Approximately 50 enpun (円墳)-style circular tumuli, in the area make up the Amidagamine Kofun Cluster, and Sendō Tumulus is the largest of these. Archaeological excavation in 1977 revealed that it was a two-tiered tumulus with fukiishi on the surface, and that it has a diameter of about 33 meters and height of four meters. It is surrounded by a double moat, two to three meters wide and about one meter deep. The horizontal-entry stone burial chamber is orientated to the southwest, and was robbed in antiquity. The burial chamber is located in the center of the mound, and is 2 to 2.4 meters wide and 3 meters long, and the floor is covered with paving stones. Decorative murals cover the entire surface of the burial chamber. The patterns are geometric, such as circles and triangles, and the colors red and green are used. The only remaining evidence of grave goods was some small fragments of jade, possibly from a bracelet. However, anthropomorphic haniwa of warriors carrying shields and horses were discovered from the outer periphery of the mound, indicating that the tomb was constructed around the 6th century. It is a unique tumulus in that decorative kofun do not normally have haniwa.

Currently, the tumulus is maintained as part of an archaeological park and the burial chamber is open to the public every spring and fall. It is located 5.3 kilometers (about 15 minutes by car) northwest of Amagi Station on the Amagi Railway Amagi Line.

== See also ==
- List of Historic Sites of Japan (Fukuoka)
- Decorated kofun
