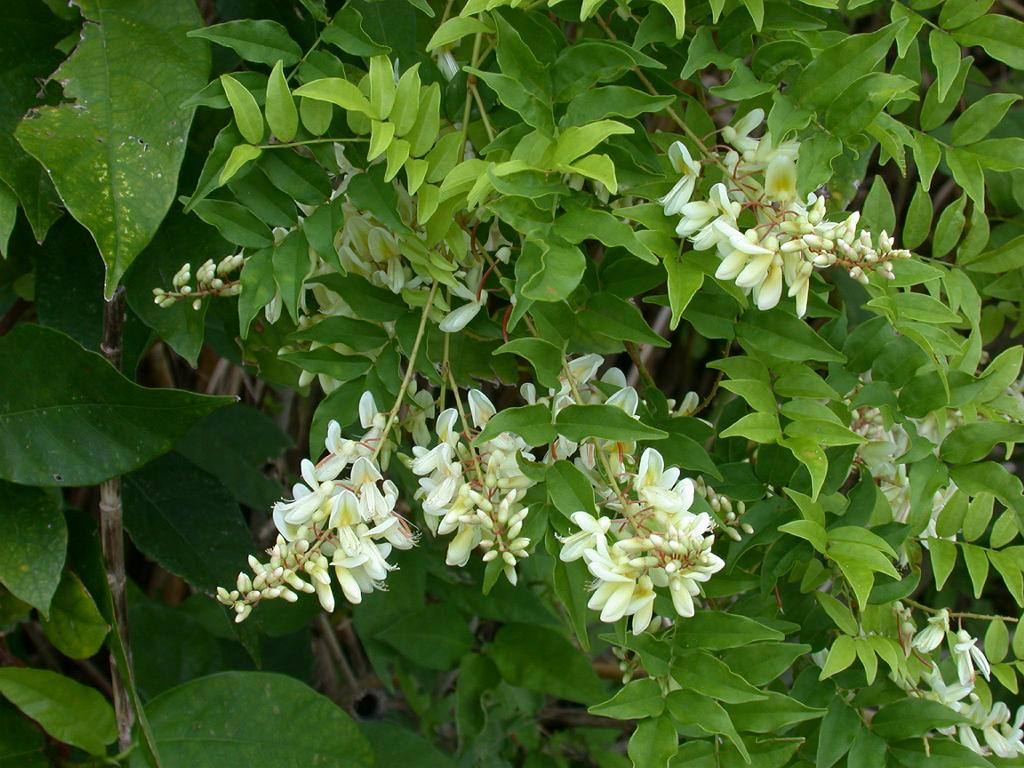
- In cultivation

Scientific classification
- Kingdom: Plantae
- Clade: Tracheophytes
- Clade: Angiosperms
- Clade: Eudicots
- Clade: Rosids
- Order: Fabales
- Family: Fabaceae
- Subfamily: Faboideae
- Genus: Wisteriopsis
- Species: W. japonica

Binomial name
- Wisteriopsis japonica (Siebold & Zucc.) J.Compton & Schrire

Synonyms
- Glycine japonica (Siebold & Zucc.) Jacob-Makoy; Kraunhia japonica (Siebold & Zucc.) Taub.; Millettia japonica (Siebold & Zucc.) A.Gray; Phaseoloides japonicum (Siebold & Zucc.) Kuntze; Wisteria japonica Siebold & Zucc.

= Wisteriopsis japonica =

Species of plant

Wisteriopsis japonica is a species of flowering plant in the family Fabaceae, native to Japan, Korea, and the Ryukyu Islands. It was first described in 1839 as Wisteria japonica. (The English name Japanese wisteria is used for a different species, Wisteria floribunda.)

== Varieties ==
Two varieties have been recognized:

- W. japonica var. alborosea – standard petal white, wing and keel petals pink
- W. japonica var. japonica – all petals similarly coloured, yellowish to greenish white

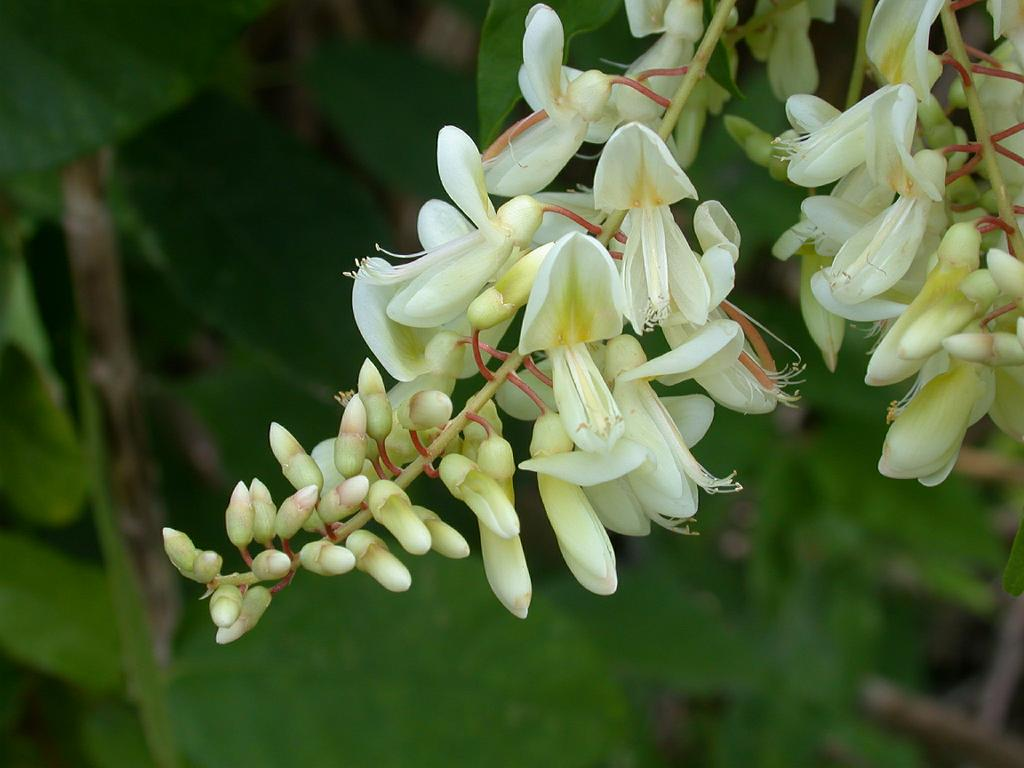
Close up of flowers
