= Asakura District, Fukuoka =

District in Fukuoka prefecture, Japan

Coordinates: 33°26′10″N 130°36′15″E

Location of Asakura District (the two yellow regions) in Fukuoka Prefecture

Asakura (朝倉郡, Asakura-gun) is a district located in Fukuoka Prefecture, Japan.

As of 2003, the district has an estimated population of 50,658 and a density of 255.01 persons per km^{2}. The total area is 198.65 km^{2}. Water wheels form one of the attractions of the district.

== Towns and villages ==
- Chikuzen
- Tōhō

== Mergers ==
- On March 22, 2005 the former towns of Miwa and Yasu merged, becoming the town of Chikuzen.
- On March 28, 2005 the former villages of Hōshuyama and Koishiwara merged, becoming the village of Tōhō.
- On March 20, 2006 the former towns of Asakura and Haki merged with the city of Amagi to form the new city of Asakura.
