= Chikuzen, Fukuoka =

Chikuzen 筑前町
- Town
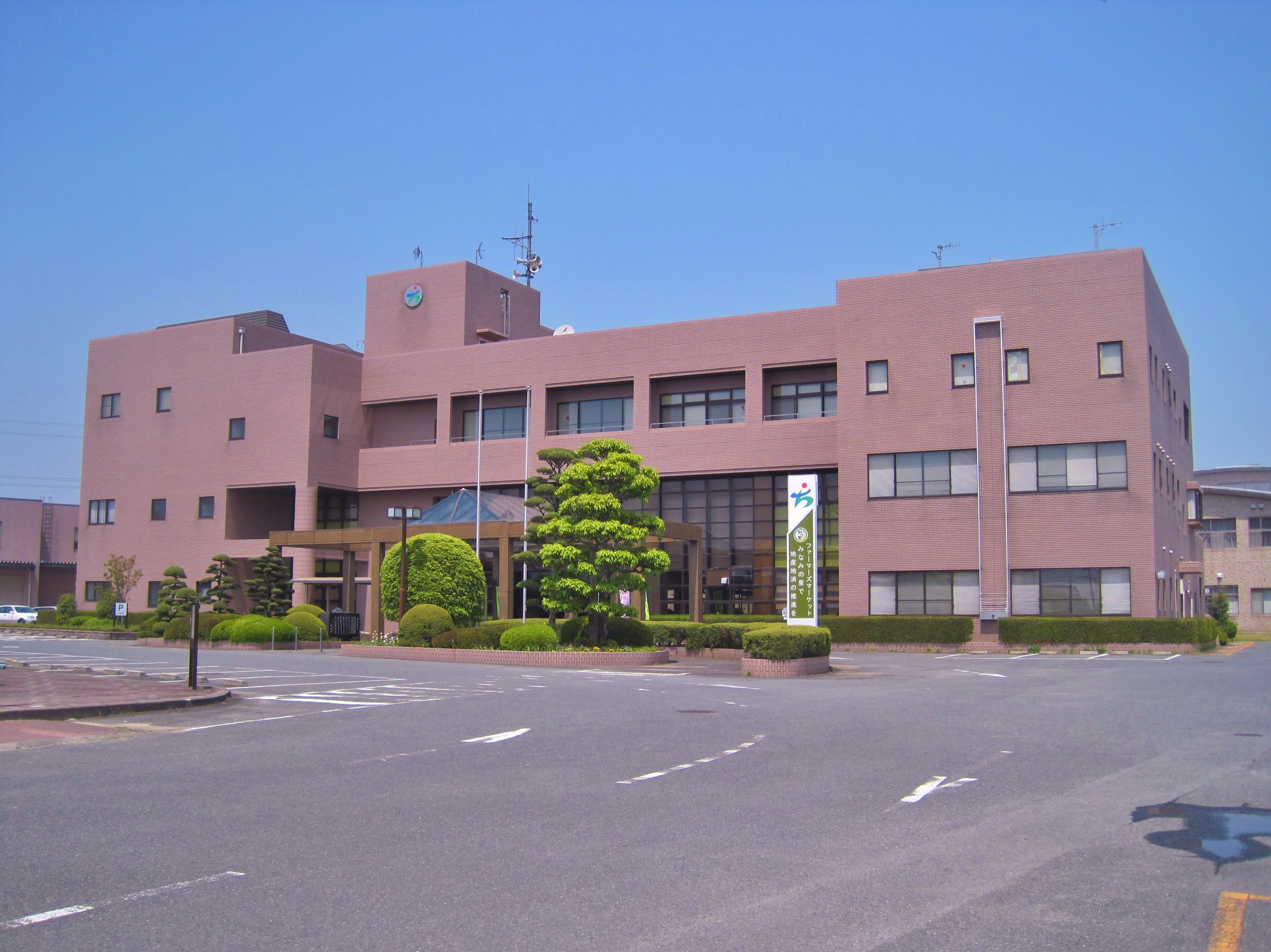
- Chikuzen Town Hall

- Flag Emblem
- Interactive map of Chikuzen
- Location in Japan
- Coordinates: 33°27′25″N 130°35′43″E
- Country: Japan
- Region: Kyushu
- Prefecture: Fukuoka
- District: Asakura

Area
  - Total: 67.10 km^{2} (25.91 sq mi)

Population (January 31, 2024)
  - Total: 30,470
  - Density: 454.1/km^{2} (1,176/sq mi)
- Time zone: UTC+09:00 (JST)
- City hall address: 373 Shinokuma, Chikuzen-cho, Asakura-gun, Fukuoka-ken 838-0298
- Website: Official website
- Symbols
- Bird: Japanese bush warbler
- Flower: Wisteria floribunda
- Tree: Sakura

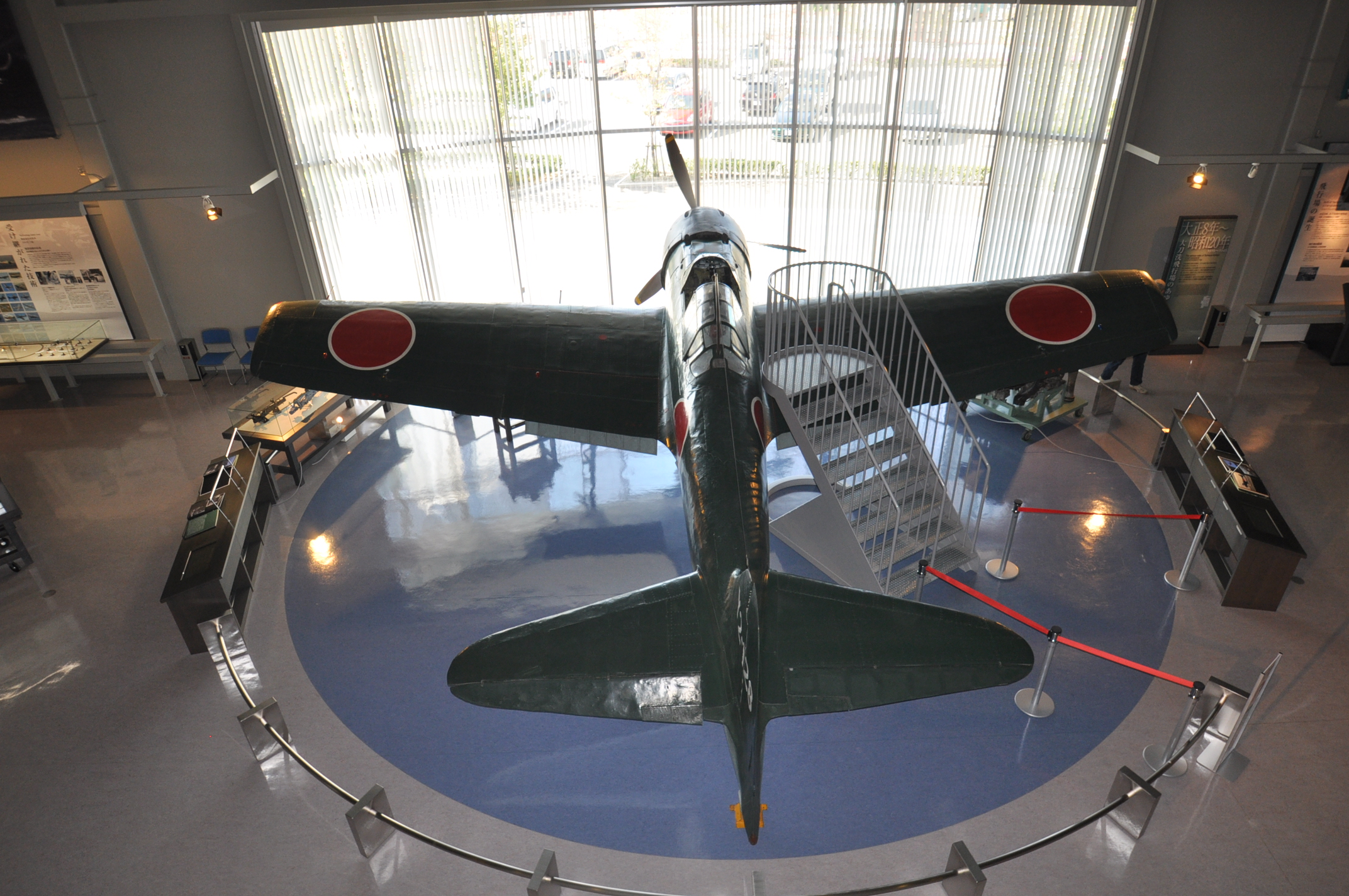
Zero fighter at Tachiarai Memorial Museum

Chikuzen (筑前町, Chikuzen-machi) is a town located in Asakura District, Fukuoka Prefecture, Japan. As of 31 January 2024, the town had an estimated population of 30,470 in 12358 households, and a population density of 450 persons per km^{2}. The total area of the town is 67.10 km^{2} (25.91 sq mi).

== Geography ==
Chikuzen is located in the central-southern part of Fukuoka Prefecture, approximately 25 kilometers southeast of Fukuoka city and approximately 20 kilometers northeast of Kurume city. The western, southwestern, and southern parts of the town are located at the northern end of the Chikugo Plain, and the terrain is relatively flat, and the main urban area is on this flat land. On the other hand, the eastern, northeastern, and northern regions are mountainous.

=== Neighboring municipalities ===
Fukuoka Prefecture

- Asakura
- Chikushino
- Iizuka
- Kama
- Ogōri
- Tachiarai

=== Climate ===
Chikuzen has a humid subtropical climate (Köppen Cfa) characterized by warm summers and cool winters with light to no snowfall. The average annual temperature in Chikuzen is 14.9 °C. The average annual rainfall is 1766 mm with September as the wettest month. The temperatures are highest on average in August, at around 26.2 °C, and lowest in January, at around 3.9 °C.

=== Demographics ===
Per Japanese census data, the population of Chikuzen is as shown below

Historical population
Year	Pop.	±%
1940	21,117	—
1950	19,384	−8.2%
1960	18,737	−3.3%
1970	22,273	+18.9%
1980	24,572	+10.3%
1990	28,926	+17.7%
2000	28,822	−0.4%
2010	29,234	+1.4%
2020	29,578	+1.2%

== History ==
The area of Chikuzen was part of ancient Chikuzen Province. Numerous burial mounds from the Kofun period are found in the area. During the Edo Period, the area was under the control of Akizuki Domain. After the Meiji restoration, the villages of Mine, Nakatsuya, Yasuno, Omiwa, and Kurita was established with the creation of the modern municipalities system on April 1, 1889. In 1908 Mine, Nakatsuya, and Yasuno villages merged to form Yasu village, and Omiwa and Kurita villages merged to form Miwa village. Both were raised to town status on April 1, 1962, and merged on March 22, 2005, to form Chikuzen town.

== Government ==
Chikuzen has a mayor-council form of government with a directly elected mayor and a unicameral town council of 14 members. Chikuzen, together with the city of Asakira and village of Tōhō contributes two members to the Fukuoka Prefectural Assembly. In terms of national politics, the city is part of the Fukuoka 5th district of the lower house of the Diet of Japan.

== Economy ==
The local economy is largely based on agriculture.

== Education ==
Chikuzen has four public elementary schools and two public junior high schools operated by the town government, and one public high school operated by the Fukuoka Prefectural Board of Education.

== Transportation ==
=== Railways ===
Amagi Railway Amagi Line

- Yamaguma - Tachiarai - Takata

=== Highways ===
- National Route 200
- National Route 386
- National Route 500

== Local attractions ==
- Sendō Kofun
- Tachiarai Peace Memorial Museum
- Yakenotōge Kofun

== Noted people from Chikuzen ==
- Fuji Yahiro, screenwriter
