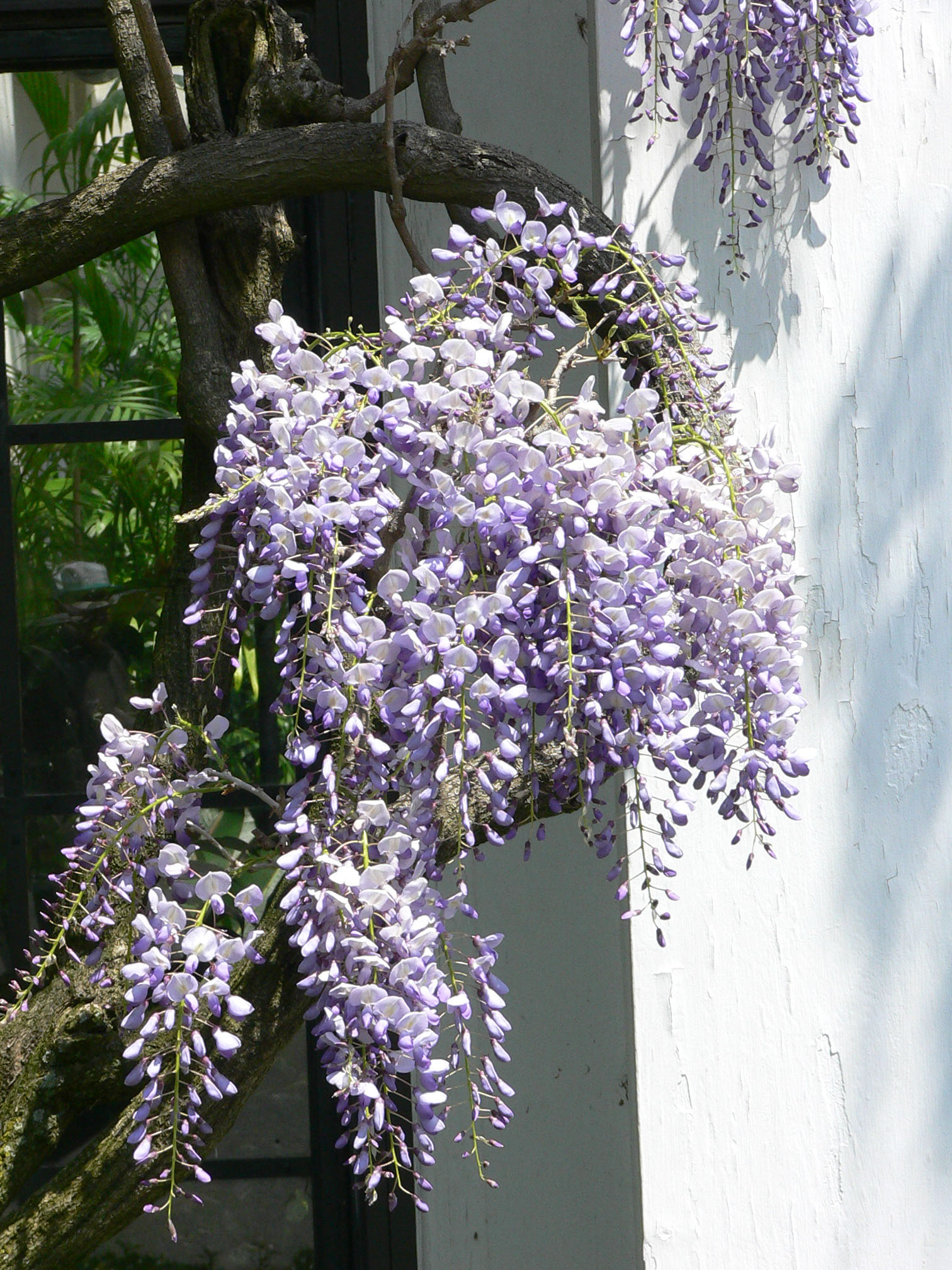
- Longwood Gardens, Pennsylvania

Scientific classification
- Kingdom: Plantae
- Clade: Tracheophytes
- Clade: Angiosperms
- Clade: Eudicots
- Clade: Rosids
- Order: Fabales
- Family: Fabaceae
- Subfamily: Faboideae
- Genus: Wisteria
- Species: W. floribunda

Binomial name
- Wisteria floribunda (Willd.) DC.

= Wisteria floribunda =

Japanese wisteria

Species of legume

Wisteria floribunda, common name Japanese wisteria (藤, fuji), is a species of flowering plant in the family Fabaceae, native to Japan. (Wisteriopsis japonica, synonym Wisteria japonica, is a different species.) Growing to 9 m (30 ft), Wisteria floribunda is a woody, deciduous twining climber. It was first brought from Japan to the United States in the 1830s. It is a common subject for bonsai, along with Wisteria sinensis (Chinese wisteria).

Japanese wisteria sports the longest flower racemes of any wisteria; Some of those cultivars can reach 2 m (7 ft) in length. These racemes burst into clustered white, pink, violet, or blue flowers in early- to mid-spring. The flowers carry a fragrance similar to that of grapes. The early flowering time of Japanese wisteria can cause problems in temperate climates, where early frosts can destroy the coming years' flowers. It will also flower only after passing from juvenile to adult stage, a transition that may take many years just like its cousin Chinese wisteria.

Japanese wisteria can grow over 30 metres (98 ft) long over many supports via powerful clockwise-twining stems. The foliage consists of shiny, dark-green, pinnately compound leaves 10–30 centimetres (3.9–11.8 in) in length. The leaves bear about 15-19 oblong leaflets that are each 2–6 centimetres (0.79–2.36 in) long. It also bears poisonous, brown, velvety, bean-like seed pods 5–10 centimetres (2.0–3.9 in) long that mature in summer and persist until winter. Japanese wisteria prefers moist soils and full sun in USDA plant hardiness zones 5–9. The plant often lives over 50 years.

== Cultivars ==
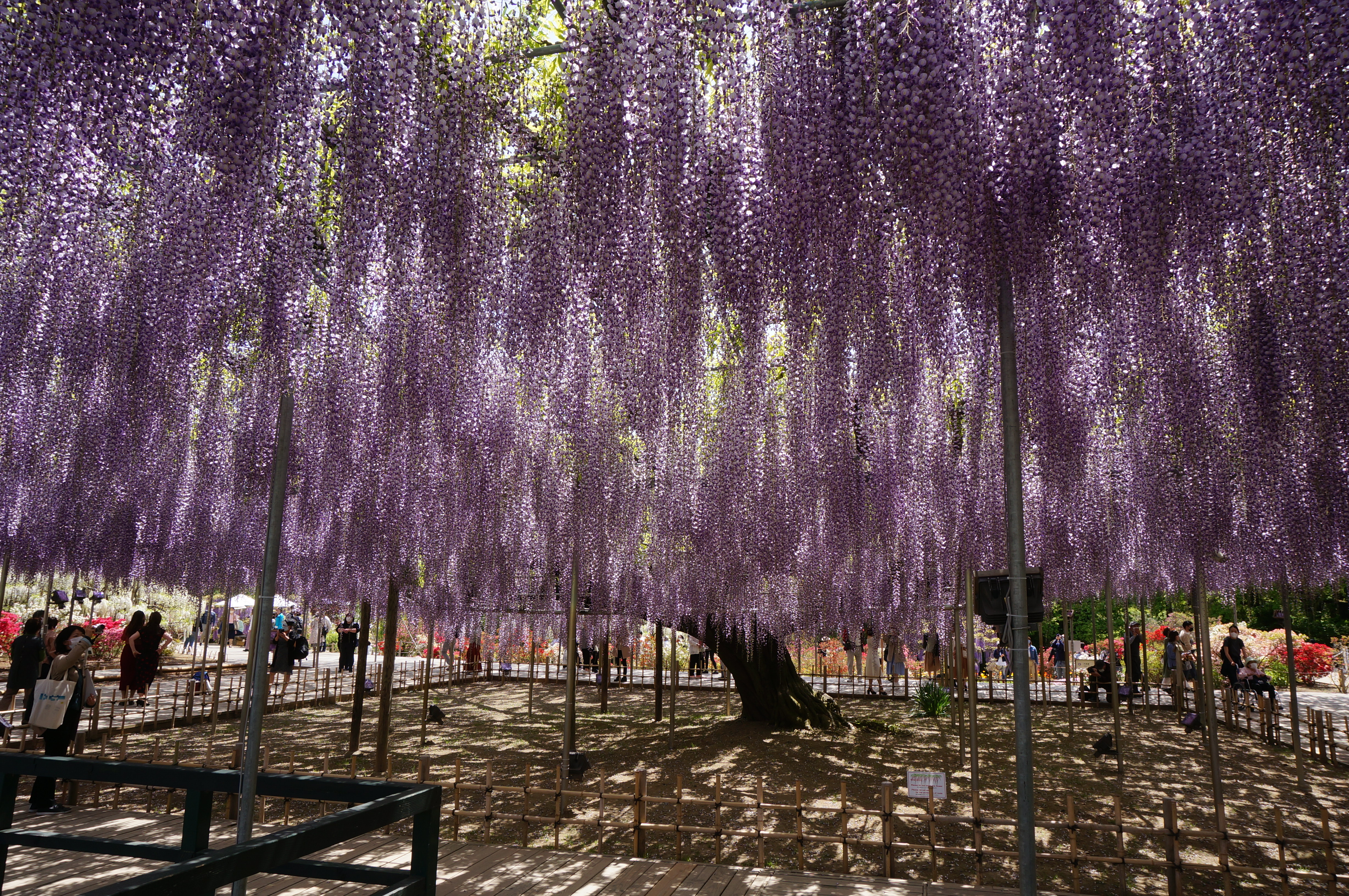
Racemes of 'kyushaku' grown to about 1.8 m (5.9 ft) to 2 m (6.6 ft) in length.

Those marked agm have gained the Royal Horticultural Society's Award of Garden Merit.

- It is a parent of the hybrid Wisteria × valderi 'Burford' agm – pale violet with purple keel
- 'Domino' agm – pale lilac
- 'Hon-beni' or 'Rosea' agm – pale rose flowers tipped purple, 18 in (46 cm) long
- 'Issai Perfect' – light lavender flowers
- 'Ito Koku Riu' or 'Royal Purple' – dark blue or violet flowers, lightly scented, long clustered bunches, 30–50 cm (12–20 in) long
- 'Jako' or 'Ivory Tower'
- 'Kimono' agm
- 'Kokuryu' agm – violet, scented
- 'Kuchibeni' or 'Carnea' – pink flower
- 'Lawrence' agm – pale violet flowers, deeper violet keel and wings
- 'Longissima Kyushaku' – mauve-purple flowers on a raceme up to 6 ft (1.8 m) or even 7 feet (2.1 m) in length. 'Kyushaku' means '9 shaku', referring to an archaic Japanese unit of measurement; in the International System of Units, 9 shaku translates to a length of 2.72 m (8.9 ft). The origin of this cultivar is a 1200 year-old wisteria tree in Ushijima, Kasukabe City, which had racemes about 3 m (9.8 ft) long in the Meiji period. Also known as 'Murasaki naga fuji' or Noda naga fuji.
- 'Macrobotrys' or 'Longissima' – reddish-violet flower clusters 1 m (3.3 ft) or longer
- 'Macrobotrys Cascade' – white and pinkish-purple flowers, vigorous grower
- 'Nana Richins Purple' – purple flowers
- 'Nishiki' – variegated foliage
- 'Plena' or 'Violaceae Plena' – double blue flowers in dense clusters
- 'Praecox' or 'Domino' – purple flowers
- 'Purpurea' – unknown; may be Wisteria sinensis 'Consequa', sometimes labeled purpurea
- 'Rubra' – unknown; may be 'Honbeni' – sometimes labeled as Rubrum – deep pink to red flowers
- 'Shiro-noda' (W. floribunda f' alba) agm – long white flower clusters
- 'Texas Purple' – may be a sinensis or a hybrid, short racemes, purple flowers, produced while the plant is still young
- 'Violacea Plena' – double violet flowers, rosette-shaped
- 'White with Blue Eye' – also known as 'Sekines Blue' – very fragrant
- 'Yae-kokuryu' agm

== Gallery ==
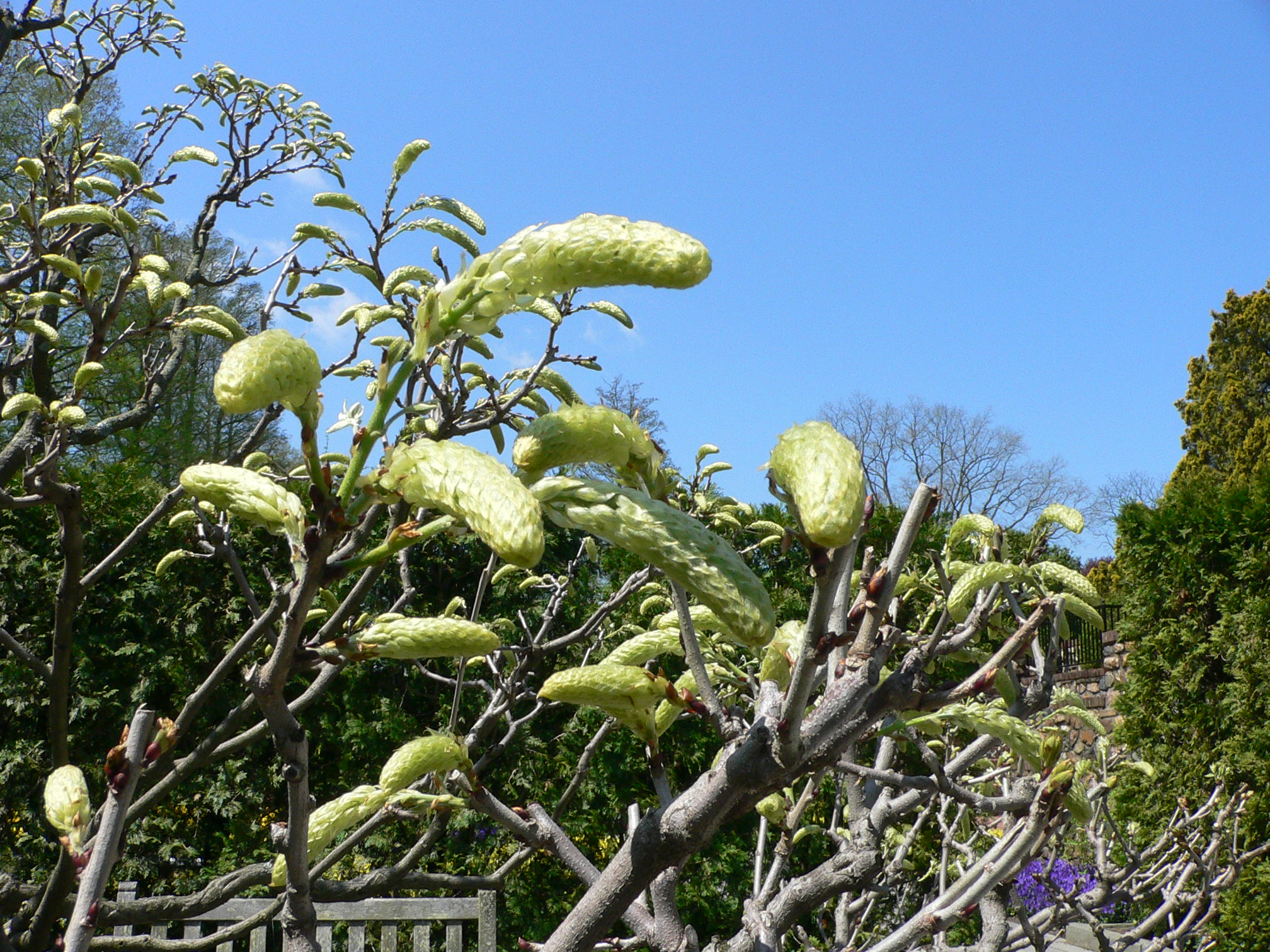
Racemes with flower buds

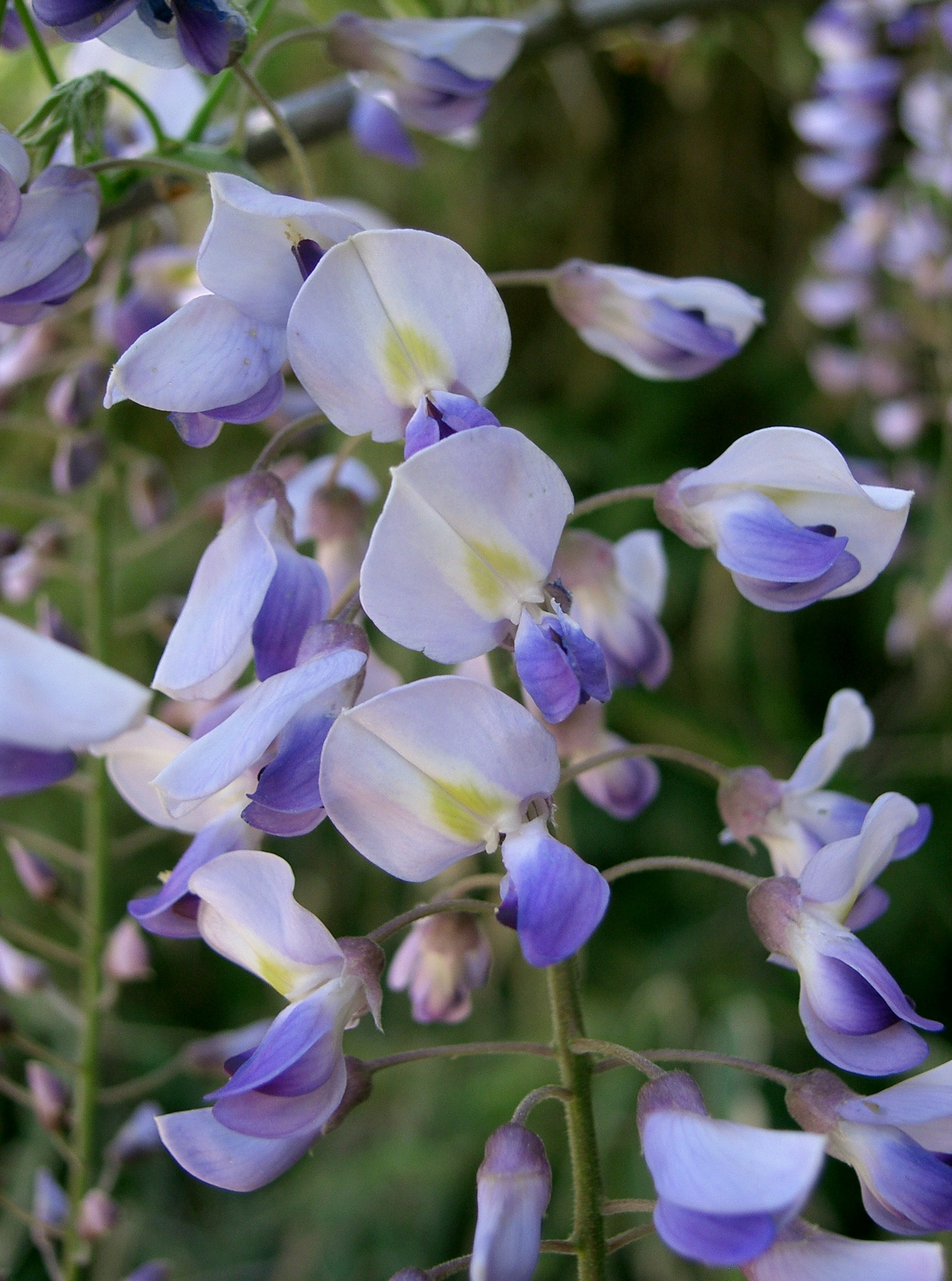
Flowers

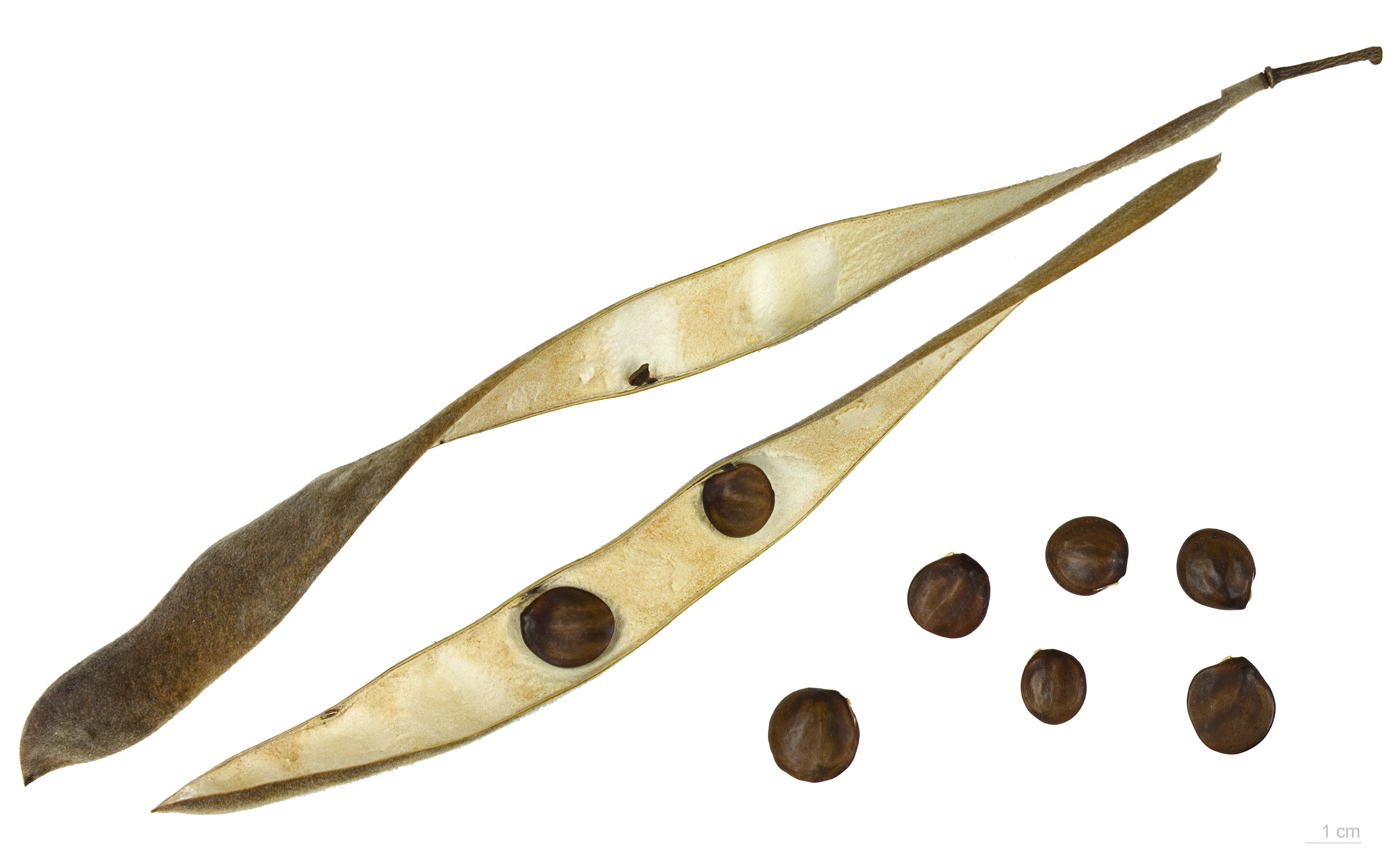
Seeds

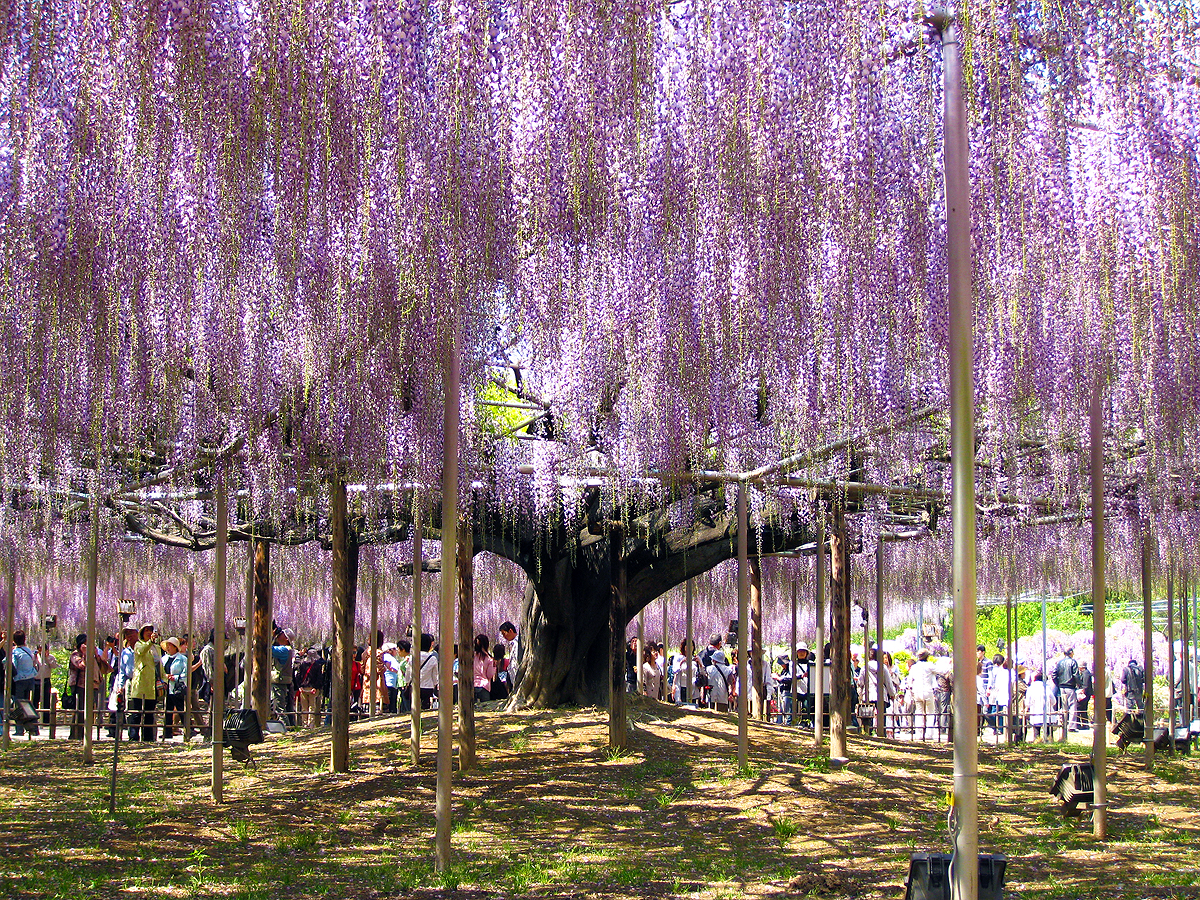
A great wisteria tree (藤, fuji) blossoms at Ashikaga Flower Park in Ashikaga, Tochigi, Japan. The largest wisteria in Japan, it is dated to 1870 and covered approximately 1,990 square metres (21,400 sq ft) as of May 2008.

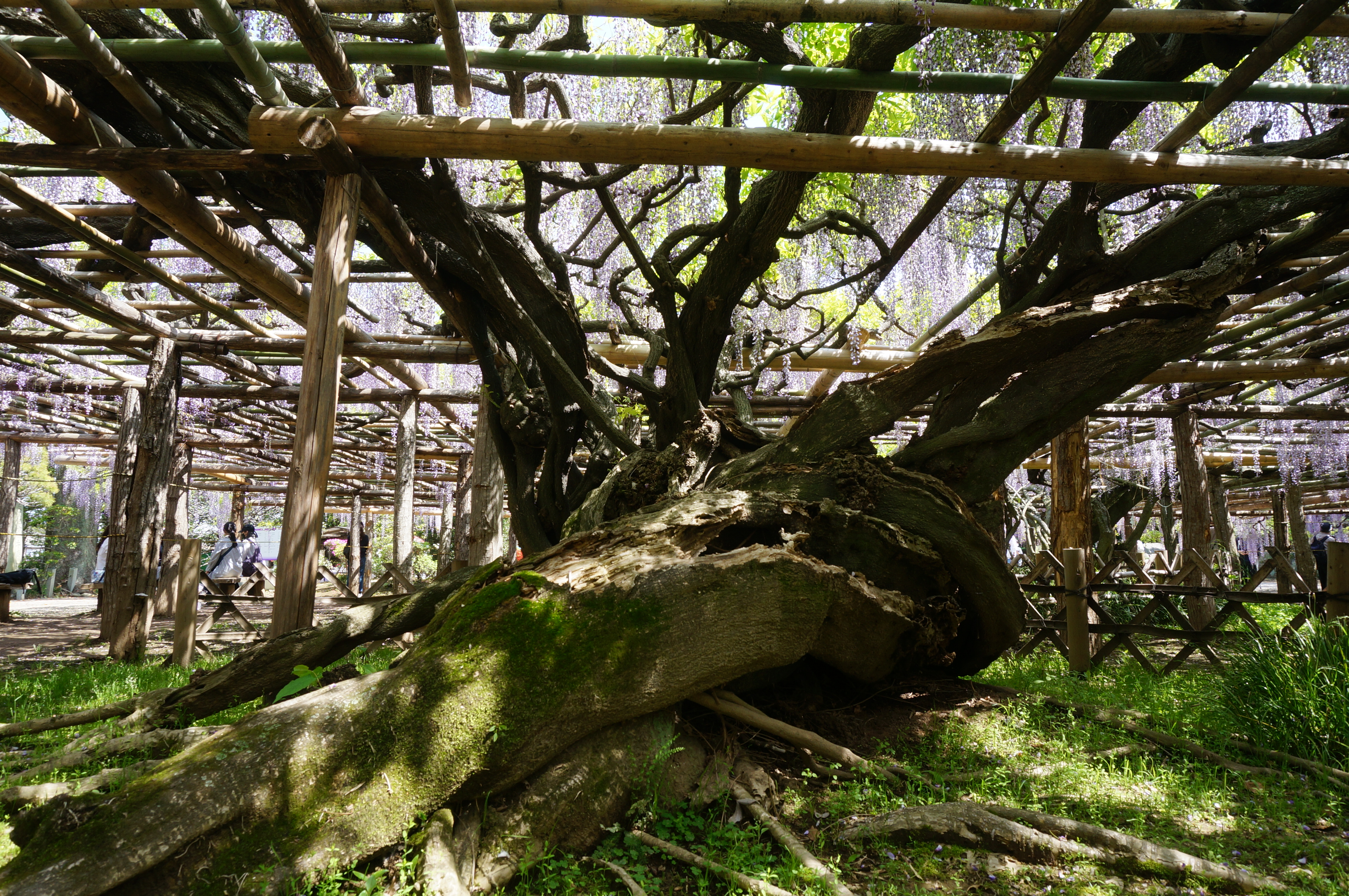
Ushijima-no-fuji, a 1,200-year-old tree designated as a special natural monument by the Japanese government. The original tree of the cultivar 'Longissima Kyushaku'. Kasukabe, Saitama, Japan.

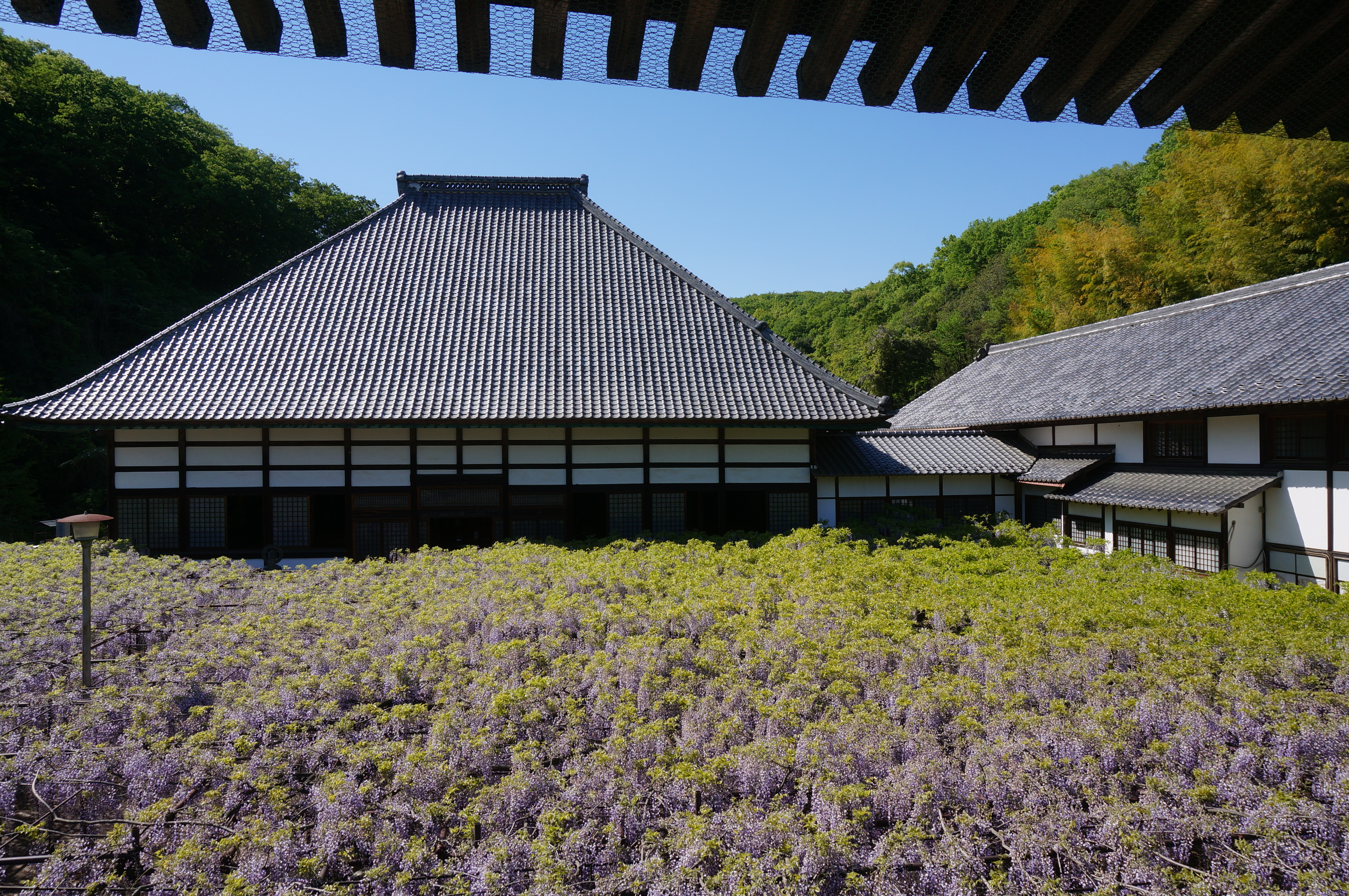
Kotsuhata-no-fuji, a 650-year-old tree designated as a natural monument by Saitama Prefecture. Honjō, Saitama, Japan.

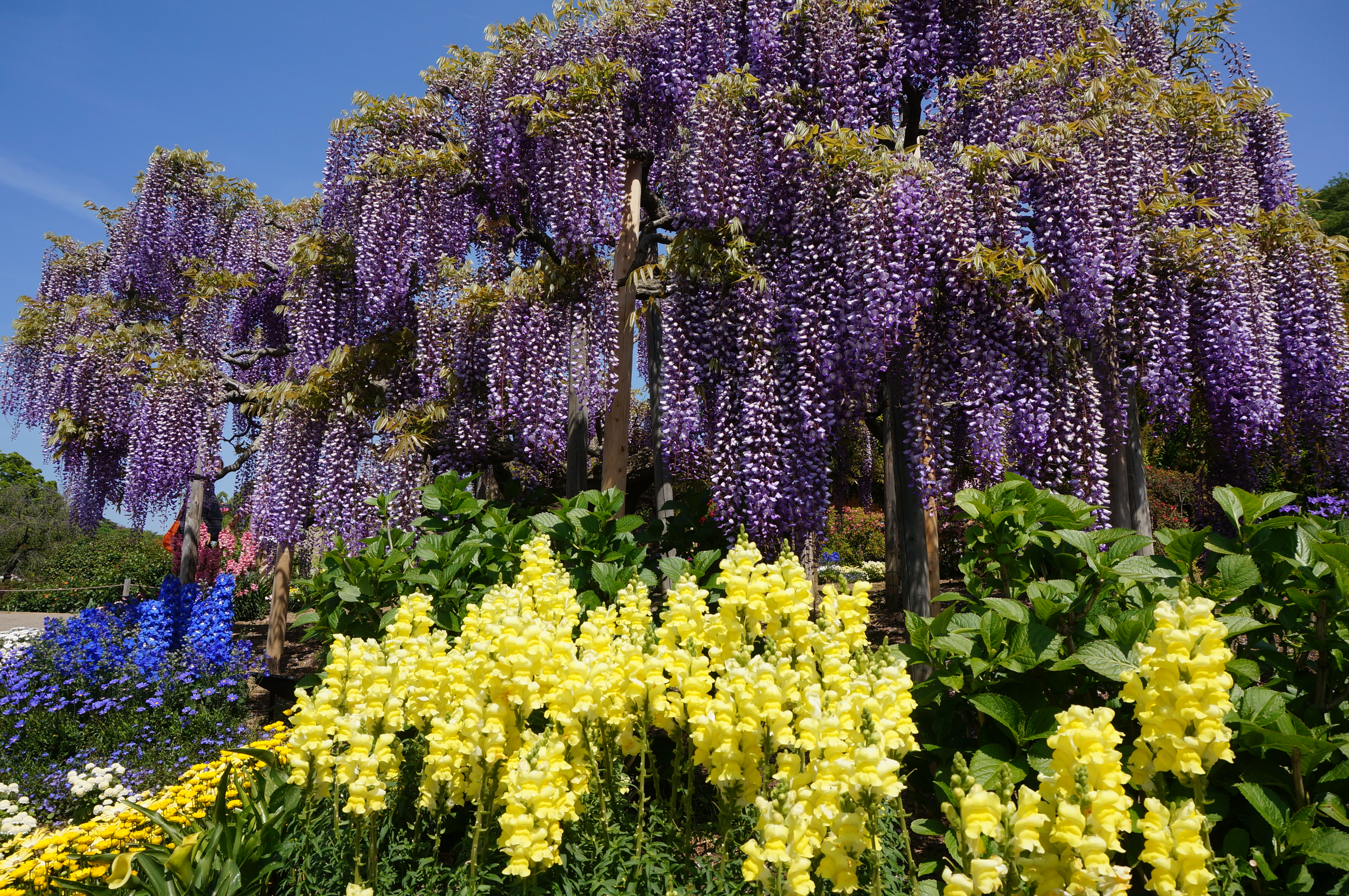
Purple wisteria at Ashikaga Flower Park

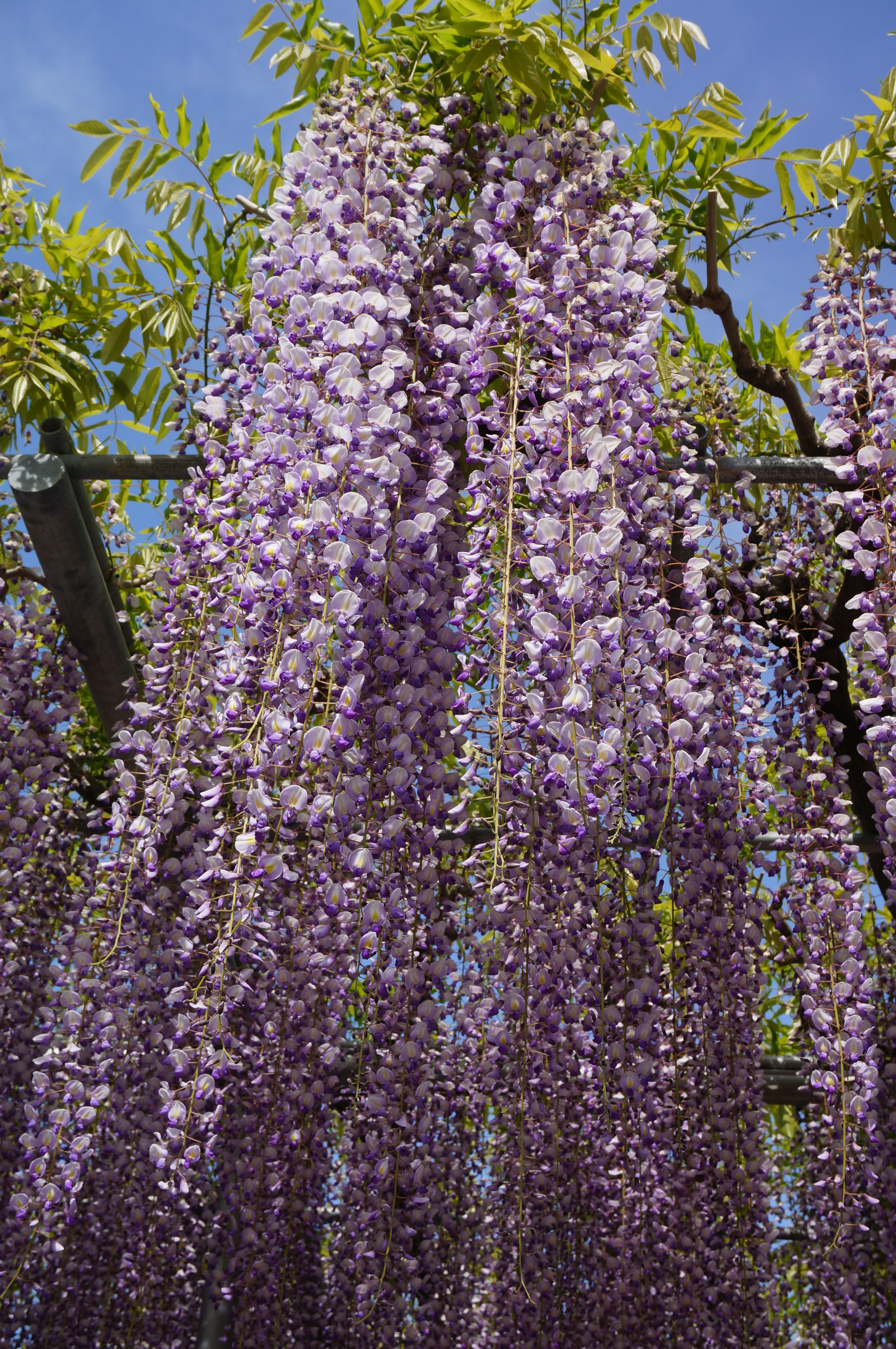
Purple wisteria at Ashikaga Flower Park

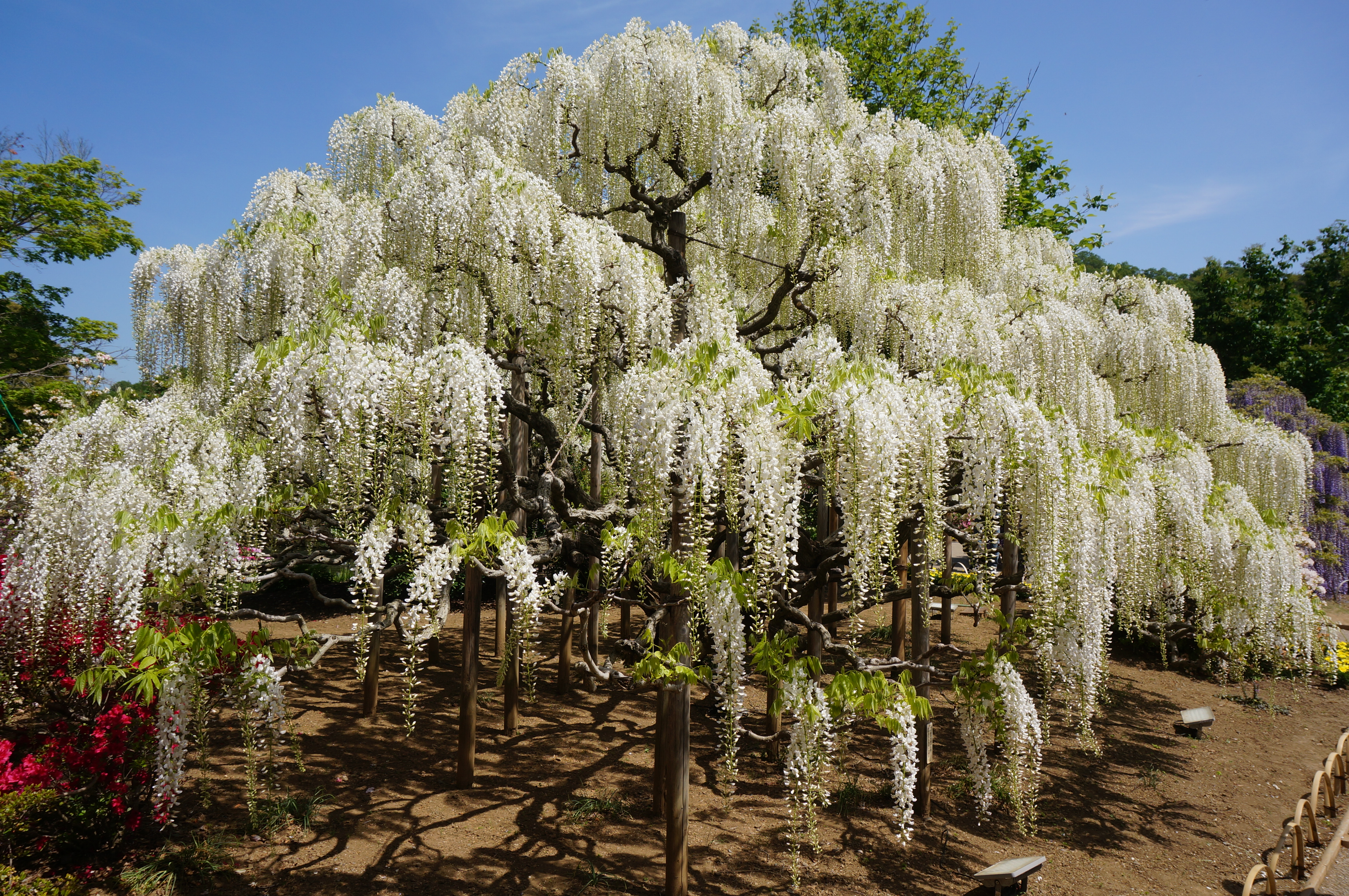
White wisteria at Ashikaga Flower Park

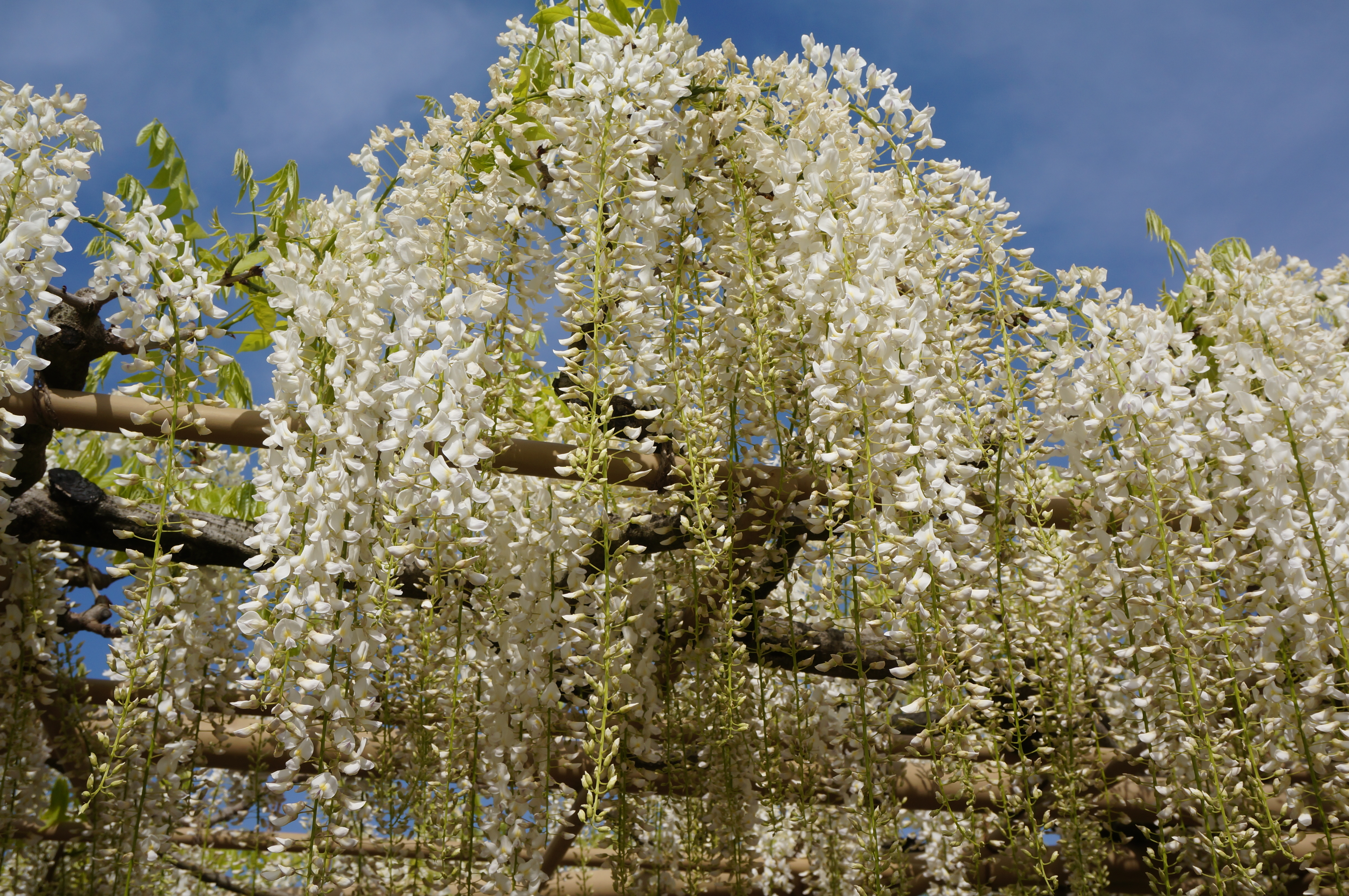
White wisteria at Ashikaga Flower Park

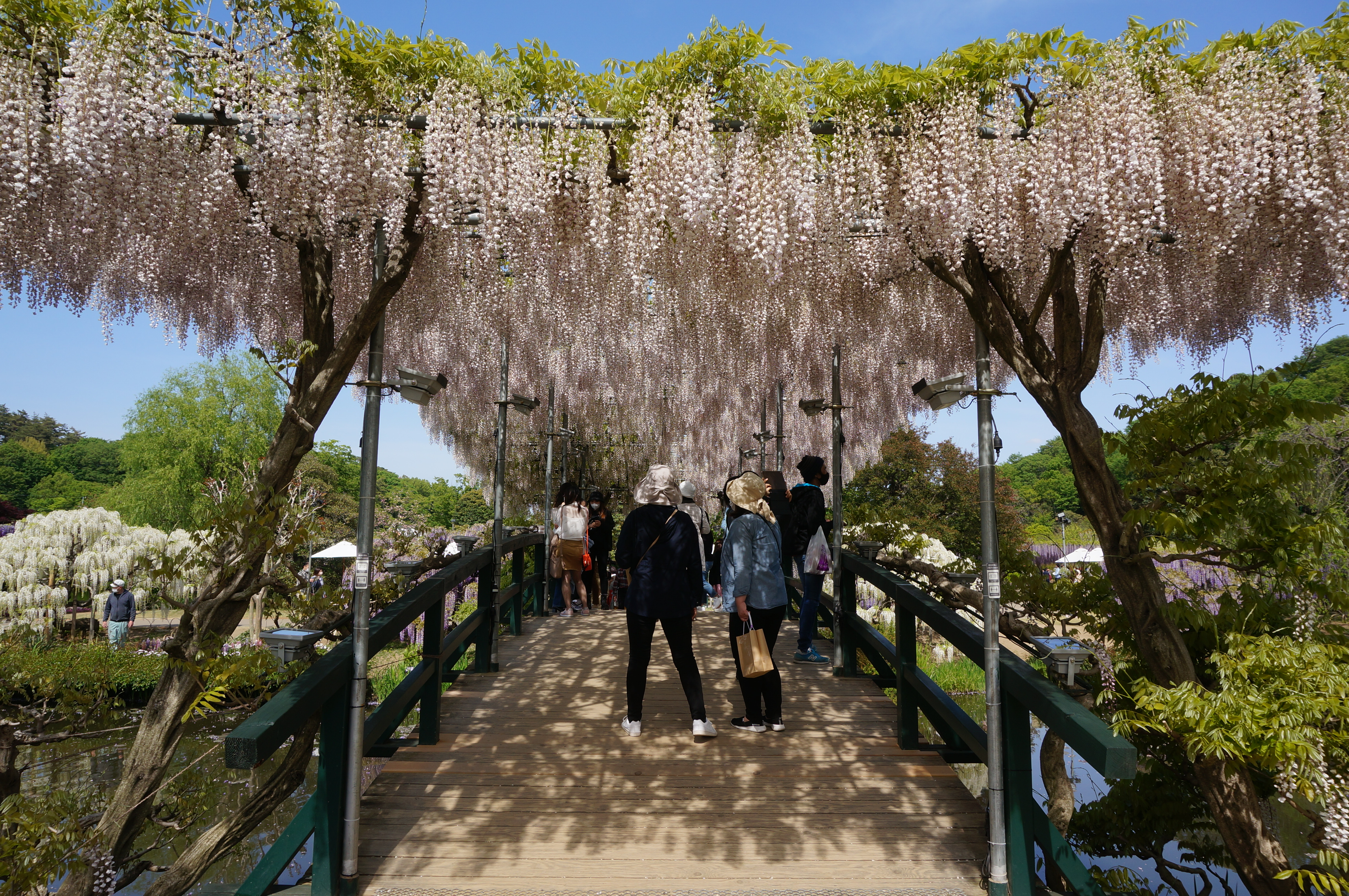
Bridge of light pink wisteria at Ashikaga Flower Park

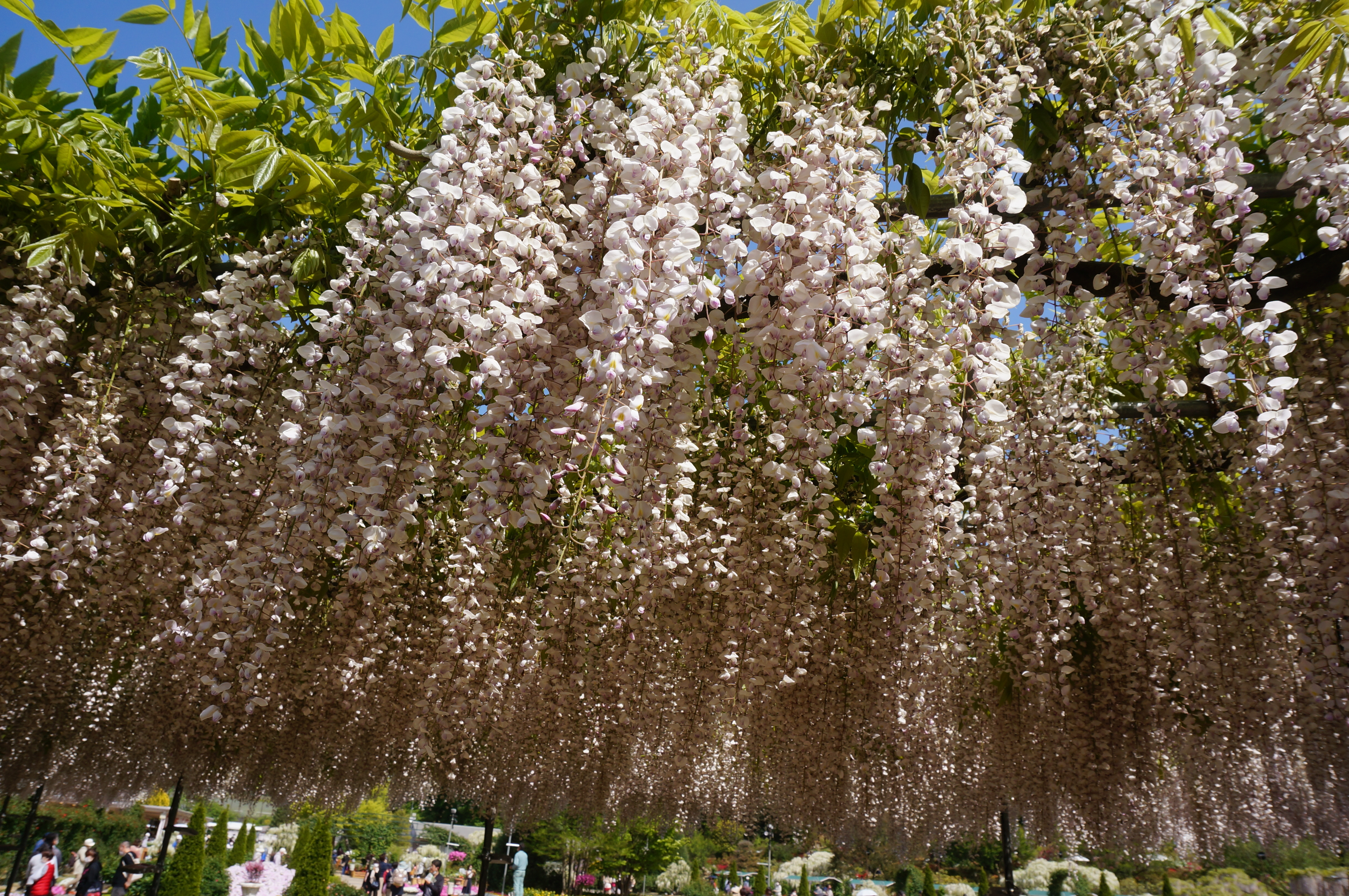
Light pink wisteria at Ashikaga Flower Park

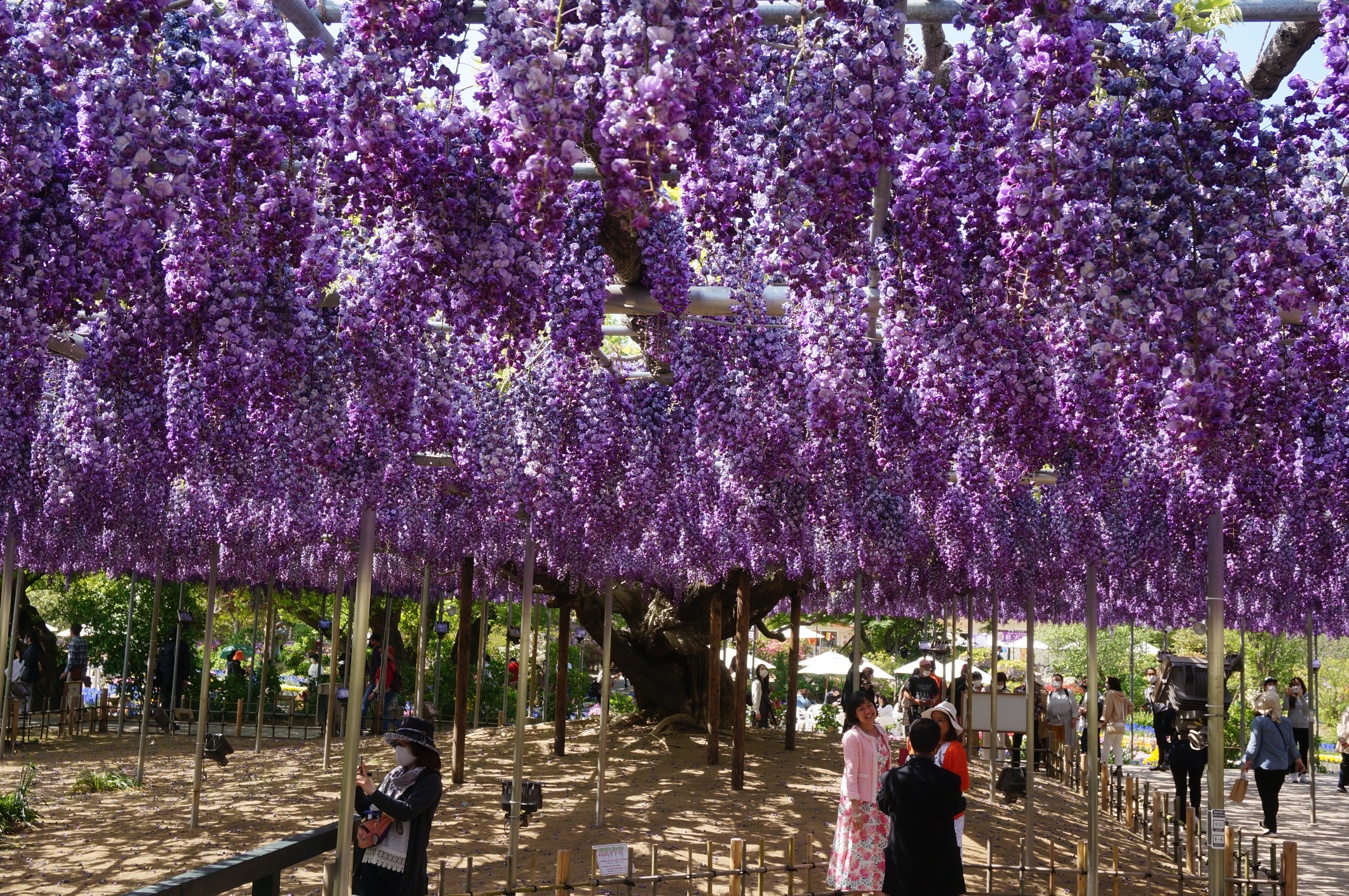
Double flowered wisteria 'Yae-kokuryu' at Ashikaga Flower Park
