= Monorack =

Monorack is the name of either of two monorails running on rack railways. Both systems are used for light loads in steep environments.

- Monorackbahn systems by Doppelmayr, used mainly in Switzerland, Germany and Italy, with an edge size of 6 centimeters (2.4 in)
- Slope car railways by Kaho Manufacturing, used mainly in Japan and South Korea, with an edge size of 4 centimeters (1.6 in)
