= Hiko =

Hiko may refer to:

- Hiko, Nevada
- the male or gender neutral version of Hime
- Hiko (juggling), juggling in Tongan dance, see Ula (dance)
- Hikosan Jingū, a shrine in Kyushu, Japan
- Mount Hiko, a mountain in Kyushu, Japan
