= Mount Hōman =

Mountain in Fukuoka Prefecture, Japan

Coordinates: 33°32′22.9″N 130°34′8.4″E

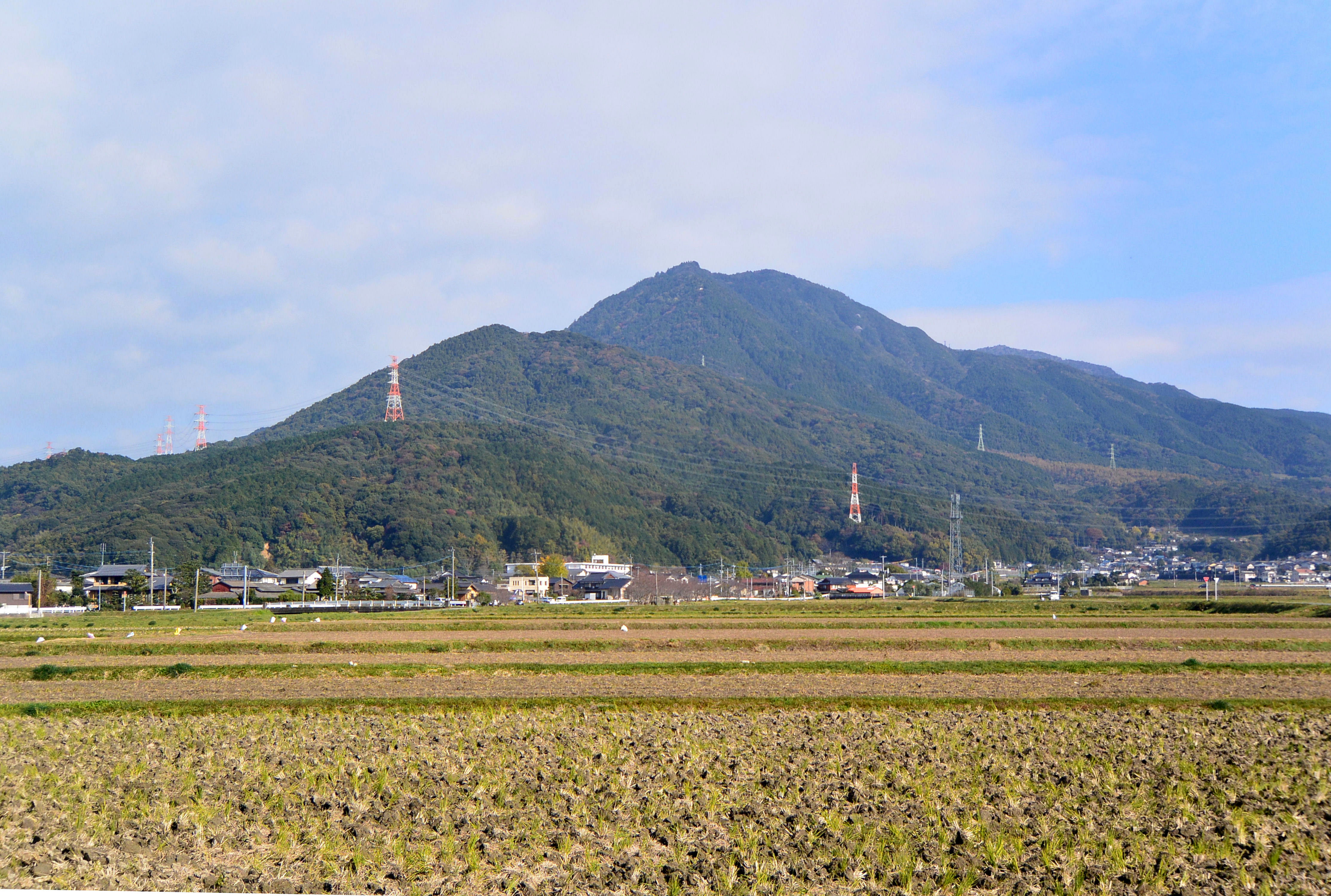
- A view of Mount Hōman from the south

Highest point
- Elevation: 829.6 m (2,722 ft)

Naming
- Native name: 宝満山 (Japanese)

Geography
- Location within Fukuoka Prefecture Location within Japan
- Country: Japan
- State: Fukuoka Prefecture
- Region: Kyushu

Climbing
- Easiest route: Hiking
- National Historic Site of Japan

Mount Hōman (宝満山, Hōman-san) is a mountain on the border between the cities of Chikushino and Dazaifu in Fukuoka Prefecture in Kyūshū, Japan. It has an elevation of 829.6 metres (2,722 ft) meters. It is regarded as a sacred mountain and one of the three major centers for Shugendō. It was designated a National Historic Site in 2013. The mountain is also called Mount Mikasa (御笠山) and Mount Kamado (竈門山)

== Overview ==
Mount Hōman is located in the center of the former Mikasa District of Chikuzen Province, southeast of Fukuoka city, northeast of Dazaifu city, and northeast of Chikushino city. The mountain is entirely made of granite. A Shinto shrine, the Kamado Shrine, is located on a gigantic rock at the summit. The view from the top of the mountain is outstanding, and from the west are the mountains of the Sefuri Mountains, Hakata Bay, Genkai Sea, Mount Kujū, the three plains of Fukuoka, Chikugo, and Saga, and Mount Unzen in the distance over the Ariake Sea, and the road along the ridge that leads to Mount Butcho and Mount Sankori is a popular hiking course.

The mountain has a history closely related to Dazaifu since ancient times and is mentioned in the Nihon Shoki as the guardian of the land of Tsukushi. Because of the syncretization of Shinto and Buddhism, the deity enshrined on this mountain was named "Hōman Daibodhisattva", and as the mountain was located to the "unlucky" northeast direction from the government offices at Dazaifu, it functioned similarly to Mount Hiei at Heian-kyō.

The temple buildings no longer exist at the 8th station, but the ruins of the middle shrine do exist. In 803, Saichō carved a statue of Yakushi Nyorai of the Kamadozan-ji in order to pray for safety during his crossing to Tang China. In 840, Kamado Shrine was given the court rank of Junior Fifth Rank per the Shoku Nihon Koki, and was listed as a Myōjin Taisha in the Engishiki. The shrine and temple became subsidiaries of Enryaku-ji in the mid Heian period, and under the practices of Shugendō, corresponded to the Diamond Realm, whereas Mount Hiko corresponded to the Womb Realm in the Mandala of the Two Realms. The mountain was fortified in the Nanboku-chō period, and the temple razed by the forces of Ōtomo Sōrin in the Sengoku period. It was gradually rebuilt on a smaller scale in the Edo period, but was reduced to a small shrine after the early Meiji period Haibutsu kishaku movement. Archaeological excavations and topographical surveys have been conducted since in 2005, with an aim of preserving any ruins which have been endangered by heavy rains in recent years. Numerous ritual objects and other artifacts, including Sancai pottery and coins from the Nara period as well as the foundation stones for structures from the Heian through Kamakura period have been found.

== Gallery ==
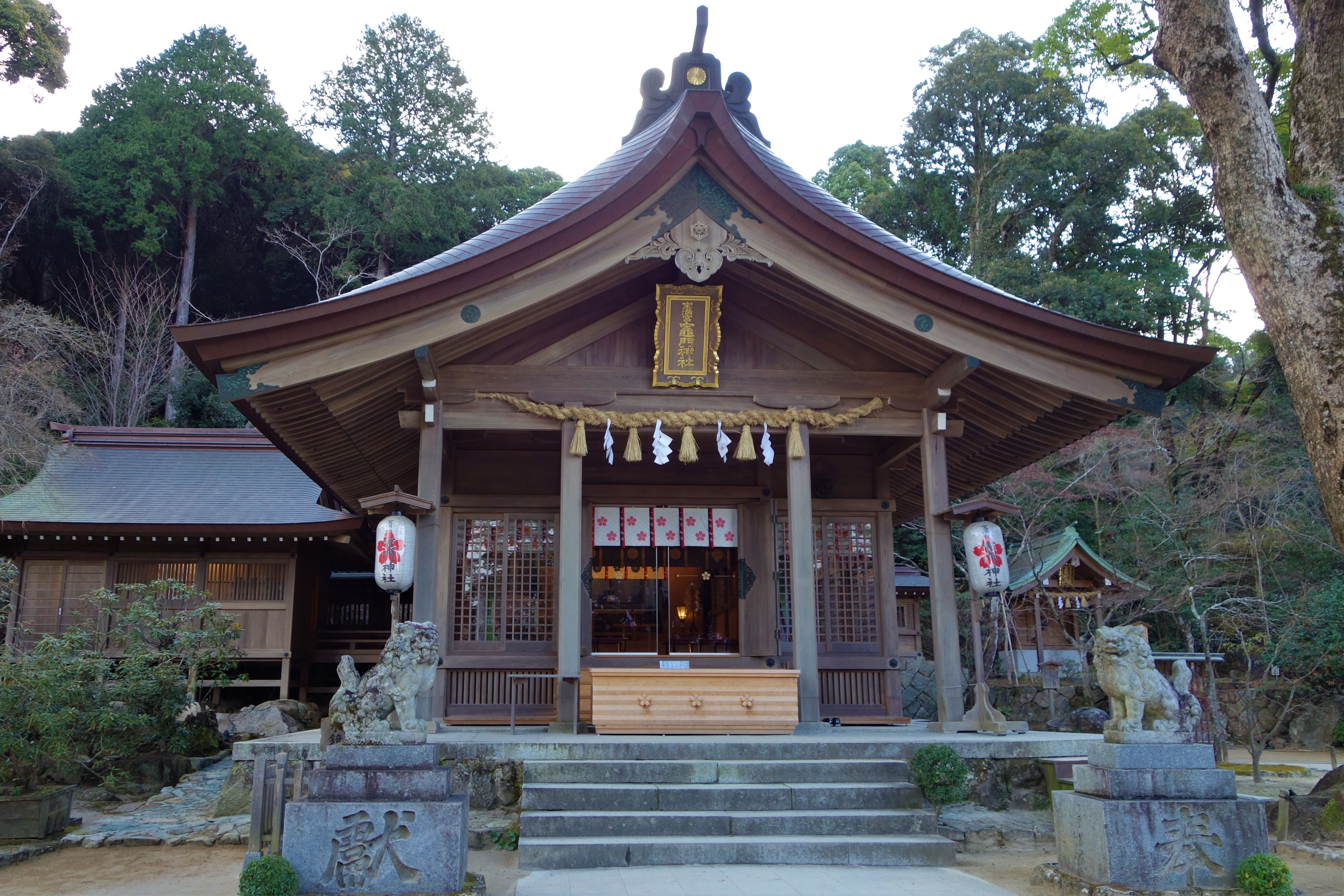
Kamado Shrine（lower shrine）

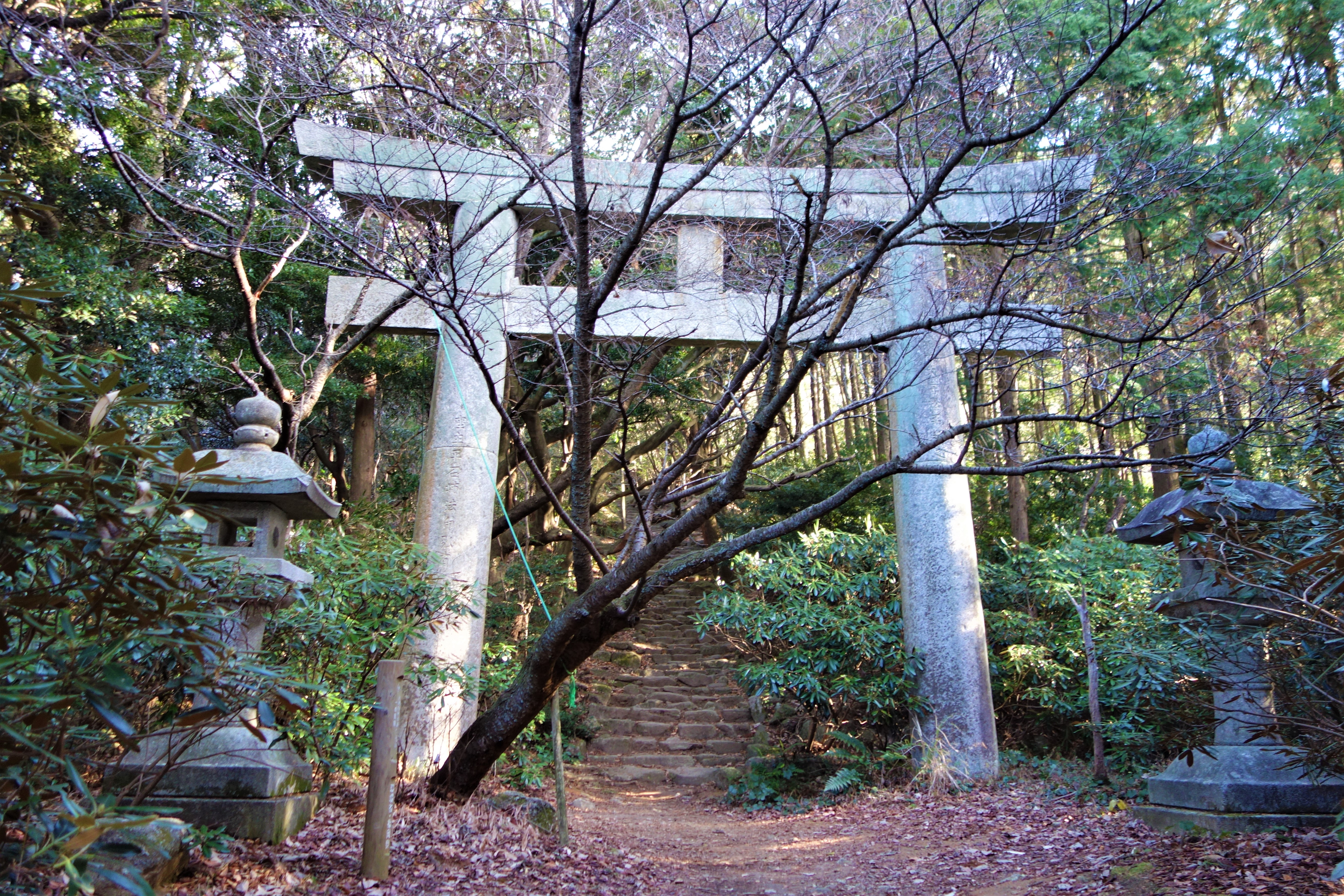
Ichi-no-torii

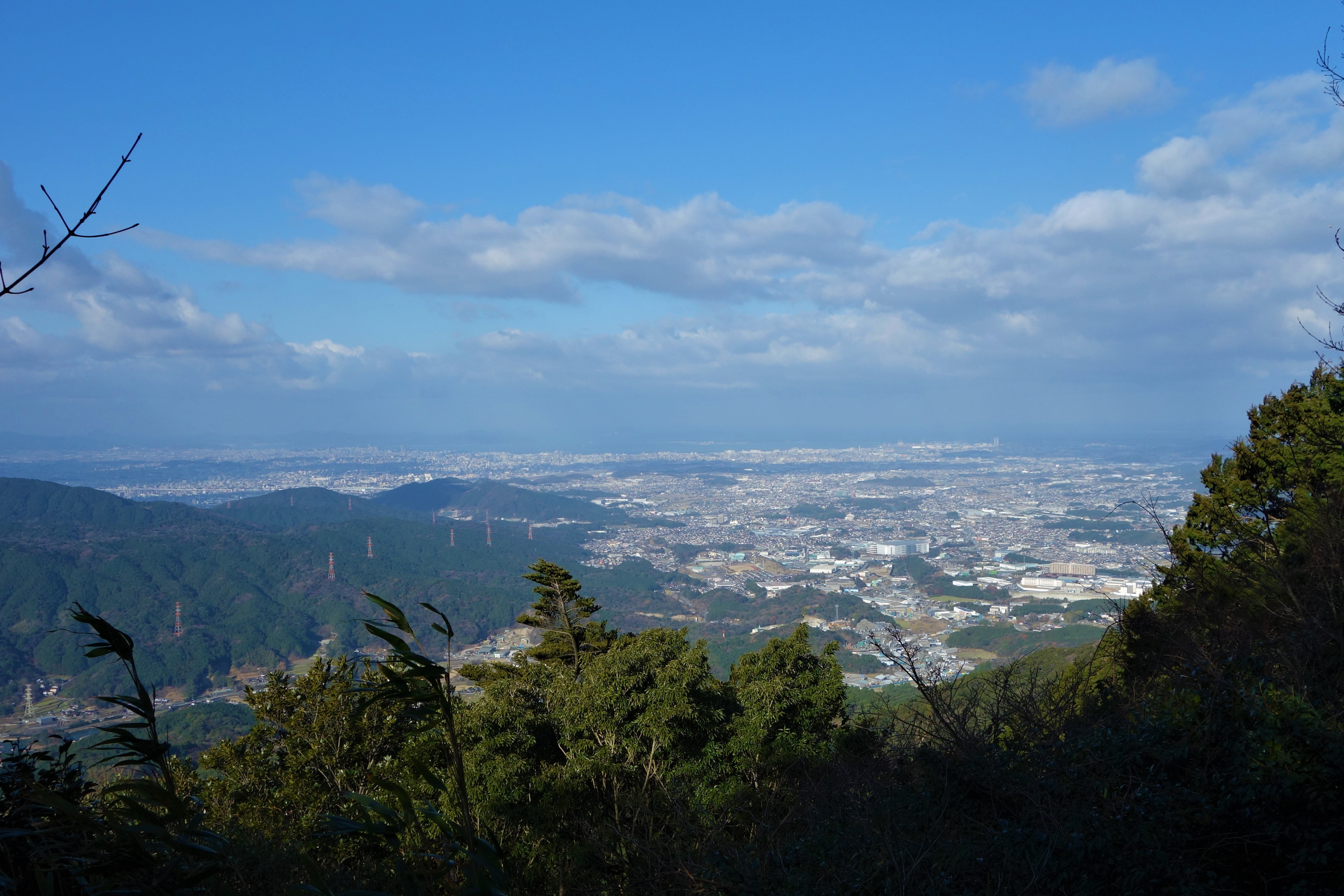
Ono Castle ruins and Fukuoka city from the front mountain trail of Mt. Homan

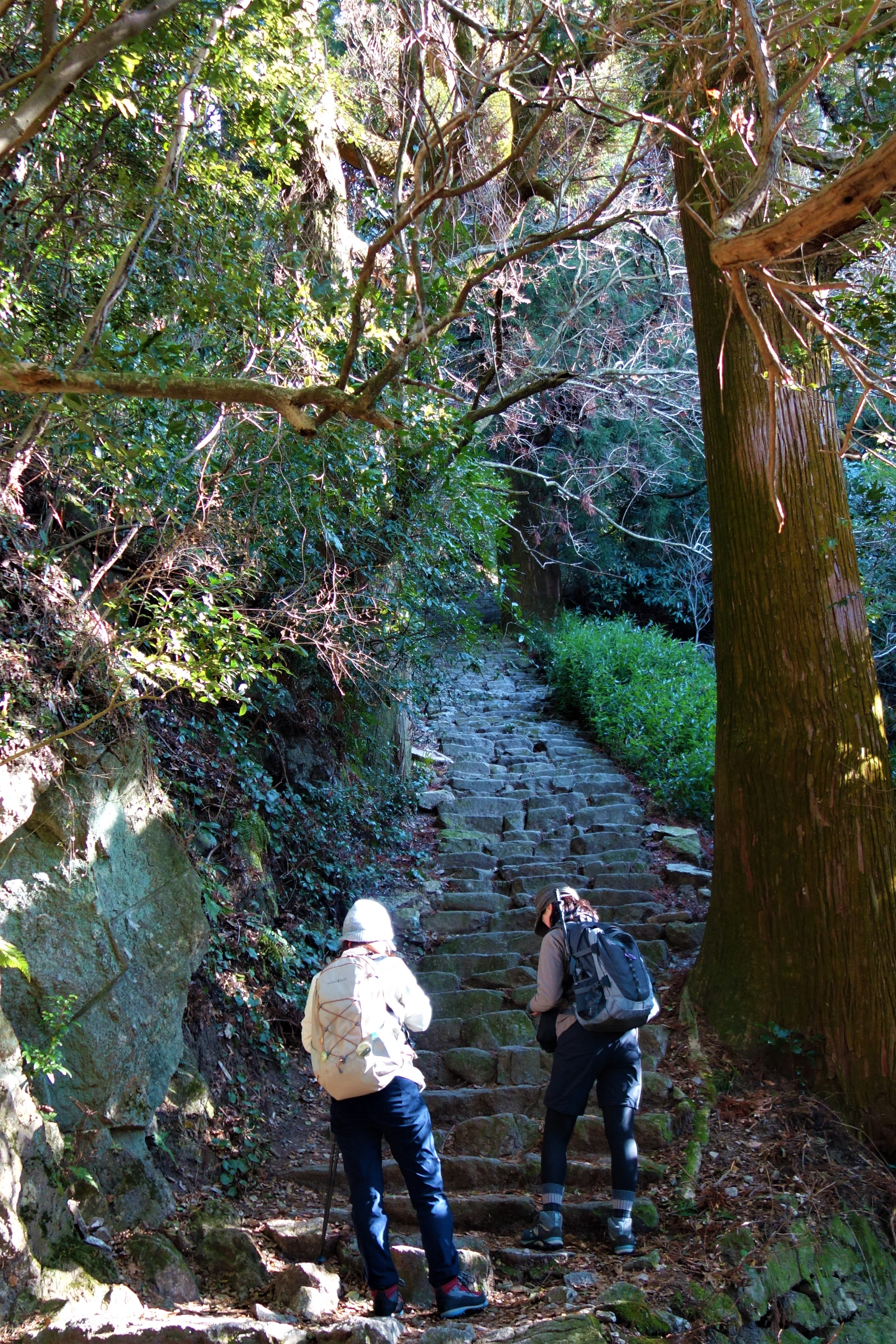
Hyakudan Gangi

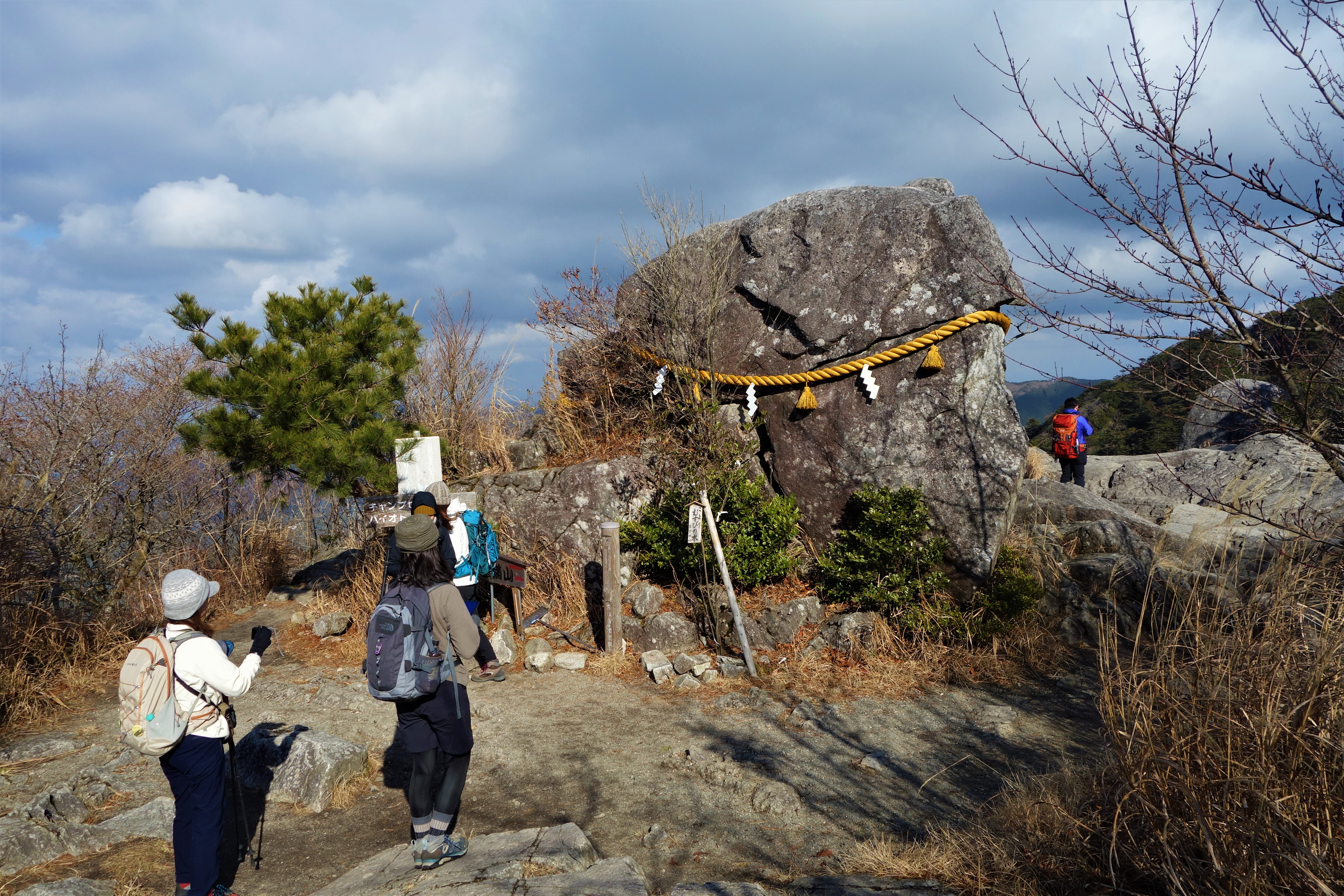
Summit

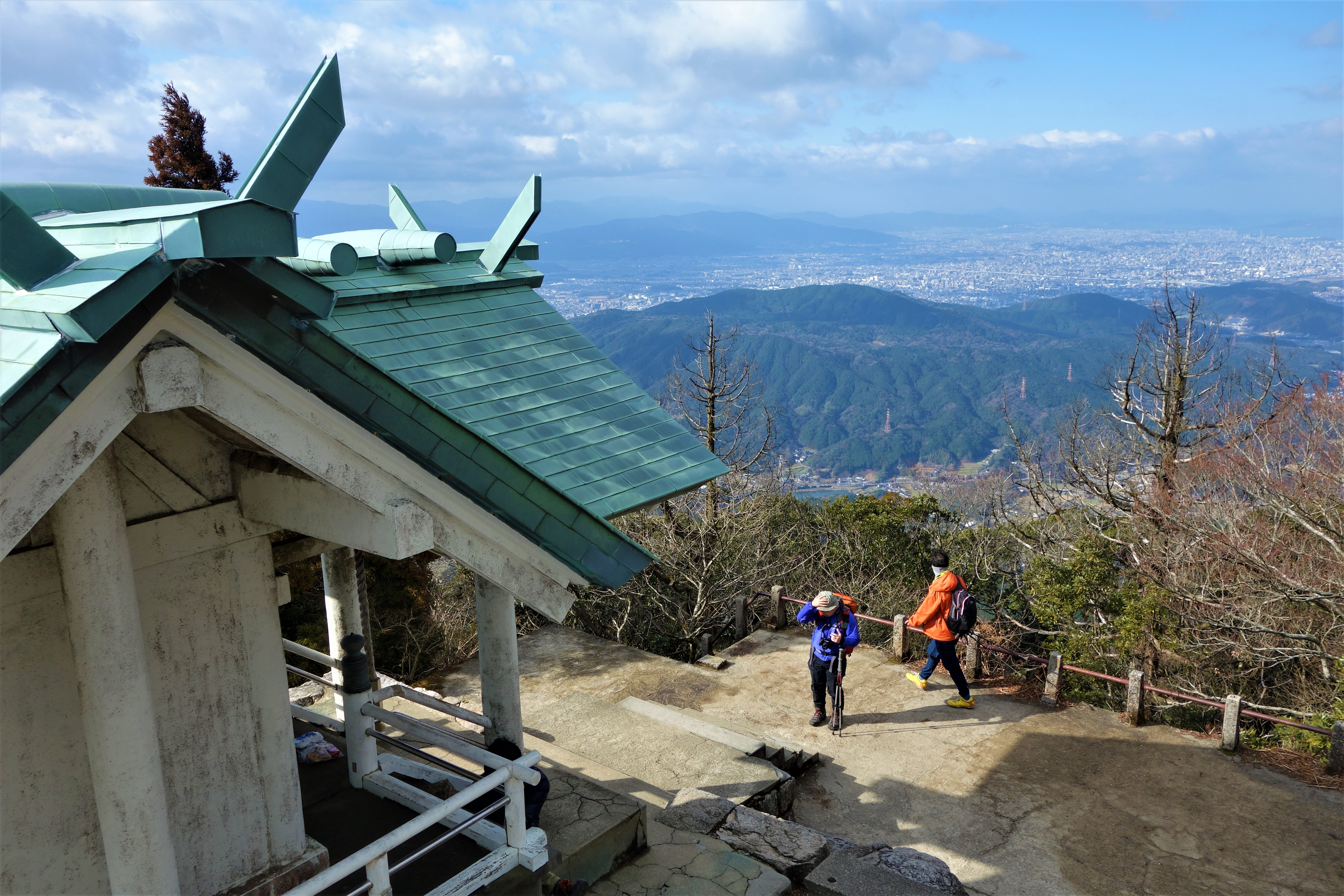
Kamado Shrine（upper shrine）

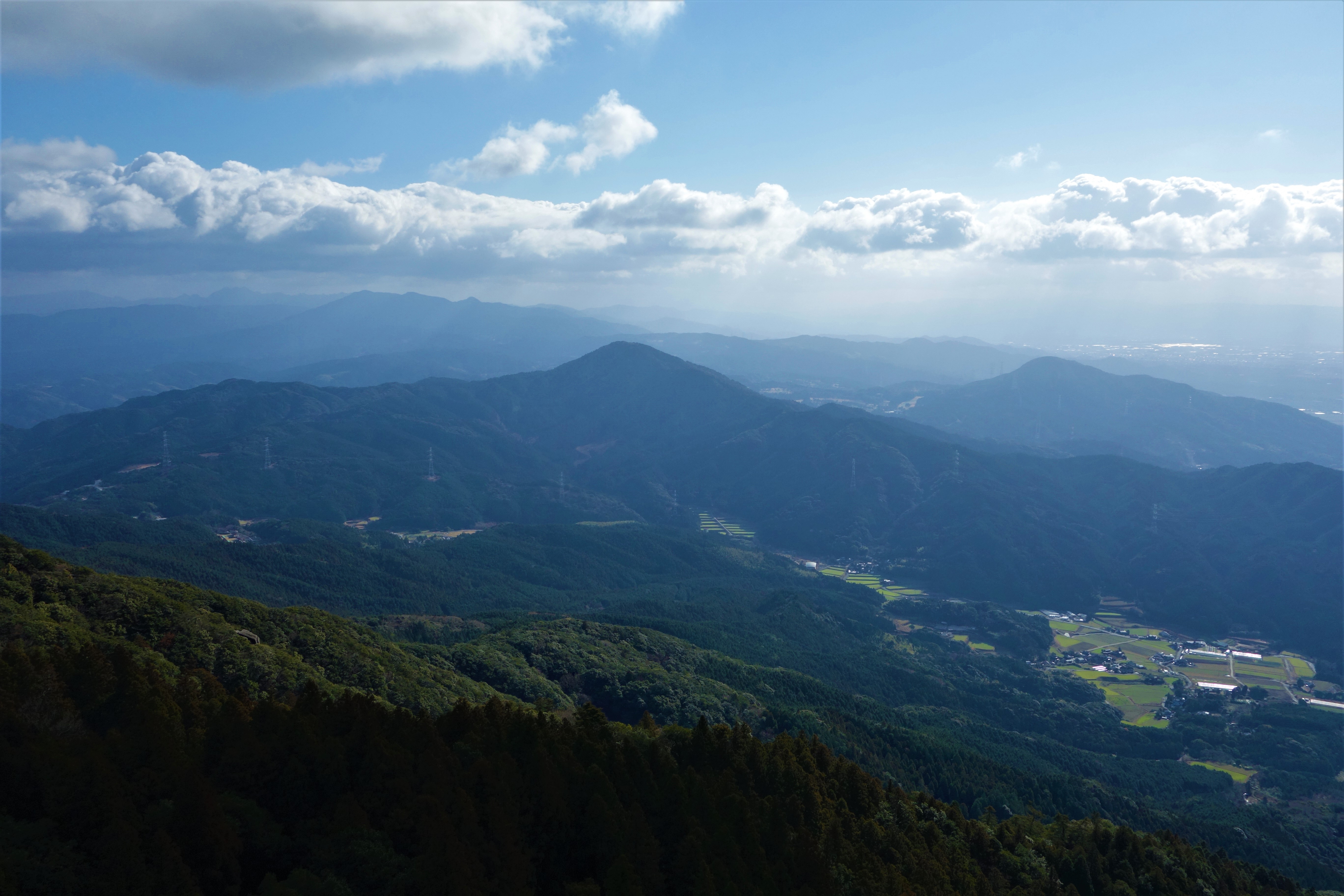
Mt. Hiko (farthest left) and Mt. Kosho from Mt. Homan

== See also ==
- List of Historic Sites of Japan (Fukuoka)
- Mount Hiko
- Mount Kubote
- Kamado-jinja
- Dazaifu Prefectural Natural Park
