= Hikosan Jingū =

Shinto shrine located in Soeda, Fukuoka prefecture, Japan

Hikosan Jingū 英彦山神宮
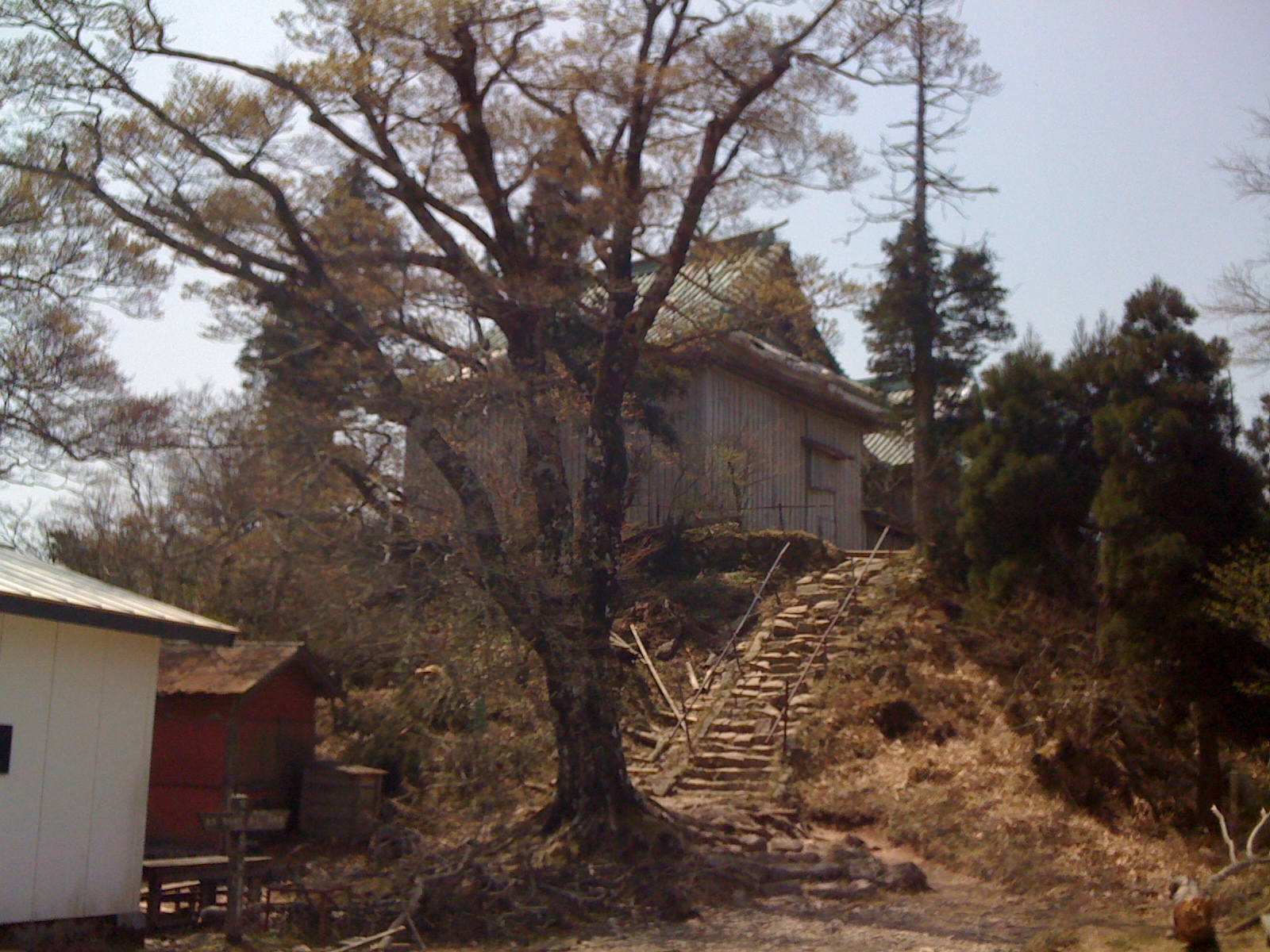
- Hikosan Jingū Grand Shrine at the summit of Mt. Hiko.

- Location within Japan

Religion
- Affiliation: Shinto
- Deity: Amenooshihomimi; Izanagi; Izanami-no-Mikoto

Location
- Location: 1 Hiko-san, Soeda; Tagawa District; Fukuoka
- Coordinates: 33.477944°N 130.926222°E

Architecture
- Established: 546

Hikosan Jingū (英彦山神宮) is a Shinto shrine located in Soeda, Fukuoka prefecture, Japan. Located on the boundary between Fukuoka and Oita Prefectures, Hiko-san has been venerated from ancient times as a sacred mountain. It was also a center of training for the Shugendō sect of Buddhism. The shrine is located on the Fukuoka Prefecture side of the mountain. The Jō-gu is located in the innermost part of the shrine grounds on the top of Naka-dake, the center peak of the three Hiko-san peaks. The sanctuary is said to have been built in 546. The Hōhei-den, a large lecture hall built in 1616, and the Kane-no-Torii, a bronze Shinto gateway built in 1637, have both been designated Important Cultural Properties by the Japanese government.

== History ==
The shrine was originally built in 546 as a center of training for the Shugendō Yamabushi sect of Buddhism. However, the Shugendō temple was abolished by the separation of Shinto from Buddhism, introduced after the Meiji Restoration. Reisen-ji (霊泉寺), the head temple of the Tendai Buddhism, was converted into Hikosan Jinja (英彦山神社). In 1975, it was renamed and status elevated to its present name, Hikosan Jingū. It is the only Jingu in Fukuoka prefecture and is the oldest of three original sacred mountains of the Yamabushi. In the former Modern system of ranked Shinto shrines it was an imperial shrine of the second rank or kanpei-chūsha (官幣中社).

== List of abbots ==
List of abbots of Hikosan:

The Six Superior Men (六上人, Roku shōnin)

1. Zenshō 善正 (?–582)
2. Hōren 法蓮 (?–829)
3. Raun 羅運 (?–835)
4. Mokuren 木練 (?–934)
5. Shinkei 真慶 (?–979)
6. Zōkei 増慶 (?–1006)

Muromachi period and Sengoku period

1. Joyū 助有 (?–1349); first monzeki abbot
2. Jōyū 浄有 (?–1396)
3. Yūchū 有忠 (?–1413)
4. Yūshun 有俊 (?–1433)
5. Yūi 有依 (?–1440)
6. Yūgon 有厳 (?–1461)
7. Raiyū 頼有 (?–1484)
8. Gyōyū 堯有 (?–1499)
9. Kōyū 興有 (?–1507)
10. Yūin 有胤 (?–1530)
11. Yūshin 有信 (?–1552)
12. Rennyū 連有 (?–1567)
13. Renchū 連忠 (?–1569)
14. Shunnyū 舜有 (?–1587)

Edo period

1. Chūyū 忠有 (?–1662)
2. Yūshō 有清 (?–1653)
3. Ryōyū 亮有 (1629–1674)
4. Kōyū 広有 (1652–1679)
5. Shōyū 相有 (1654–1714)
6. Hoyū 保有 (1685–1743)
7. Yūyo 有誉 (1687–1765)
8. Kōyū 孝有 (?–1772)
9. Shōyū 韶有 (1755–73)
10. Myōyū 妙有 (1759–1811)
11. Yūsen 有宣 (1781–1829)
12. Kyōyū 教有 (1825–1872; took the name Takachiho Noriari (高千穂教有) after 1868)

== Gallery ==
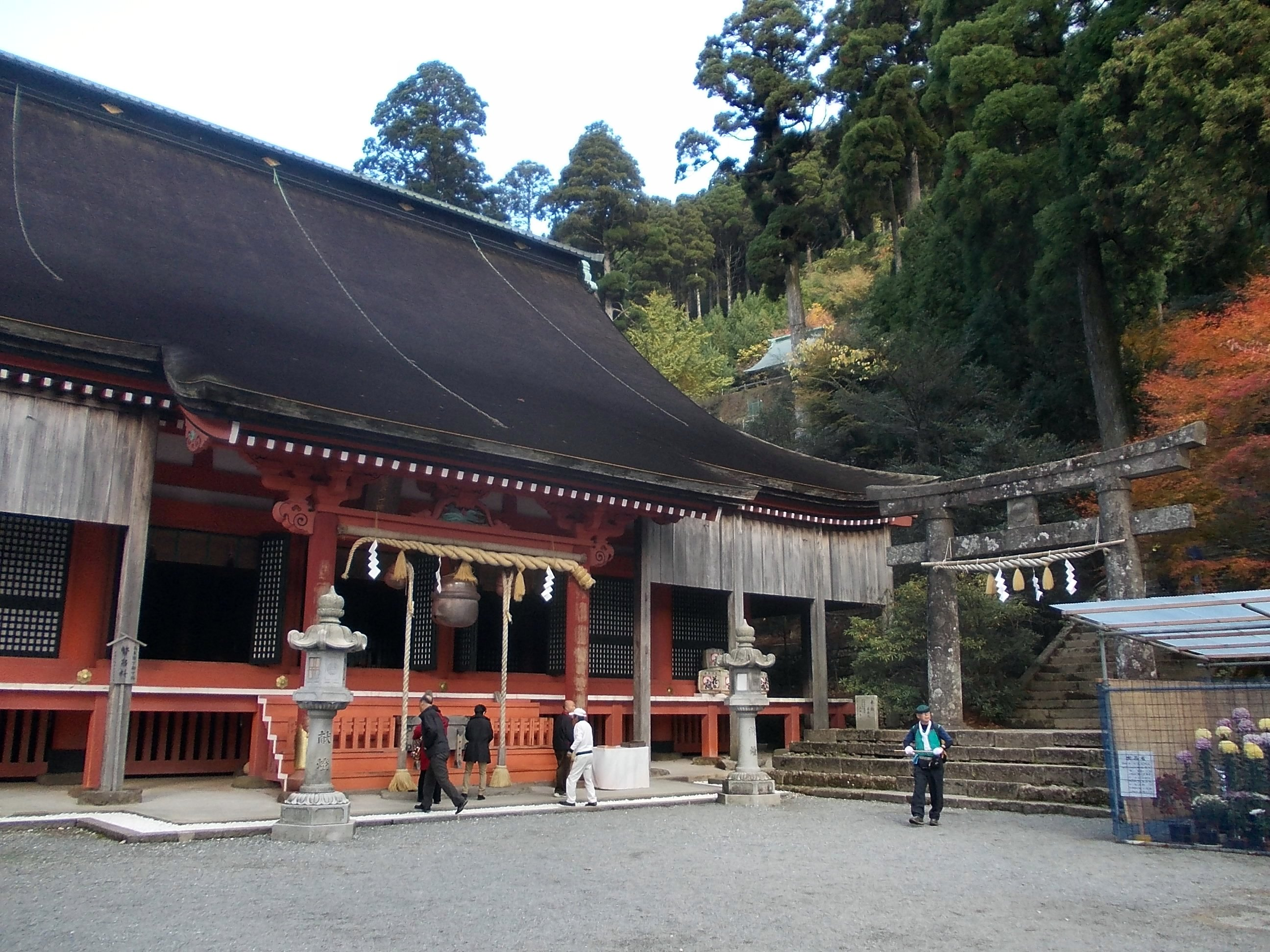
Hōhei-den (Important Cultural Property)

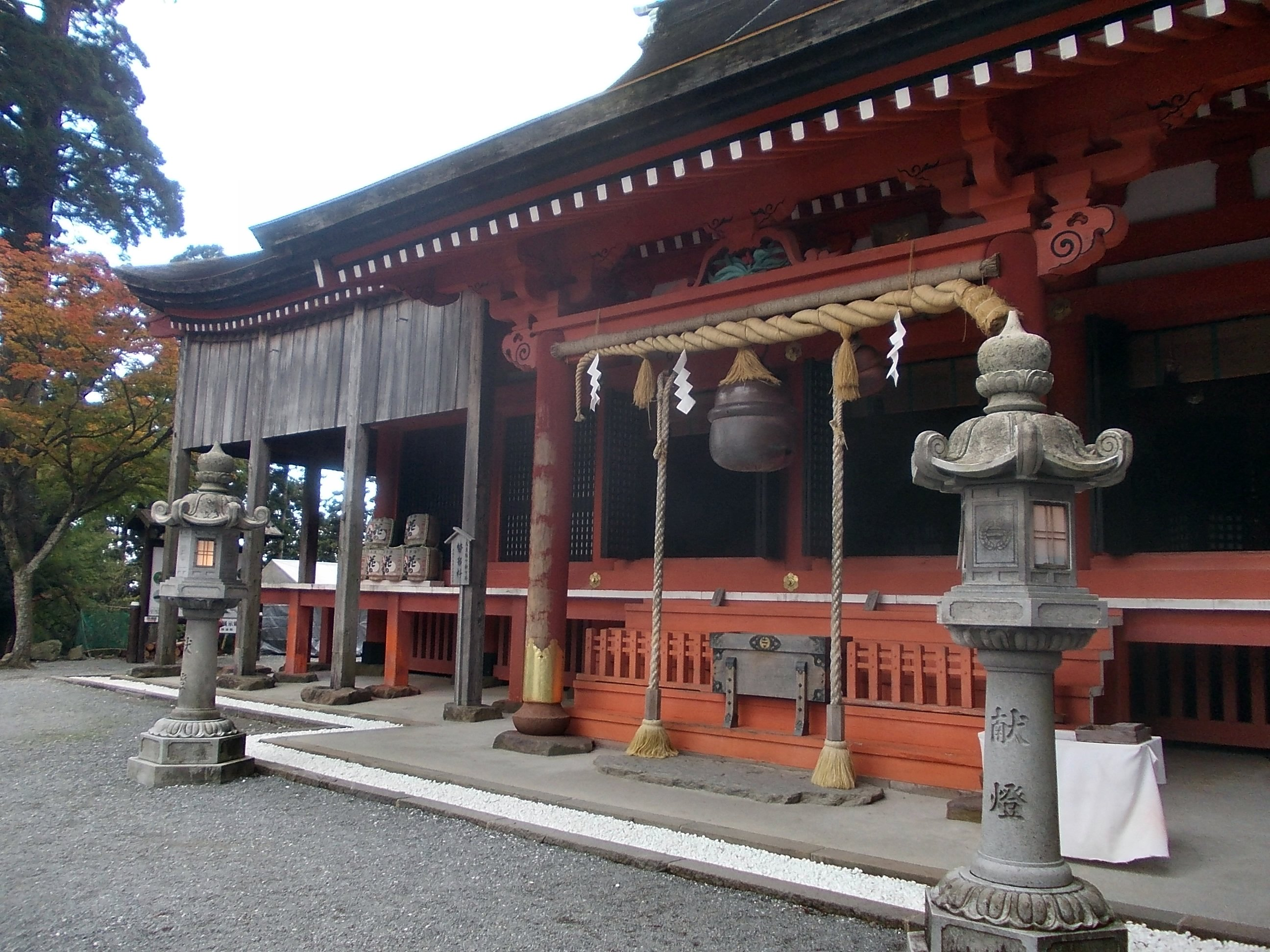
Hōhei-den (Important Cultural Property)

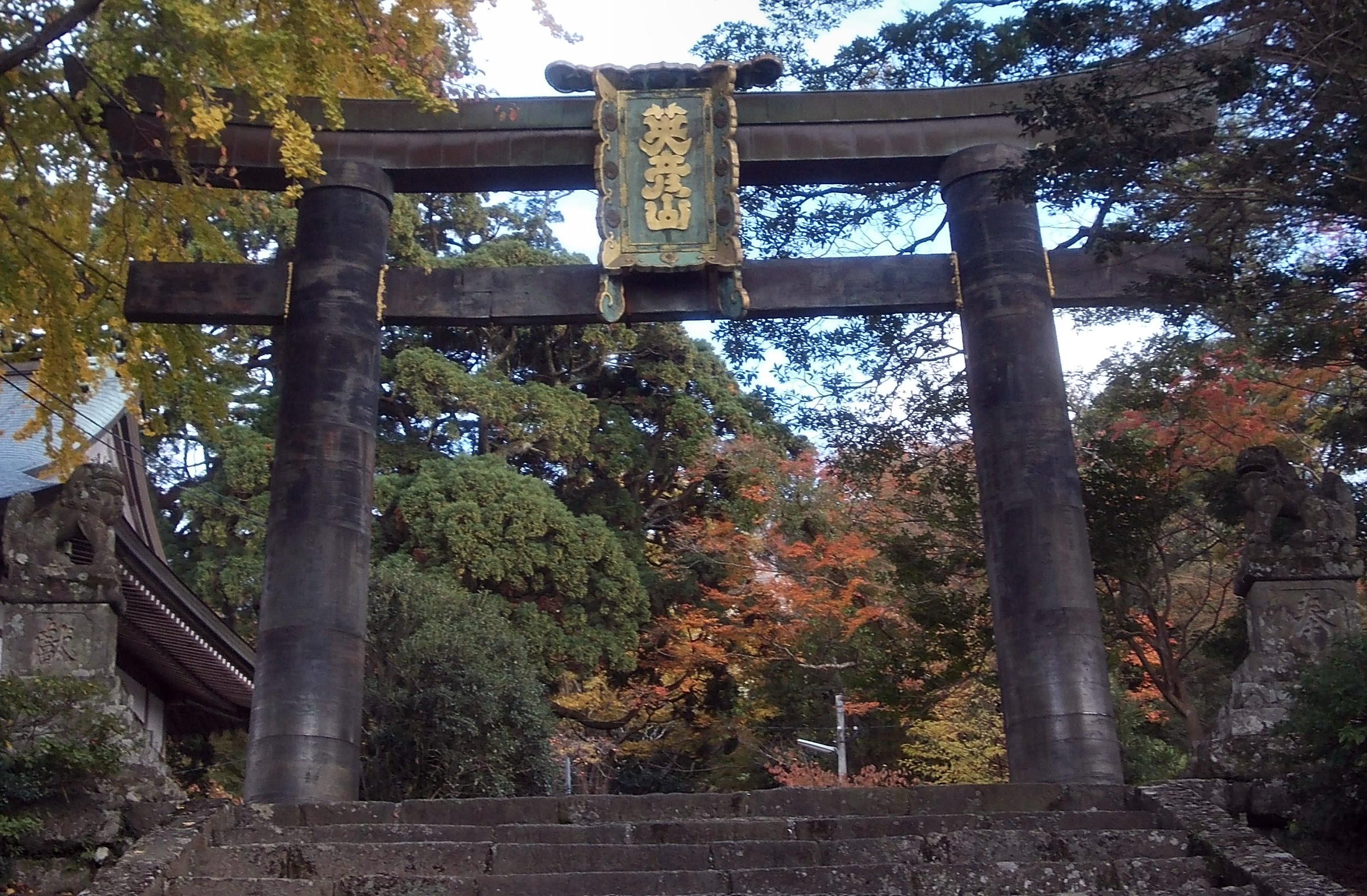
Kane-no-Torii (Important Cultural Property)

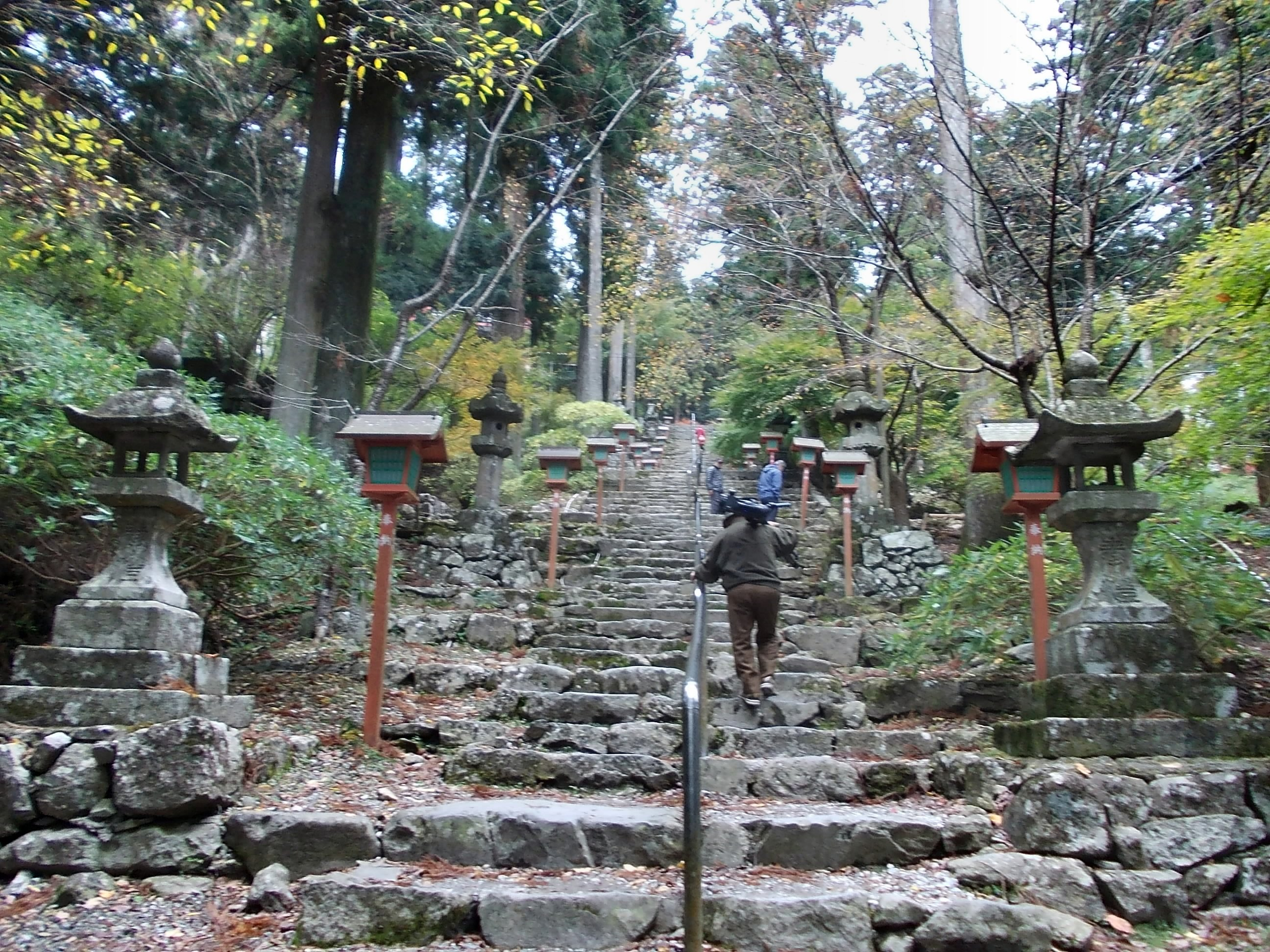
Omotesandō, very steep stone stairways approaching to the shrine.

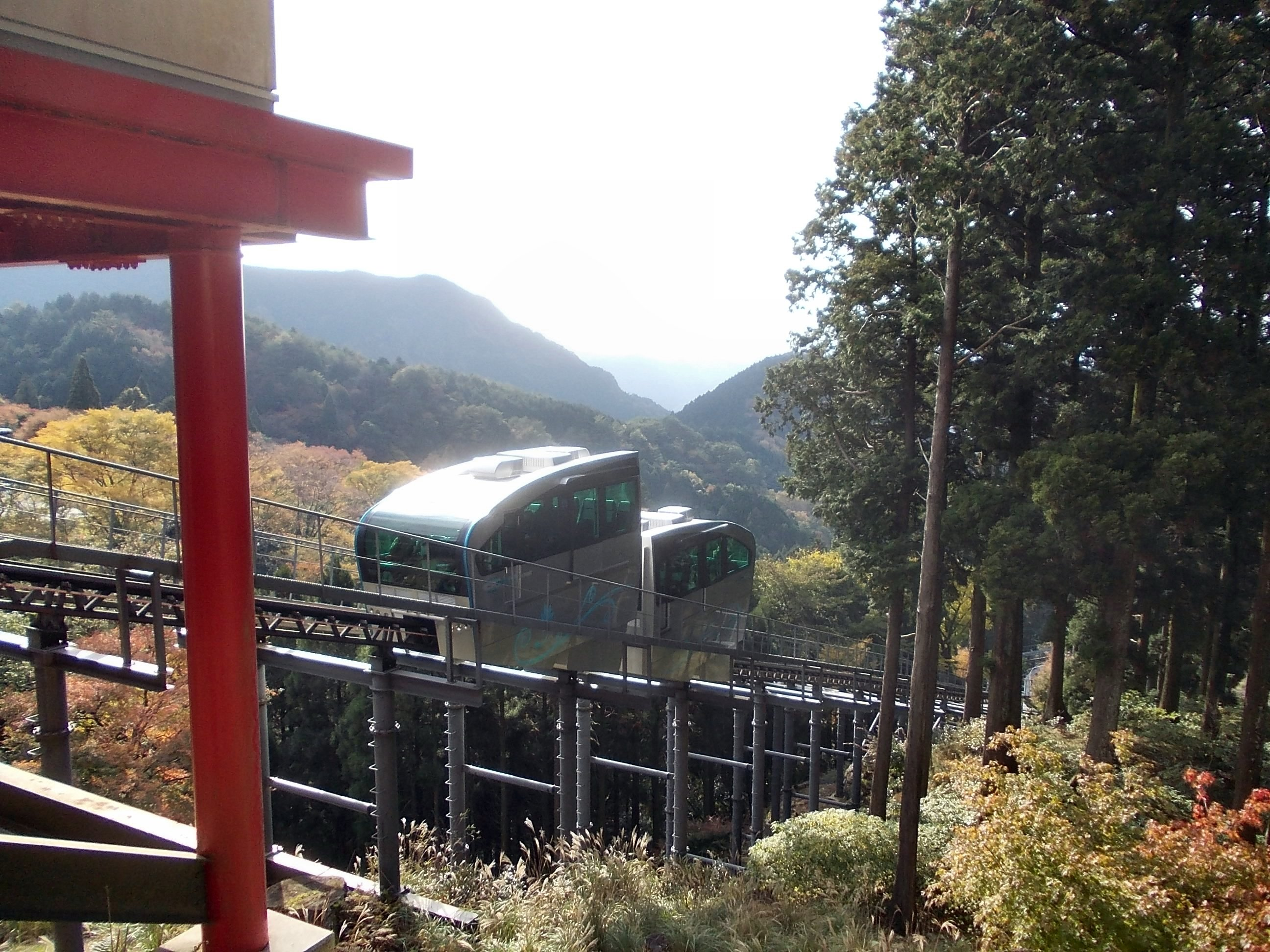
Hikosan Kaen Slope car, a monorail system run from Kane-no-Torii to Hikosan Jingū, was open in 2005.

== See also ==
- Mount Hiko
- Shugendō
- List of Shinto shrines
