= Kamado Shrine =

Shrine in Dazaifu, Fukuoka

Kamado Jinja 竈門神社
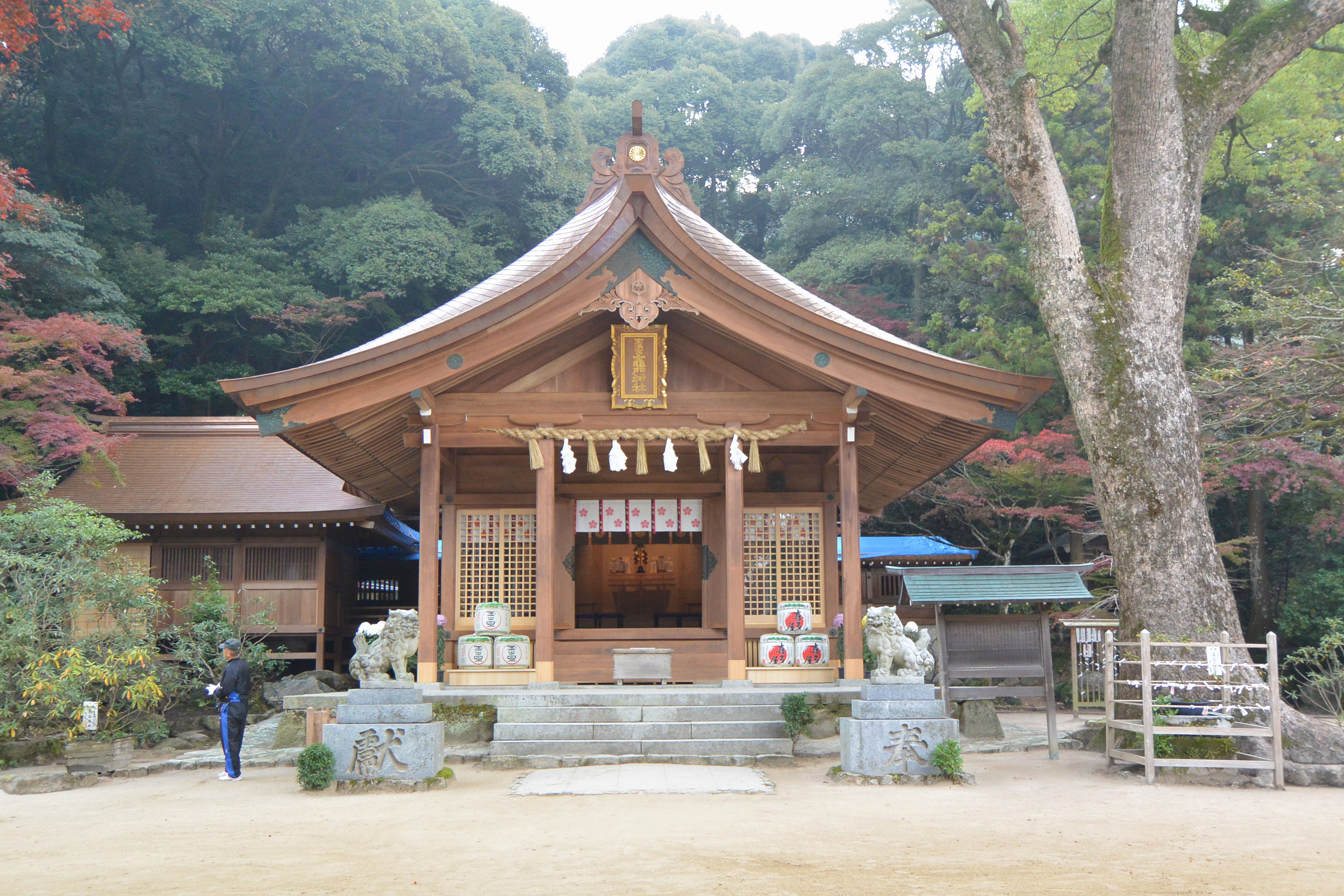
- Haiden, or the main hall

- Location within Japan

Religion
- Affiliation: Shinto
- Deity: Tamayori-bime; Emperor Ōjin; Empress Jingū

Location
- Location: 883 Uchiyama, Dazaifu; Fukuoka
- Interactive map of Kamado Jinja 竈門神社
- Coordinates: 33.5398°N 130.5690°E

Architecture
- Established: 673

Website
- www.kamadojinja.or.jp

Kamado-jinja (竈門神社) is a Shinto shrine located in Dazaifu, Fukuoka prefecture, Japan. Located at the top of Mount Hōman, which has been venerated from ancient times as a sacred mountain, the shrine is dedicated to Tamayori-bime, Emperor Ōjin, and Empress Jingū. The peripheral zone of Mount Hōman, including the shrine, is a National historic site. It was formerly an imperial shrine of the first rank (官幣社, kanpeisha) in the Modern system of ranked Shinto Shrines.

== History ==
The shrine was said to have been founded by Emperor Tenji when he built a castle surrounded by water and moved the authority in Dazaifu to the present-day Tofurō Ruins for defensive purposes in 664, due to his defeat in the Battle of Baekgang in August of the previous year. He dedicated the shrine to thousands of gods at Mount Hōman, which faces an unlucky direction. It has two sanctuaries, one at the foot of the mountain and one at its peak. There used to be a third sanctuary midway up the hillside, but only its ruins remains today. The upper sanctuary was founded in honor of Tamayori-bime appearing while the monk Shinren was performing his ascetic training in 683. The shrine is also known for being a great place for cherry blossom viewing in the spring, and many people visit in the autumn to see the fall foliage.

== Gallery ==
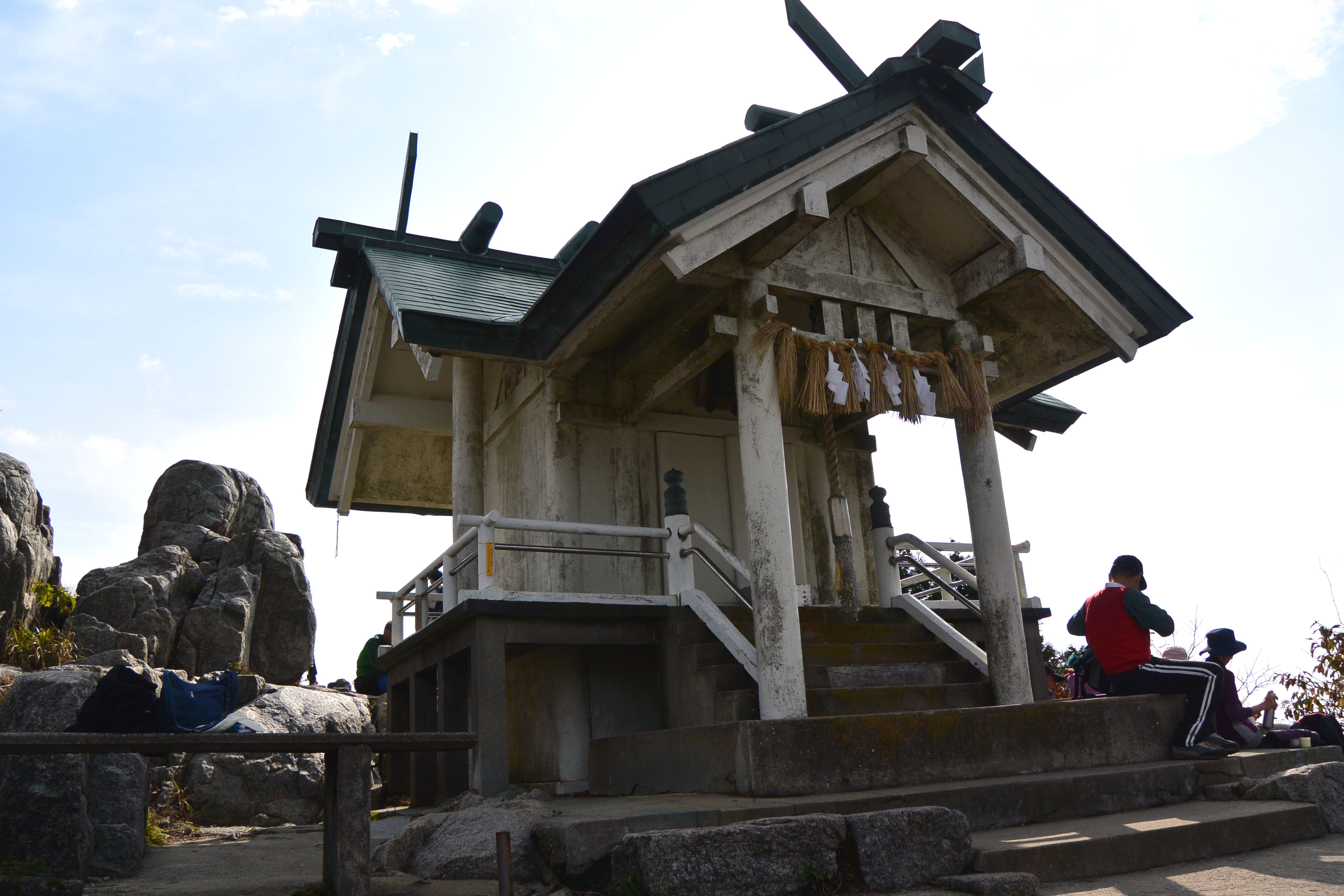
The upper sanctuary at the summit of Mount Hōman.

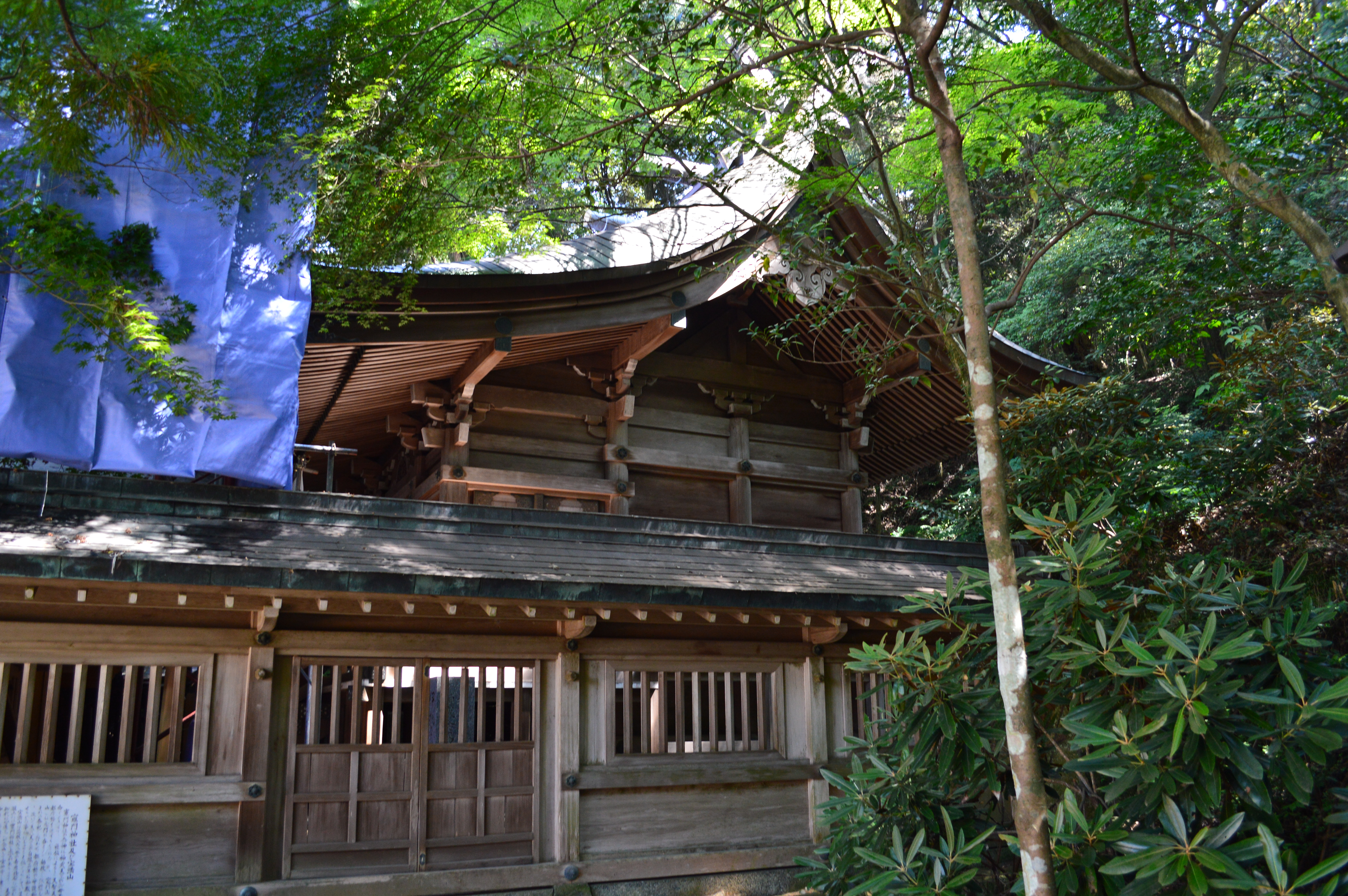
The Ge-gu honden or the main shrine at the foot of the mountain.

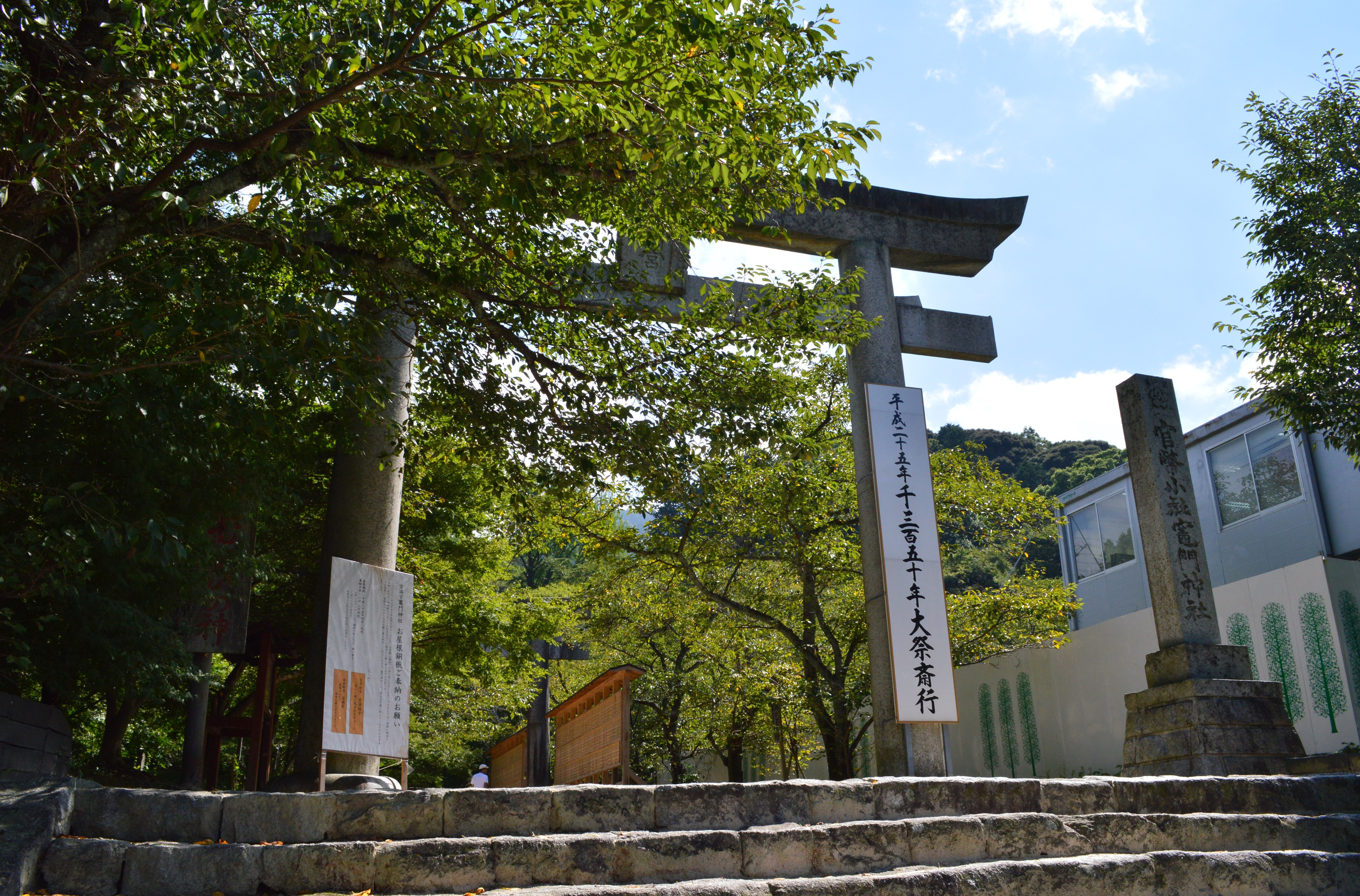
The first torii at the bottom.

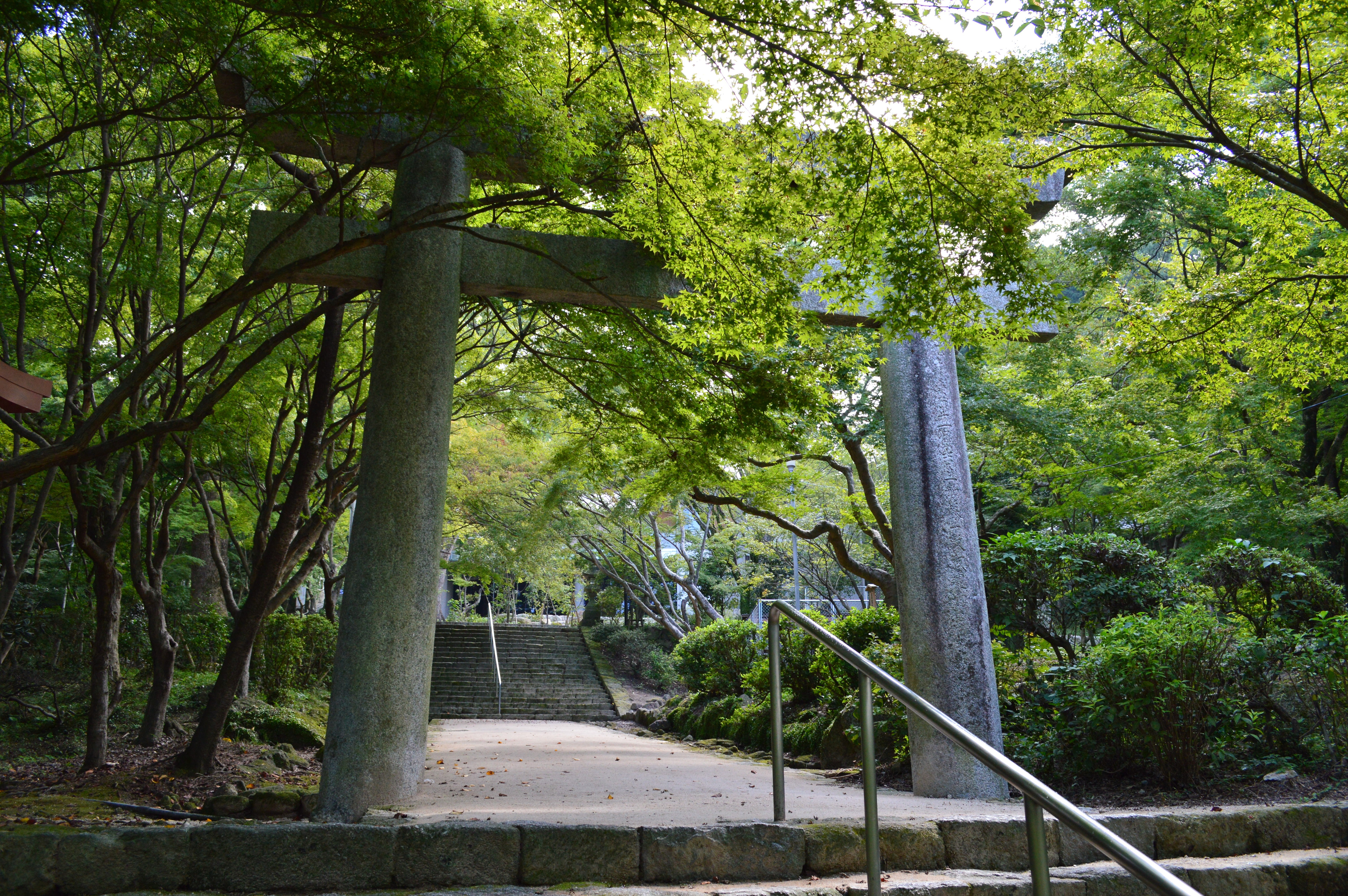
The third torii

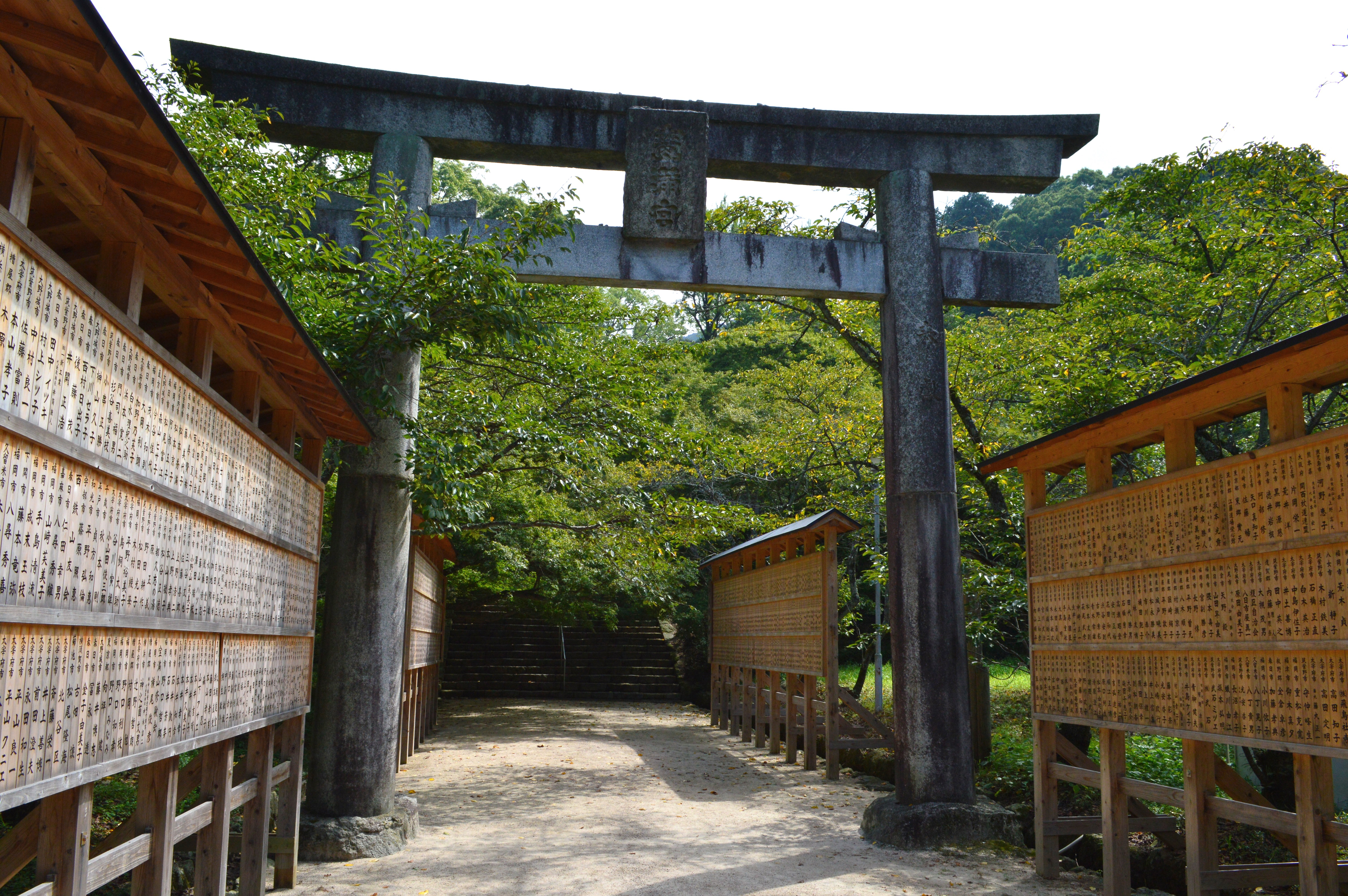
The second torii

== See also ==
- Mount Hōman
- List of Shinto shrines
