= Dazaifu Prefectural Natural Park =

Natural park of Fukuoka prefecture, Japan

- 太宰府県立自然公園
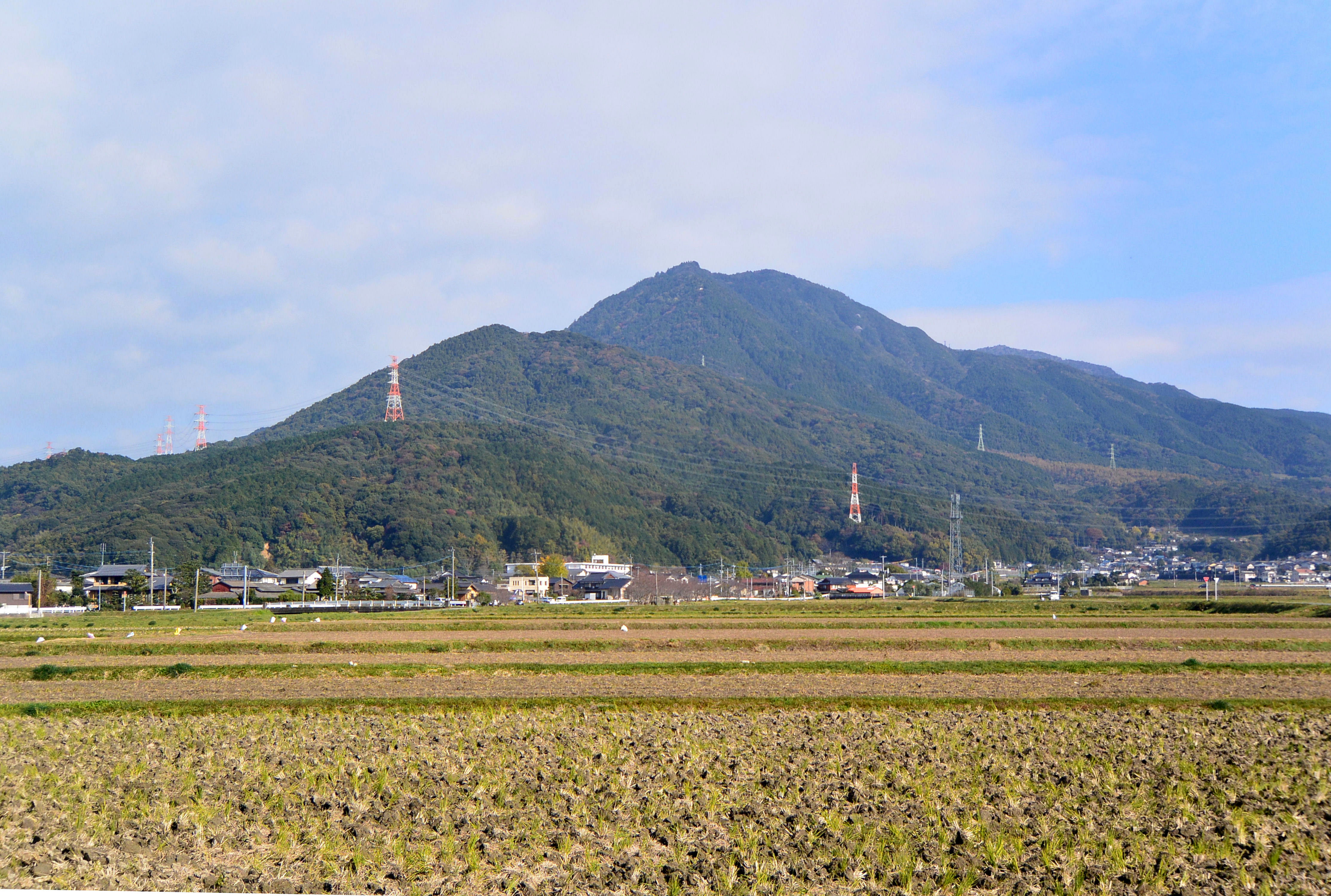
- Hōmanzan
- Interactive map of Dazaifu Prefectural Natural Park
- Location: Fukuoka Prefecture, Japan
- Coordinates: 33°32′23″N 130°34′8″E
- Area: 165.68 km^{2} (63.97 sq mi)
- Established: 13 May 1950

Dazaifu Prefectural Natural Park (太宰府県立自然公園, Dazaifu kenritsu shizen kōen) is a Prefectural Natural Park in Fukuoka Prefecture, Japan. Established in 1950, the park spans the municipalities of Iizuka, Miyawaka, Ōnojō, Dazaifu, Chikushino, Hisayama, Umi, Sasaguri, and Sue.

== See also ==
- Mount Hōman
- National Parks of Japan
- List of Places of Scenic Beauty of Japan (Fukuoka)
