= Monorackbahn =

Small industrial monorail system

Monorackbahn is a small monorail rack railway manufactured by the Doppelmayr/Garaventa Group. Its style is derived from industrial monorails used in 1960s vineyards. There are more than 650 Monorackbahn systems installed across Switzerland, Germany and Italy.

== History ==
The idea for the development of the Monorackbahn started in the 1960's and came from Japan in the form of slope cars which were used on orchards. The original manufacturer Yoneyama Industry named them "Monorack" (モノラック, Monorakku) by 1966. The first models were primarily used for transporting bags of fruit in the beginning. Garaventa designed similar systems for usage in vineyards in the 1960s which could also carry workers. It did pick up the brand name Monorack by 1976. The main difference between the Japanese and European systems was the type of rail being used for tracks with the Japanese systems using 4 cm and the European systems using 6 cm square tubing. The cooperation between Nikkari in Japan and Habegger in Switzerland started in 1975, so the Monorack tractors are mostly identical.

The Garaventa system is designed for loads up to 250 kilograms (550 lb) and 100% (45°) slopes. In the newest system (as of 2021) an 48 Volt Li ion battery pack is used with a 6 kW motor. The base size of 3.6 kWh allows for 60 min of operation. Connector pads for the charging stations can be attached to the rail so that recharging starts automatically at the end points. The system is so prevalent in vineyards along the Rhine that it is also named Vinayard rail (German Weinbergsbahn). This is ambiguous as Feldbahn system are also used for agricultural transportation including vineyards. Apart from usage in vineyards, Monorackbahn systems are also found at complex construction sites in Europe.

== Types ==
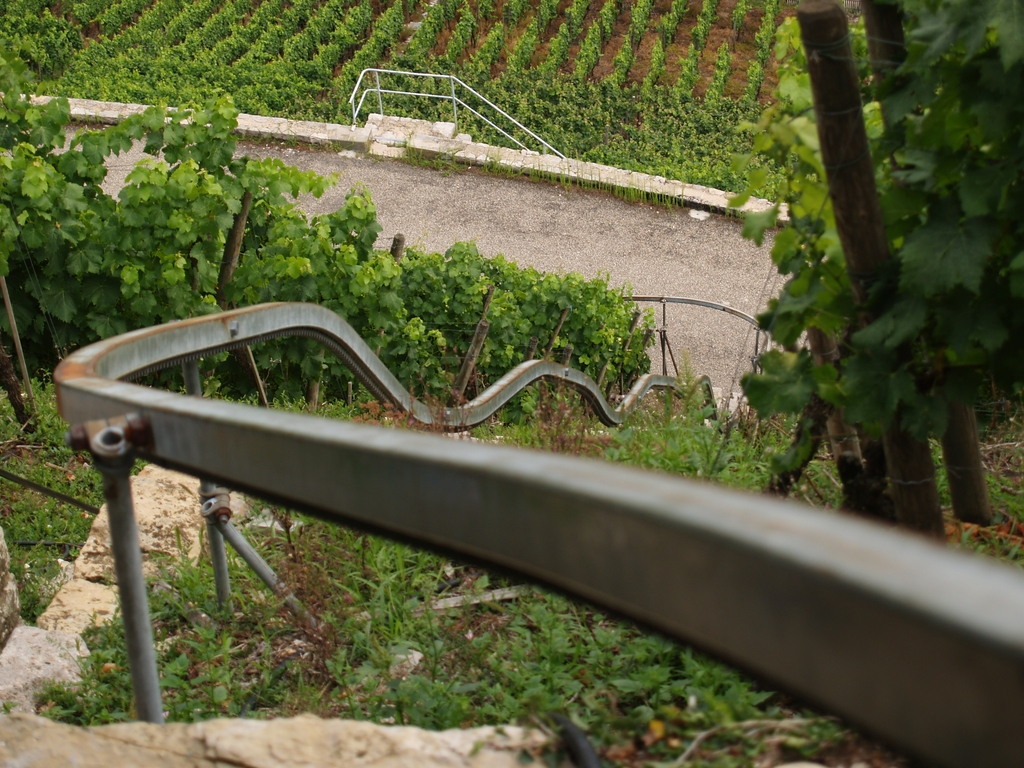
Monorackbahn alignment in a vineyard near Mundelsheim

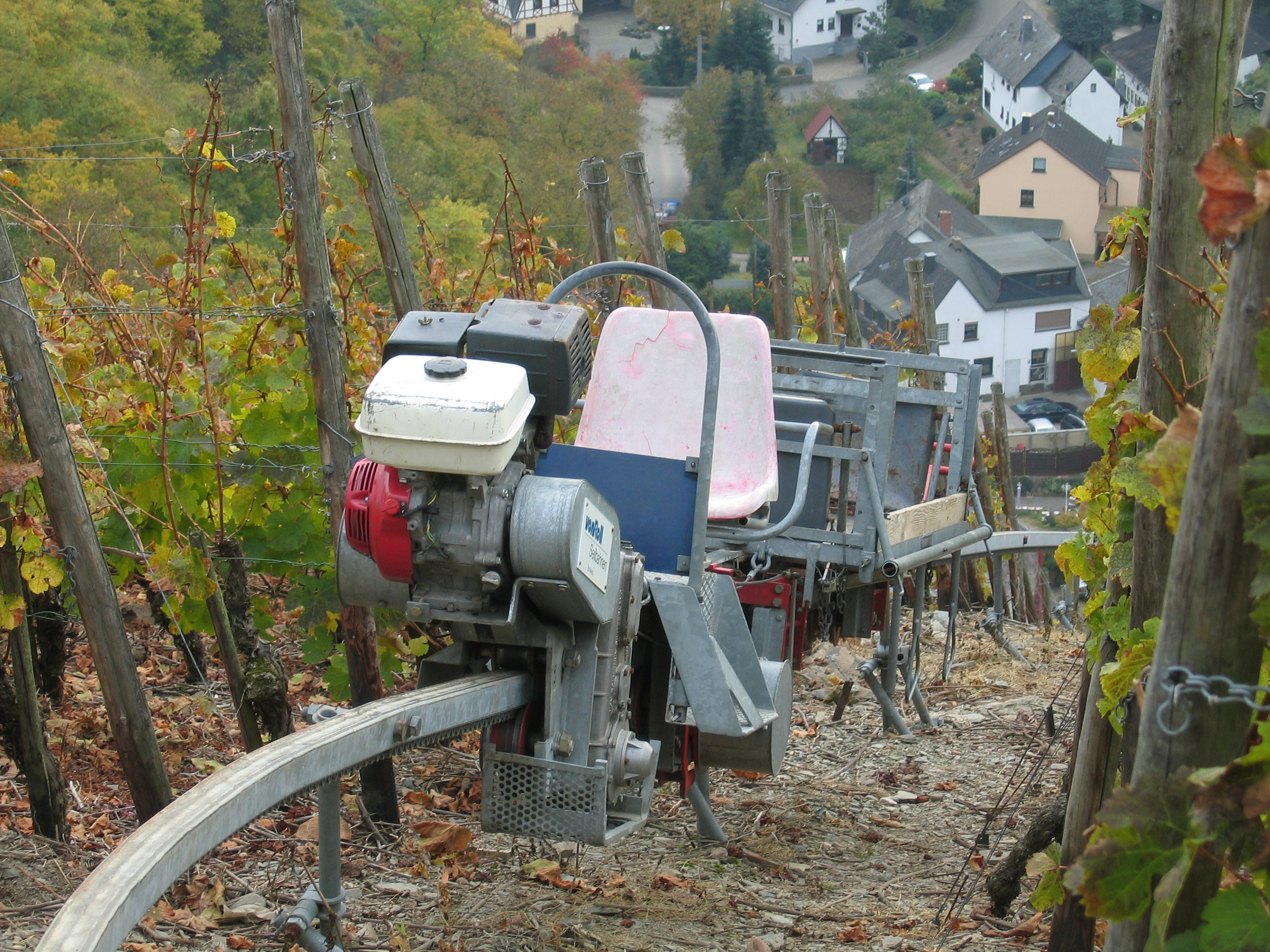
Petrol powered car of Monorackbahn in a vineyard near Kobern-Gondorf

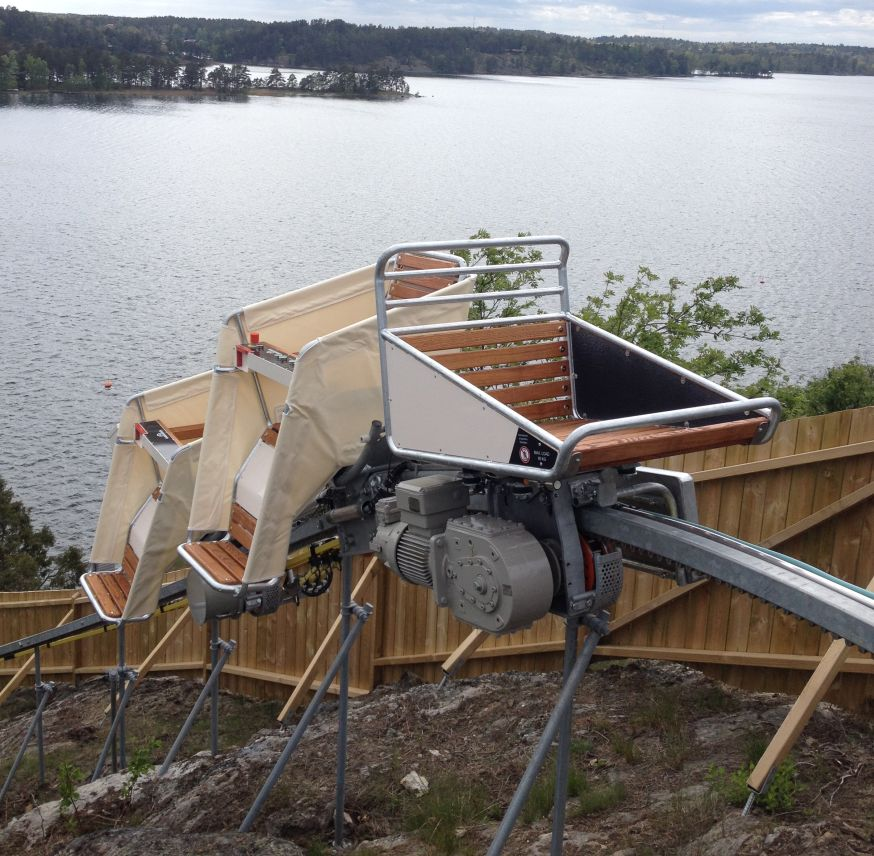
Electrical people mover based on a Monorackbahn
