= Slope car =

Small automated monorail/inclined elevator used in Japan & South Korea

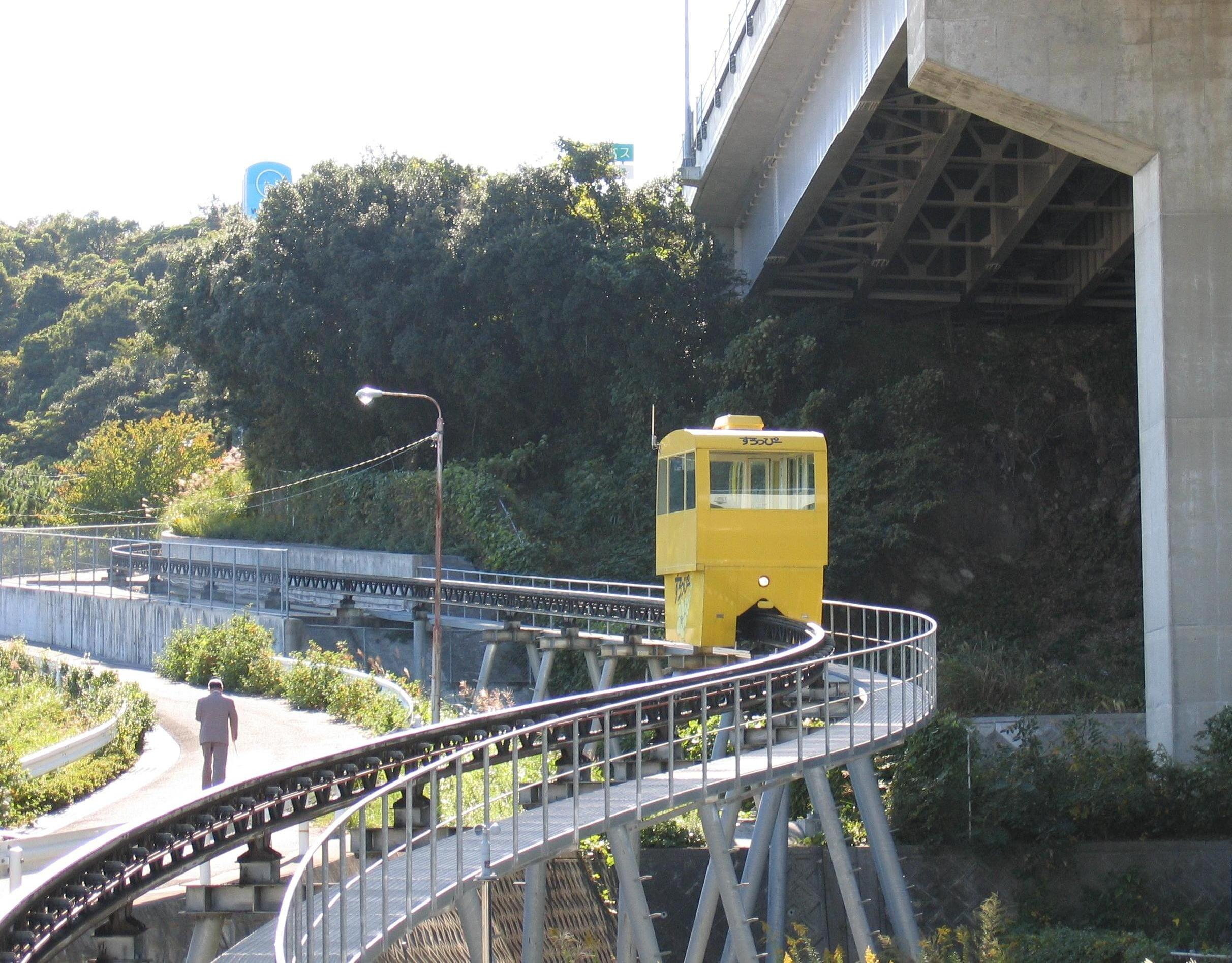
Slope car at Muya Bus Stop, Naruto, Tokushima

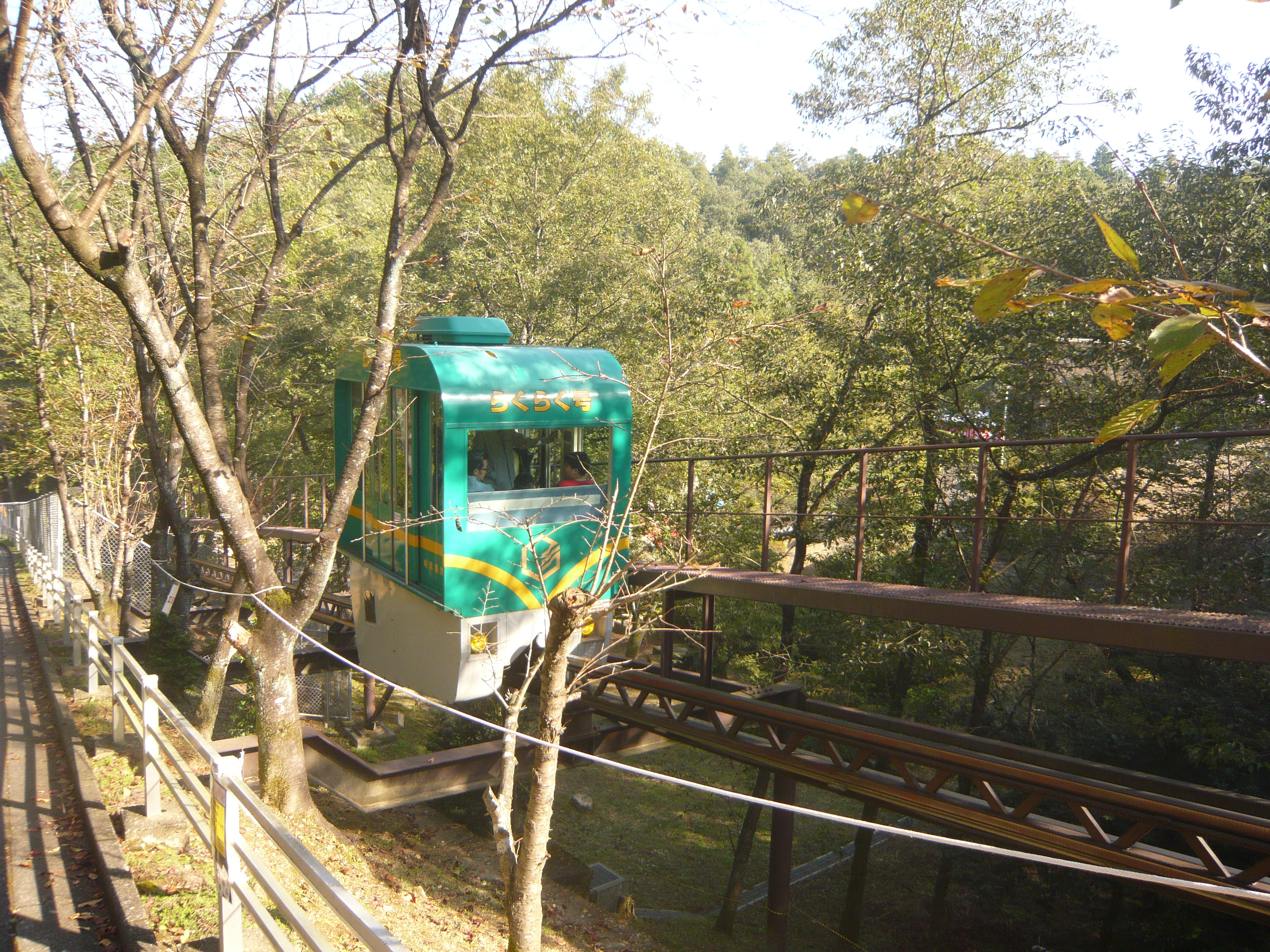
Rakuraku-gō, a slope car at Gifu Prefectural Museum, Seki, Gifu

A slope car (スロープカー, surōpukā) is a small automated monorail, or a fusion between monorail, people mover, inclined elevator and rack railway. It is a brand name of Kaho Manufacturing. Since this mode of transportation is relatively uncommon, it lacks a widely accepted generic name, other than the simple "monorail". The system is different from normal modern monorails in many ways. It is a development from industrial monorails used in 1960s orchards. Slope cars are installed in more than 80 places in Japan and South Korea.

== Overview ==
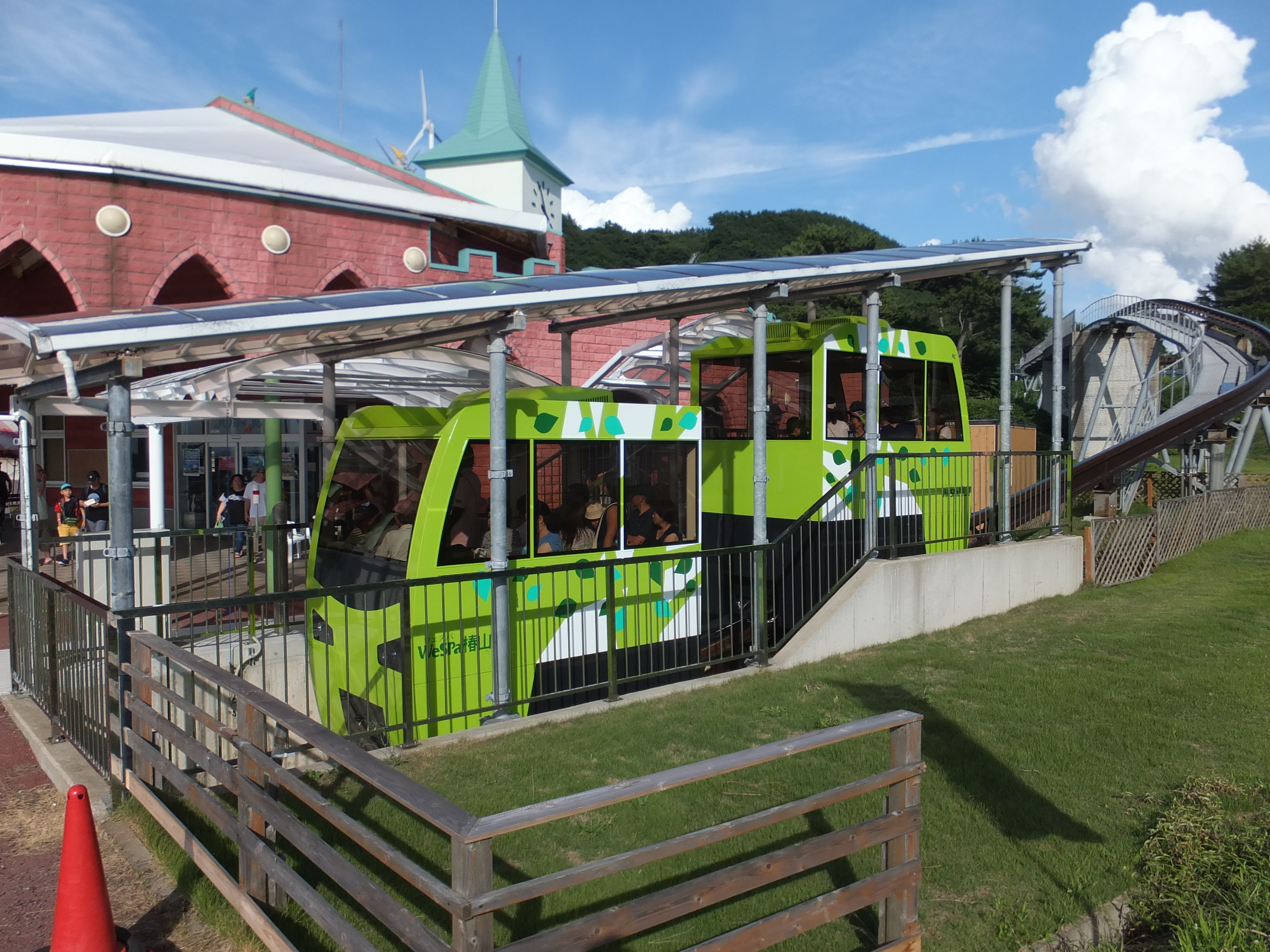
Slope car at Wespa Tsubakiyama, Fukaura, Aomori

The system is introduced generally when there are steep slopes or stairs between entrance gates and buildings. Slope cars generally function as amenities that provide accessibilities for elderly or handicapped people visiting particular places, such as parks, golf courses, or hotels. As most lines move fairly slowly, people without disabilities often find it faster to walk the same routes on foot, rather than to use slope cars. However, there are also places where slope cars climb very steep slopes which people without disabilities can not climb unless there are stairs. In Japan, slope cars are not legally considered as railways.

== System ==
There is a type that is 3 m (9 ft 10 in) long, having a 4 to 8 passengers capacity, and another type that is 6 m (19 ft 8 1/4 in) long, having around 30 passengers capacity. Some slope cars are "trainsets" consisting of two cars. Most slope cars are straddle-beam monorails, but there are suspended monorail slope cars as well. Normal monorails generally use rubber tyres running on a concrete beam, while slope cars use a steel beam with a rack rail on one side. As such, slope cars can climb 100% (45°) slopes at maximum speed. The system is powered by a "third rail" on the other side of the beam.

The system does not require a driver. A car starts when a user pushes a button, and it automatically stops at the selected destination.

== History ==
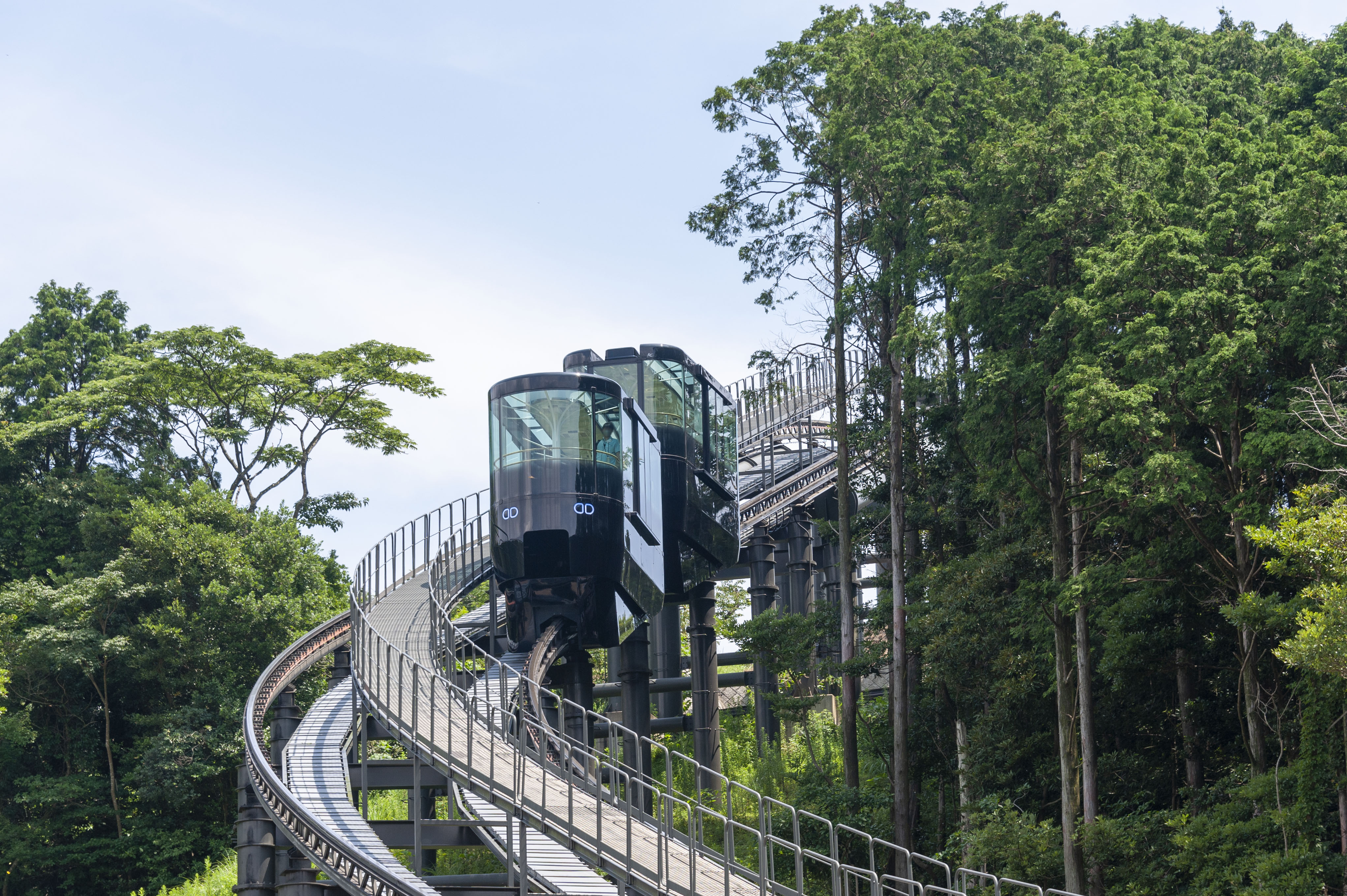
Slope car at Mount Inasa, Nagasaki

In 1966, Yoneyama Industory, an agricultural machinery maker in Matsuyama, Ehime Prefecture, invented "Monorack" (モノラック, Monorakku), a freight-only rack monorail system. It soon became widespread in mikan citrus orchards in the prefecture, and in other parts of Japan. Other makers also started to build similar systems. Later in 1990, a company called Chigusa developed a passenger rack monorail system. These rack monorails were first used to transport workers in construction sites or forests. However, from 1990s, public facilities such as parks also started to use the system. Kaho Manufacturing started to sell their "slope cars" in 1990.

Similar systems were designed for vineyards in Switzerland and Germany in the 1960s. These were also transporting workers from the start. The brand name Monorack is used here for the Garaventa Monorackbahn since 1976. The main difference is the type of rail being used - the Japanese systems use 4 cm (1.6 in) and the European systems use 6 cm (2.4 in) square tubing. The cooperation between Nikkari in Japan and Habegger in Switzerland started in 1975, so the Monorack tractors are mostly identical.

== Other names ==
As "slope car" is the brand name of Kaho Manufacturing, similar, if not the same, concepts are called differently by different manufacturers.

- Ansaku makes Trans Mobile (トランスモービル, Toransu Mōbiru).
- Chigusa makes Raxcar (ラックスカー, Rakkusukā).
- Monorail Industry makes Monorider (モノライダー, Monoraidā).
- Senyō Kōgyō makes Mountain Liner (マウンテンライナー, Maunten Rainā).
- EMTC of Korea makes the Mountain Type (which has two rails) and the monorail Inclined Type and Locomotive Type
- Doppelmayr Garaventa makes the Monorack for agricultural use. They say they have installed 650 systems worldwide.

Slope cars are similar in some ways to personal rapid transit systems in that they offer on-demand service for individuals or small numbers of passengers.

== List of slope cars ==
=== Japan ===
Facility, line name	Function	Diagonal line length (m)	Diagonal line length (ft)	Speed (km/h)	Speed (mph)	Maximum gradient	Passenger capacity	Opening year	Location
Aburagi Dam	Dam	87	285	2.1	1.3	45°	6	2002	Soeda, Fukuoka
Aburayama Golf Course	Golf course	96	315	2.1	1.3	21°	4	2004	Fukuoka, Fukuoka
Akagi Kōgen Highland Pasture Kronenberg	Zorbing	70	230	4.8	3.0	11°		2003	Shibukawa, Gunma
Ashikita Kaihin Sōgō Park	Zorbing	140	460	4.8	3.0	15°		2003	Ashikita, Kumamoto
Amanohashidate Viewland	Park	393	1,289	3.3	2.0	25°	40		Miyazu Bay, Kyoto
Ashikita Kaihin Sōgō Park	Zorbing	153	502	5.1	3.2	11°40′		2005	Ashikita, Kumamoto
Bay Hill View Chayagadai	Diagonal elevator	30	98	1.8	1.1	24°	4	1999	Ōita, Ōita
Bukkō-ji Temple	Accessibility	38	125	1.8	1.1	29	6	2005	Kyōto, Kyōto
Bukkoku-ji Temple	Accessibility	90	300	2.4	1.5	15°	4	2004	Sendai, Miyagi
Cactus Herb Park	Park	191	627	4.8	3.0	19°30′	30	1995	Nichinan, Miyazaki
Funaoka Castle Park	Park	305	1,001	4.8	3.0	18°	40	1996	Shibata, Miyagi
Garden Sight Sakurajima, Sakurajima-gō	Diagonal elevator	27	89	1.7	1.0	32°30′	8	2001	Kagoshima, Kagoshima
Gassan Dam	Dam	166	545	2.7	1.7	35°32′	8	1994	Tsuruoka, Yamagata
Genkai Island	Accessibility	47	154	2.1	1.3	33°	2	1998	Fukuoka, Fukuoka
Gifu Prefectural Museum, Rakuraku-gō	Diagonal elevator	87	285	4.8	3.0	13°	8	2002	Seki, Gifu
Grandee Nasu Shirakawa Golf Club	Golf course	50	160	2.4	1.5	17°	6	2005	Nishigō, Fukushima
Hamamatsu Flower Park	Park	59.8	196	3.0	1.9	25°	16	2020	Hamamatsu City, Shizuoka
Hanatateyama Onsen	Park	99	325	3.0	1.9	15°	8	2004	Chikuzen, Fukuoka
Hanawa Ski Resort	Ski resort	212	696	5.4	3.4	28°	10	1996	Kazuno, Akita
Hayakuchi Dam	Dam	200	660	1.5	0.9	45°	2	2003	Ōdate, Akita
Hinokidai Danchi	Accessibility	87	285	3.9	2.4	22°	6	2000	Sasebo, Nagasaki
Hotel Hatsuhana	Park	30	98	1.8	1.1	29°50′	6	2005	Hakone, Kanagawa
Iiyama Ski Jump	Ski resort	136	446	5.4	3.4	27°	8	1999	Iiyama, Nagano
Iizuka City Chikuho Community Center	Accessibility	17	56	0.9	0.6	29°	3	1997	Iizuka, Fukuoka
Ikawa X Park	Zorbing	82	269	3.9	2.4	18°		2004	Miyoshi, Tokushima
Inaniwa Castle Konjakukan	Park	237	778	4.0	2.5	33°30′	24	1993	Yuzawa, Akita
Iya Onsen	Diagonal elevator			3.0	1.9	42°		2004	Miyoshi, Tokushima
Jōō-ji Temple	Accessibility	31	102	2.1	1.3	29°	4	2002	Taku, Saga
Kannondaki Park, Kajika-kun	Park	202	663	4.8	3.0	13°	10	1997	Satsuma, Kagoshima
Kayase Dam	Dam	231	758	1.5	0.9	45°	2	1999	Isahaya, Nagasaki
Kunimi Forest Park	Park	800	2,600	3.6	2.2	35°	40	2006	Shisō, Hyōgo
Maruoka Park	Park	236	774	3.0	1.9	15°	10	2005	Kirishima, Kagoshima
Mashiki Country Club	Golf course	73	240	3.6	2.2	24°	4	1992	Mashiki, Kumamoto
Masutani Dam	Dam	172	564	1.5	0.9	36°	2	2003	Minamiechizen, Fukui
Minami Kiyosato Flower Park	Park	185	607	3.6	2.2	25°30′	20	2000	Hokuto, Yamanashi
Minamihata Dam	Dam	79	259	2.1	1.3	28°	6	2003	Nakagawa, Fukuoka
Minaminooka Memorial Park	Accessibility	52	171	2.1	1.3	24°30′	6	2004	Yokohama, Kanagawa
Misawa Adonis Golf Club	Golf course	99	325	3.0	1.9	33°	4	1994	Ena, Gifu
Miyamoto residence	Accessibility	19	62	1.5	0.9	28°	2	1992	Hisayama, Fukuoka
Mizutori-gō	Accessibility	60	200	0.9	0.6	29°	2	2002	Nagasaki, Nagasaki
Moritate Construction	Accessibility	14	46	0.6	0.4	45°	2	1999	Fukuoka, Fukuoka
Mount Hiko, Mount Hiko Slope Car	Park	849	2,785	4.8	3.0	18°	80	2005	Soeda, Fukuoka
Muya Bus Stop, Sloppy	Diagonal elevator	161	528	9.6	6.0	5°40′	20	2002	Naruto, Tokushima
Mount Inasa (Inasa-yama), Nagasaki Inasa Mountain Slope Car[ja] English website	Park, Lookout, Observation Deck	521	1,709	4.8	3.0	21°	40	2020	Nagasaki, Nagasaki Prefecture
Nagasaki Subtropical Botanical Garden	Park	380	1,250	3.0	1.9	10°	20	1996	Nagasaki, Nagasaki
Nakadake Dam	Dam	125	410	1.8	1.1	35°	2	2006	Soo, Kagoshima
Nanakura Dam	Dam	96	315	2.1	1.3	45°	4	1993	Ōmachi, Nagano
Nanreku Shōken-yama Park	Park	203	666	6.0	3.7	11°30′	12	1990	Ainan, Ehime
Ogasayama Sports Park Ecopa	Park								Fukuroi, Shizuoka
Okuhagi Honjin Garden	Park	453	1,486	4.2	2.6	25°	24	1990	Hagi, Yamaguchi
Okutadami Dam	Dam	228	748	4.8	3.0	21°	40	1997	Uonuma, Niigata
Otaki Dam	Dam	101	331	2.7	1.7	50°	6	1997	Kawakami, Nara
Passage Kinkai Island Golf Club	Golf course	95	312	3.0	1.9	22°	5	1997	Nagasaki, Nagasaki
Rusutsu Resort	Ski resort	480	1,570	10.8	6.7	9°30′	36	1998	Rusutsu, Hokkaidō
Saga Sōgō Ground	Accessibility	8	26	0.9	0.6	35°	2	1999	Saga, Saga
Sakura-gō	Accessibility	50	160	0.9	0.6	33°	2	2003	Nagasaki, Nagasaki
Sanbōdai Schanze	Ski resort	145	476	5.4	3.4	28°	8	1997	Shibetsu, Hokkaidō
Sanda Onsen Kumano no Sato	Park	43	141	3.0	1.9	14°	8	2006	Sanda, Hyōgo
Sazanka Kōgen Pincnic Park, Kōgen Monorail	Park	402	1,319	6.0	3.7	17°	20	1995	Isahaya, Nagasaki
Sazanka Kōgen Pincnic Park, Kōgen Monorail	Park	280	920	6.0	3.7	14°	16	1993	Isahaya, Nagasaki
Shin Takasegawa Dam	Dam	102	335	2.1	1.3	30°	4	1996	Ōmachi, Nagano
Shirahama Mermaid Town	Accessibility	69	226	2.1	1.3	24°	4	2000	Shirahama, Wakayama
Shōkaien Care House Toyonosato	Accessibility	48	157	1.8	1.1	36°9′	16	2001	Mizumaki, Fukuoka
Siesta Patio	Park	213	699	4.8	3.0	16°	15	2000	Taku, Saga
Soeda Park, Sakura	Park	181	594	3.6	2.2	17°	16	1991	Soeda, Fukuoka
Sugiyama residence, Noboru-kun	Accessibility	20	66	1.5	0.9	28°	2	1996	Shizuoka, Shizuoka
Sun Village Akane	Ski resort	46	151	2.4	1.5	30°	12	1995	Iizuka, Fukuoka
Tachibana Thermal Power Plant	Accessibility	27	89	0.9	0.6	27°	2	2000	Anan, Tokushima
Takasakiyama Natural Zoological Garden	Park	250	820	3.6	2.2	9°30′	40	2003	Ōita, Ōita
Takasegawa Dam	Dam	104	341	2.1	1.3	45°	4	1994	Ōmachi, Nagano
Takayama Dam	Dam	72	236	1.5	0.9	42°	8	2006	Minamiyamashiro, Kyōto
Takeo Onsen Hoyōmura, Skybus Noboru-kun	Park	488	1,601	4.2	2.6	23°	16	1993	Takeo, Saga
Tenjin Dam	Dam	96	315	1.5	0.9	45°	2	1999	Miyakonojō, Miyazaki
Tenjin-kun	Accessibility	60	200	0.9	0.6	29°	2	2002	Nagasaki, Nagasaki
Tsunagi Onsen Shikisai	Park	56	184	2.1	1.3	32°30′	6	1994	Tsunagi, Kumamoto
Ueda Women's Junior College Tea House	Accessibility	58	190	2.4	1.5	22°	2	2005	Ueda, Nagano
Urayama Dam	Accessibility	216	709	2.7	1.7	45°	2	1998	Chichibu, Saitama
Wakato Hospital	Diagonal elevator	94	308	3.0	1.9	9°15′	4	1992	Kitakyūshū, Fukuoka
Watanabe residence	Accessibility	25	82	0.9	0.6	31°	2	1998	Minoo, Ōsaka
Wespa Tsubakiyama	Park	572	1,877	4.8	3.0	25°	40	2000. Ceased operation October 31, 2020.	Fukaura, Aomori
Yamano Hotel	Park	36	118	2.4	1.5	36°	6	2004	Takayama, Gifu
Yoichi Ski Jump	Ski resort	129	423	5.4	3.4	30°	8	1999	Yoichi, Hokkaidō
Zaō Ski Jump	Ski jump	200	660	5.4	3.4	35°	10	2001	Yamagata, Yamagata

=== South Korea ===
Facility, line name	Function	Diagonal line length (m)	Diagonal line length (ft)	Speed (km/h)	Speed (mph)	Maximum gradient	Passenger capacity	Opening year	Location
168 stairs Monorail	Accessibility	60	200	2.1	1.3	42°	8	2016	Choryang-dong, Dong District, Busan
Changwon Country Club	Golf course	60	200					1997	Changwon, Gyeongsangnam-do
Gohan-eup Monorail	Accessibility	206	676	3.53	2.19	16°	12	2009	Jeongseon, Gangwon-do
Haenam Ttangkkut	Park	8	26	0.9	0.6	26°50′		2005	Haenam, Jeollanam-do
Haenam Ttangkkut	Park	395	1,296	3.6	2.2	23°30′	40	2005	Haenam, Jeollanam-do
Hamyang Daebongsan monorail	Park	3,930	12,890					2020	Hamyang County
Hwaam Cave	Park	527	1,729	6.6	4.1	20°		2003	Jeongseon, Gangwon-do
Hwanseongul Cave	Park	600	2,000					2006	Samcheok, Gangwon-do
Kwangju Country Club	Golf course	70	230					2002	Gokseong, Jeollanam-do
Naengcheon Country Club	Golf course	110	360					2003	Daegu
Namgwangju Country Club	Golf course	40	130					2001	Hwasun, Jeollanam-do
Ulsan Country Club	Golf course	32	105	4.8	3.0	12°	6	2005	Ulsan
Ulsan Country Club	Golf course	135	443					1993	Ulsan
Yeongju-dong Oreumgil Monorail	Accessibility	70	230	3.6	2.2	20°	8	2014	Yeongju-dong, Jung District, Busan
Yong-in Country Club	Golf course	100	330					2001	Yongin, Gyeonggi-do
Yong-in Country Club	Golf course	78	256					2001	Yongin, Gyeonggi-do

== See also ==
- Funicular
- Monorail
- Monorails in Japan
- People mover
- Personal rapid transit
- Rack railway
- inclined elevator
