= Mount Hiko =

Mountain in Fukuoka Prefecture, Japan

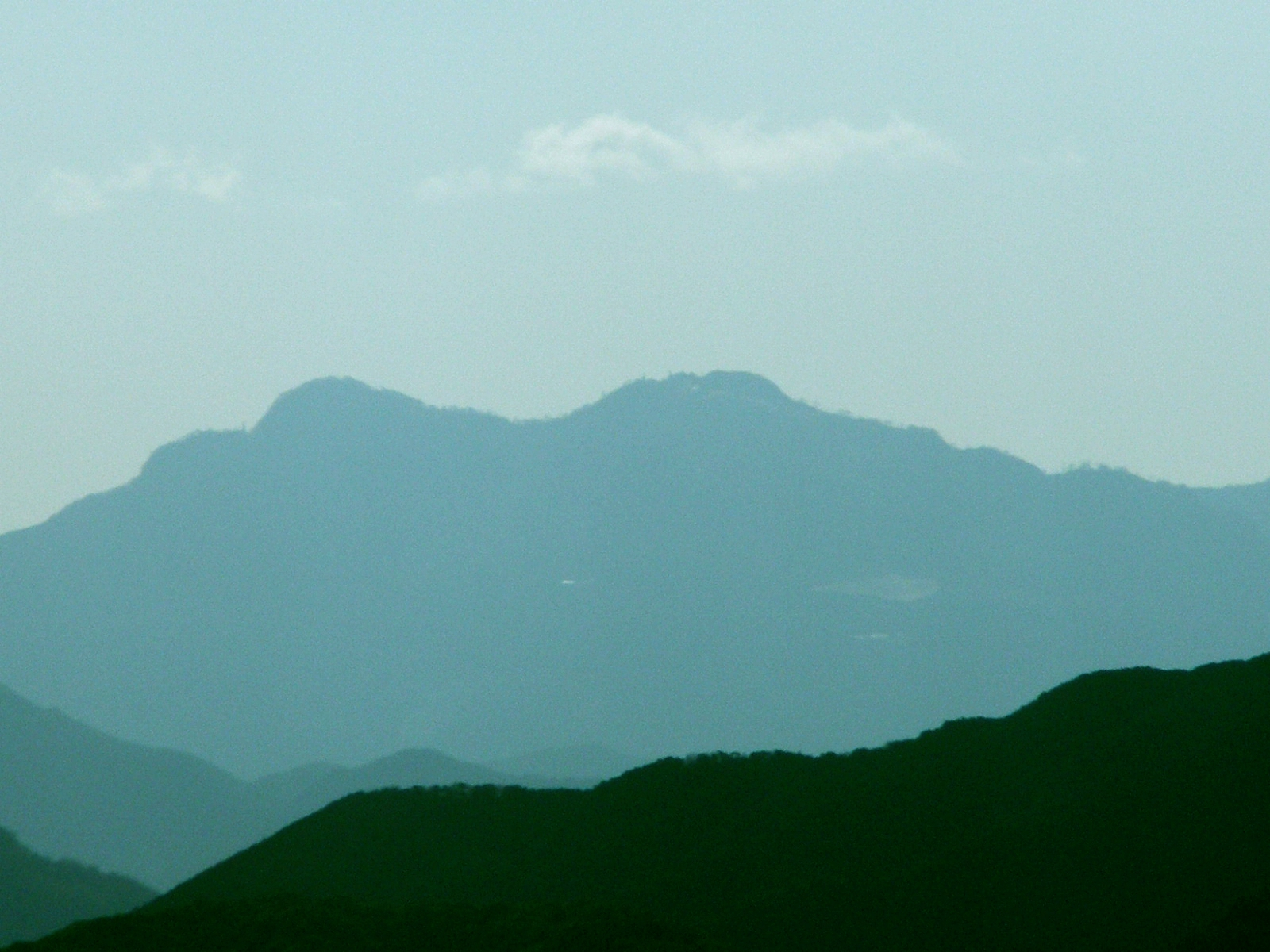
- A view of Mount Hiko from Mount Sarakura

Highest point
- Elevation: 1,199 m (3,934 ft)
- Coordinates: 33°28′35″N 130°55′33″E

Naming
- Native name: 英彦山 (Japanese)

Geography
- Location within Fukuoka Prefecture Location within Japan
- Country: Japan
- State: Fukuoka Prefecture
- Region: Kyushu

Climbing
- Easiest route: Slope car, Hiking
- National Historic Site of Japan

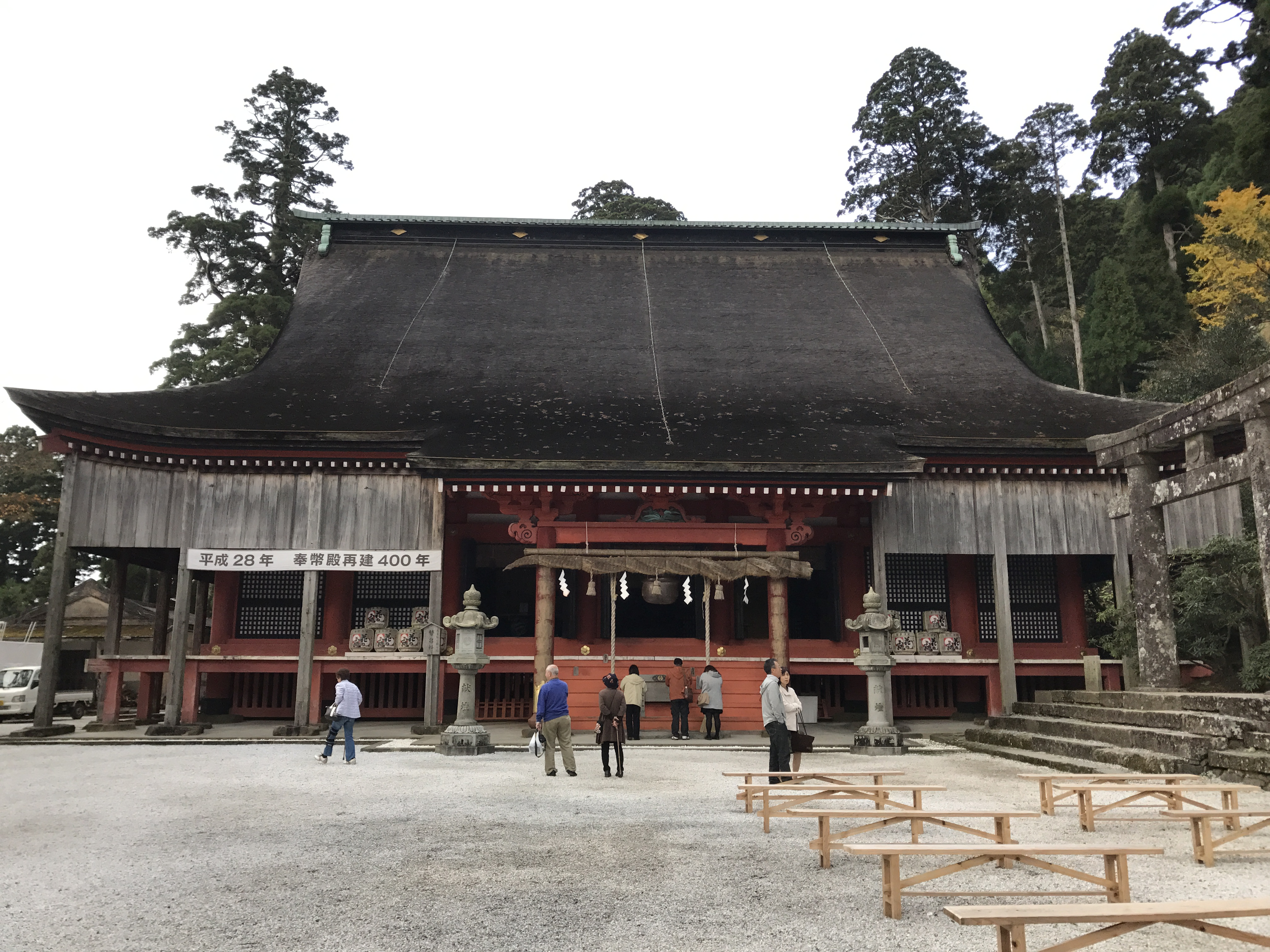
Hikosan Jingu

Mount Hiko (英彦山, Hiko-san), is a mountain on the border between Fukuoka Prefecture and Ōita Prefecture in Kyūshū, Japan. It straddles the municipalities of Soeda, Fukuoka and Nakatsu, Ōita, with its elevation of 1,199 metres (3,934 ft) metres within the borders of Nakatsu. The mountain is also within the borders of the Yaba-Hita-Hikosan Quasi-National Park. It is one of Japan's 100 Scenic Views and Japan's 200 Famous Mountains. It is also regarded as a sacred mountain and one of the three major centers for Shugendō. It was designated a National Historic Site in 2017.

== Overview ==
Mount Hiko is the third highest mountain in Fukuoka Prefecture, after Mount Shaka (1230 meters) on the border with Hita, Ōita, and Mount Gozendake (1209 meters) in Yame, Fukuoka. The mountain area is an area where the prefectural border between Fukuoka and Oita prefectures has not been determined. The name of the mountain was originally written "彦山", but the additional kanji of "英" was added in 1729 by order of Cloistered Emperor Reigen.

Hikosan Jingu is located about 720 meters, or halfway up the mountain, and is visited by many worshipers, with the upper shrine located at the top of the central peak. In October 2005, a slope car with a total length of 849 meters was built along the approach to Hikosan Jingu, making it possible to reach the shrine in about 15 minutes from the base of the mountains. Fukakura Gorge, located at the foot of the mountain, is a famous spot for autumn leaves.

Bronze, stone, and wooden toriis mark the entrances to successive sacred spaces on the main footpath from the Hikosan Jingu area to up the summit of Mount Hiko.

Otoko-iwa ("Male Rock"), a strange-shaped rock in Fukakuraenchi at the back of Fukakura Gorge, and Onna-iwa ("Female Rock"), which face each other across the valley, are connected by a giant shimenawa rope, and the Otoko-iwa Festival is held every November. Parts of the Hikoyama Gardens, including the former Kameishibo Garden, have been designated as National Place of Scenic Beauty.

== History ==
Mount Hiko has a long history of human settlement, as evidenced by the remains of hunting pits and settlements from the early to late Jōmon period in the Imagawa headwaters at the foot of the mountain. A large jade bead dating from the late Jomon period was also found, which is rare in Fukuoka Prefecture and was brought from Itoigawa, Niigata, about 1500 kilometers away in a straight line, indicating that active trade existed at the time.

Mount Hiko, along with Mount Haguro (Yamagata Prefecture) and Mount Ōmine (Nara Prefecture), is counted as one of the three great mountains for the Shugendō mountain cult which flourished especially in the Nara period and Heian period. Shugendō is a highly syncretic religion, a body of ascetic practices that evolved during the 7th century from an amalgamation of beliefs, philosophies, doctrines and ritual systems drawn from local folk-religious practices, Shinto mountain worship and Buddhism. The final purpose of Shugendō is for practitioners to find supernatural power and save themselves and the masses by conducting religious training while treading through steep mountain ranges. However, Mount Hiko became famous as a training ground for yamabushi, with a focus on the martial arts, and at its peak, it is said to have had thousands of warrior monks, a military force comparable to that of a feudal lord.

Historical records of Mount Hiko include Hikosan Ruki (彦山流記), which was written in 1213 AD, and Chinzei Hikosan Engi (鎮西彦山縁起), written in 1572 AD.

The Buzen Sasaki clan, which was based on this mountain, ruled as the feudal lord, and its chieftain also held the title of monk. In the Sengoku period the mountain came under attack by Ōtomo Sōrin in October 1581, and many of the temple buildings were burnt down in the battle that lasted for over a month. The Ōtomo also suffered a large number of deaths and lost much of their power; however, the Sasaki were also weakened and unable to resist Toyotomi Hideyoshi's invasion of Kyushu in 1586. Sasaki Kojirō, famous for his duel against Miyamoto Musashi, was a member of the Buzen Sasaki clan.

Shugendō gradually fell into decline during the Edo Period, and was banned by the Meiji government in 1870 with its Shinbutsu bunri edict separating Shinto from Buddhism, and many of the chapels and temples on the mountains reverted to forest and rice fields. Details about the yamabushi settlement were unknown, but in 2015, lidar surveying carried out by Soeda Town confirmed several locations that appeared to be the site of the village. The survey results suggest that there were up to 800 structures housing around 3,000 people at its height.

== Caves ==
The 1213 AD text Hikosan Ruki (彦山流記) lists 49 caves of Mount Hiko (英彦山四十九窟, Hiko-san Shijūku Kutsu) that were used by ascetics. Today, the best-known caves (窟, kutsu) are (listed in order from roughly a downhill/western to uphill/eastern direction):

- Fudō Cave (不動窟, Fudō Kutsu)
- Ōkawabe Cave (大河辺窟, Ōkawabe Kutsu)
- Futado Cave (双戸窟, Futado Kutsu)
- Monju Cave (文殊窟, Monju Kutsu)
- Chimuro Cave (智室窟, Chimuro Kutsu)
- Go Cave (五窟, Go Kutsu)
- Imakumano Cave (今熊野窟, Imakumano Kutsu)
- Tamaya Cave (玉屋窟, Tamaya Kutsu) (also known as Prajñā Cave (般若窟, Hannya Kutsu); this is the most important cave)
- Ōminami Cave (大南窟, Ōminami Kutsu)
- Buzen Cave (豊前窟, Buzen Kutsu)
- Bungo Cave (豊後窟, Bungo Kutsu)

== See also ==
- Hikosan Jingū
- List of Historic Sites of Japan (Fukuoka)
- Mount Kubote
- Rokugō Manzan
