= October 1915 =

Month of 1915

<<	October 1915					>>
Su	Mo	Tu	We	Th	Fr	Sa
					1	2
3	4	5	6	7	8	9
10	11	12	13	14	15	16
17	18	19	20	21	22	23
24	25	26	27	28	29	30
31

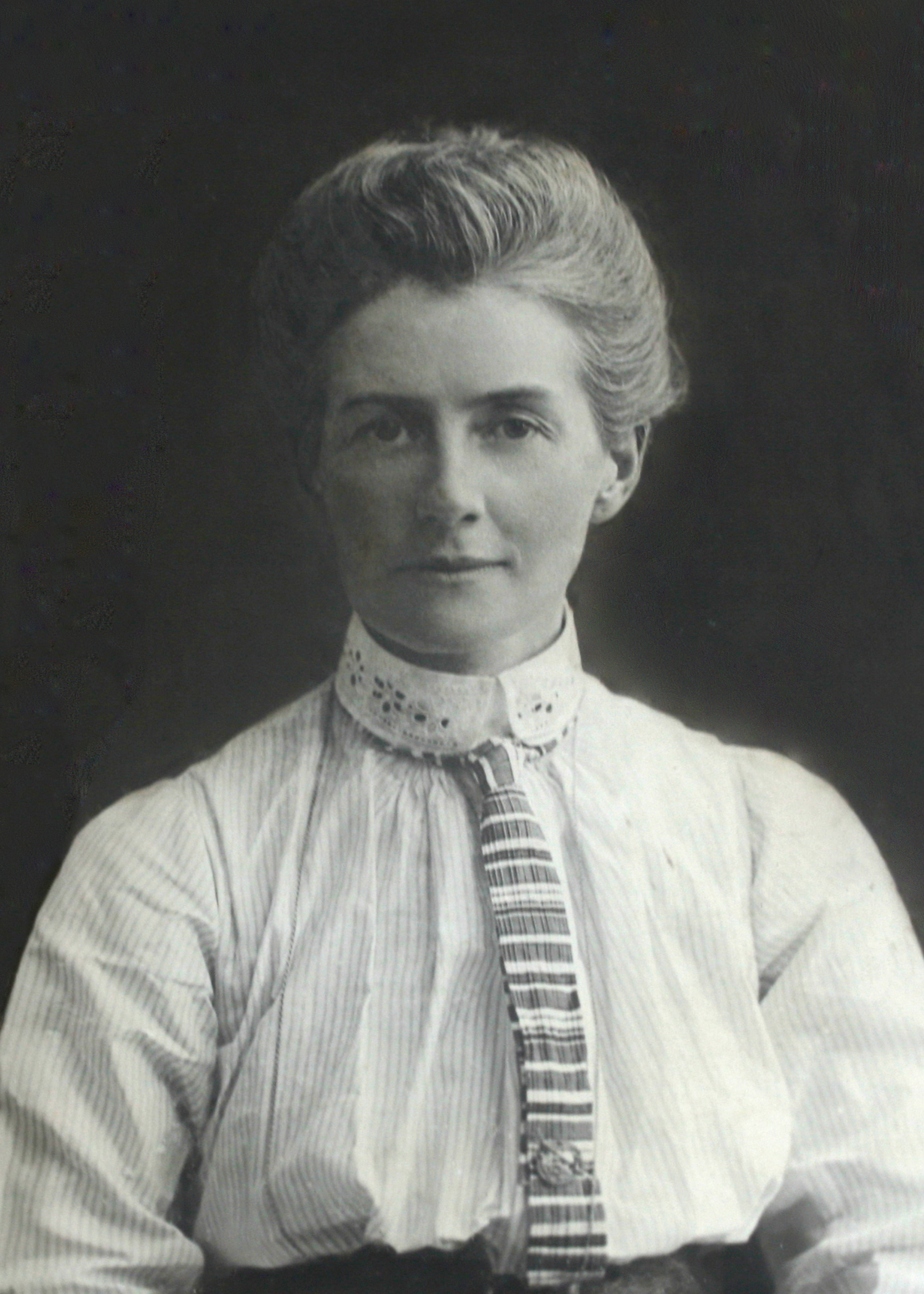
British nurse Edith Cavell is executed by the German Army.

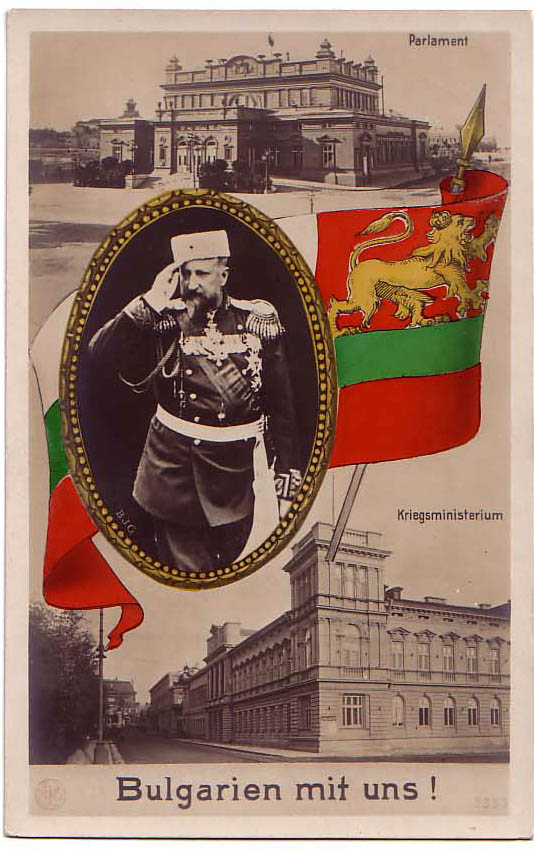
A German postcard commemorating the entry of Bulgaria into the war.

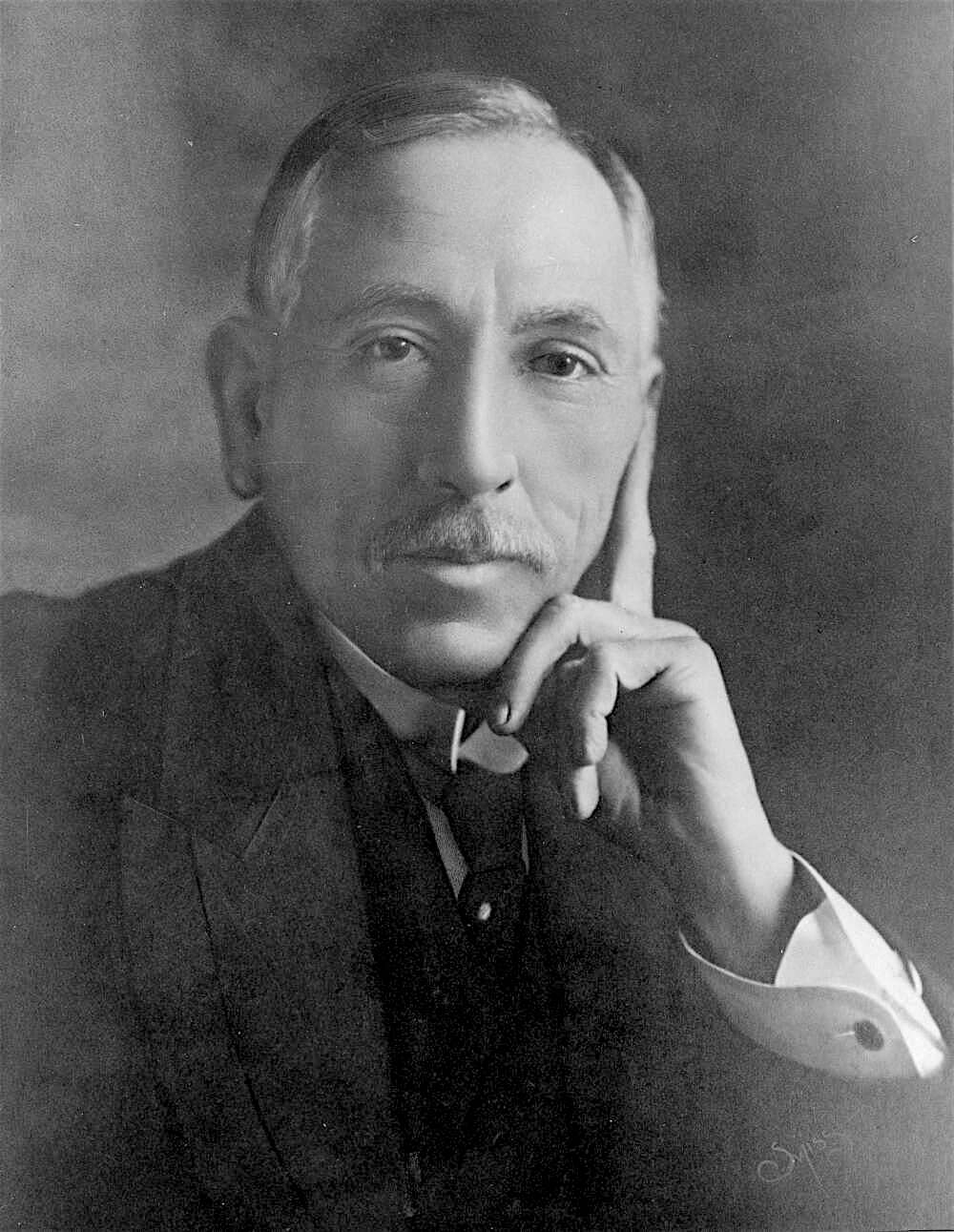
Billy Hughes, new Prime Minister of Australia.

The following events occurred in October 1915:

== October 1, 1915 (Friday) ==
- The US. District Court of Pennsylvania ruled the Motion Picture Patents Company, founded by Thomas Edison, violated the Sherman Antitrust Act.
- Broward County, Florida was established with its county seat in Fort Lauderdale.
- Henry Ford Hospital was officially opened to patients in Detroit, the first of several hospitals that could become part of the present-day Henry Ford Health System.
- Harcum College was founded as Harcum Post Graduate School in Philadelphia as a college-preparatory school for young women but quickly grew to enrolling both women and men for junior-level college courses within five years. The college now enrolls 1,600 students annually in two-year college programs.
- The Rankbach Railway opened for service between Renningen and Böblingen, Germany.
- The Vestfold rail line added a station to serve Tønsberg, Norway.
- Rail stations Holloway and Caledonian Road and Warren were closed in England as part of wartime measures.
- Franz Kafka's novella The Metamorphosis (Die Verwandlung) was first published in the German monthly magazine Die Weißen Blätter.
- Born: Jerome Bruner, American psychologist, developed the instructional scaffolding process in educational psychology; in New York City, United States (d. 2016)

== October 2, 1915 (Saturday) ==
- An earthquake with a magnitude of 6.8 struck Pleasant Valley in north-central Nevada, the strongest ever recorded in that state. Fortunately, the epicenter was in an isolated area, resulting in some building damage in nearby communities but no injuries.
- The soccer stadium Riggs Field was dedicated at Clemson University in Clemson, South Carolina. It is the home stadium for the Clemson Tigers.
- The American Civil War Ox Hill Battlefield Park was officially established when monuments were erected for Union Army generals Isaac Stevens and Philip Kearny, who were both killed in the Battle of Chantilly on September 1, 1862.
- Died: Lord Ninian Crichton-Stuart, 32, British politician and army officer, commander of the Welch Regiment; killed in action during the Battle of Loos (b. 1883)

== October 3, 1915 (Sunday) ==
- Second Battle of Champagne — French General Joseph Joffre suspended the offensive to break the German line at Champagne, France and ordered a battle of attrition that lasted five weeks.
- Actions of the Hohenzollern Redoubt — German forces successfully recaptured most of the lost ground on Hohenzollern Redoubt from the British. The area was an important defensive position for the Germans on the Western Front.
- Japanese battleships Kongō and Hiei shelled and sunk the crippled Imperial Japanese Navy ship Iki (formally the Russian battleship Imperator Nikolai I which the Japanese captured in 1905). Iki had been inoperative as a vessel after it bad been struck on May 1.
- Born: Ray Stark, American filmmaker, producer of films including West Side Story, The Misfits, and Funny Girl, recipient of the Irving G. Thalberg Memorial Award; as Raymond Stark, in New York City, United States (d. 2004)

== October 4, 1915 (Monday) ==
- The Dinosaur National Monument was established in the Uinta Mountains that border between Colorado and Utah to protect some 800 sites in that area.
- The Arrowrock Dam was dedicated and opened for operation on the Boise River in Idaho. At 350 feet (110 m), it was the tallest dam in the world and would hold the record for nine years until the completion of the Schräh dam in Switzerland in 1924, which had a height of 111.6 m (366 ft).
- Born:
  - Beverly Loraine Greene, American architect, first African American woman licensed as an architect in the United States, noted works include the 1956 UNESCO United Nations Headquarters in Paris; in Chicago, United States (d. 1957)
  - Silvina Bullrich, Argentine writer, author of Bodas de cristal and other fiction and non-fiction; in Pilar, Buenos Aires, Argentina (d. 1990)
  - William Hawrelak, Canadian politician, 24th Mayor of Edmonton; in Shandro, Alberta, Canada (d. 1975)
- Died:
  - Karl Staaff, 55, Swedish state leader, 11th Prime Minister of Sweden; died of pneumonia (b. 1860)
  - George Edwardes, 59, English theater producer, managed the Gaiety Theatre, Daly's Theatre, and Adelphi Theatre in London (b. 1855)
  - John Rigby, 71-72, grandfather of Eleanor Rigby, to whom Paul McCartney attributes a subconscious influence on naming the song with the same name (b. 1843)

== October 5, 1915 (Tuesday) ==
- The first annual Hopkinton State Fair was held in Contoocook, New Hampshire, earning a net profit of $5 over two days. It became one of New England's most famous fair events and the largest in New Hampshire. The fair expanded to three days in 1921 and in 1980 was scheduled to fall on Labor Day weekend.

== October 6, 1915 (Wednesday) ==
- Combined Austro-Hungarian and German Central Powers, reinforced by the recently joined Bulgaria launched a new offensive against Serbia under command of August von Mackensen.
- Born: Humberto Sousa Medeiros, Portuguese American clergy, Archbishop of Boston from 1970 to 1983; in Arrifes, São Miguel Island, Azores (d. 1983)

== October 7, 1915 (Thursday) ==
- The Central Powers launched a second invasion of Serbia.
- A massive fire destroyed the Chinatown in Walnut Grove, California, forcing many of the Chinese immigrants to relocate to Locke, California, an unincorporated town in the Sacramento–San Joaquin River Delta.
- The British Army established the 121st Brigade.
- The Tennessee Ornithological Society was founded in Nashville, Tennessee.
- Born: Walter Keane, American painter and plagiarist, plagiarized the work of his wife Margaret Keane; in Lincoln, Nebraska, United States (d. 2000)

== October 8, 1915 (Friday) ==
- Actions of the Hohenzollern Redoubt — Five German regiments attempted to recapture the remaining ground around Hohenzollern Redoubt from the British, but foggy conditions and inaccurate artillery barrages proved inadequate in forcing defending British and French troops from giving up their positions. The Germans suffered 3,000 casualties.
- Battle of Loos - Apart from continued fighting at Hohenzollern Redoubt, the overall British offense faltered due to lack of ammunition, equipment and fresh reinforcements to replenish exhausted units. The British suffered 59,247 casualties, the most of any battle they fought on the Western Front that year. The Germans suffered 51,100 casualties.
- The No. 26 Squadron of the Royal Flying Corps was established in Netheravon, England from personnel of the South African Air Corps.
- British destroyer HMS Mary Rose was launched by Swan Hunter at Wallsend, England. It would be sunk two years later by German naval ships.
- A rail station was opened in Salfords, England to serve the Brighton Main Line.
- The Dothan Opera House opened in Dothan, Alabama. It was listed in the National Register of Historic Places in 1977.
- Died: E. Phillips Fox, 50, Australian painter, member of the Heidelberg School which promoted impressionism in Australia; died of cancer (b. 1865)

== October 9, 1915 (Saturday) ==
- The Central Powers captured Belgrade.
- Second Battle of Jaunde — French and British forces began a second campaign to capture the German colonial capital of Jaunde in German Cameroon.
- The British Army established the 67th, 68th, and 70th Siege Batteries of the Royal Garrison Artillery.
- British destroyer HMS Nestor was launched by the Fairfield Shipbuilding and Engineering Company in Govan, Scotland to serve with the Grand Fleet. She was sunk during the Battle of Jutland the following year.
- British naval ship HMS Moth was launched by the Sunderland Shipbuilding Company in Sunderland, England, and was used for naval operations in the Middle East throughout World War I.
- Schoellkopf Field opened at Cornell University in Ithaca, New York. The playing field was named after the late Henry Schoellkopf, football player and head coach for the Cornell Big Red football team.
- Australian poet C. J. Dennis's verse novel The Songs of a Sentimental Bloke was published in book form in Sydney. It originally appeared in serial form in the magazine The Bulletin between 1909 and 1915.
- Born:
  - Vivian Della Chiesa, American opera singer, known for her collaborations with the Chicago Opera Company and Chicago City Opera Company, as well as her various radio specials including the NBC Symphony Orchestra; in Chicago, United States (d. 2009)
  - Henner Henkel, German tennis player, men's singles winner of the 1937 French Championships; as Heinrich Ernst Otto Henkel, in Posen, German Empire (present-day Poznań, Poland) (d. 1942)

== October 10, 1915 (Sunday) ==
- Twenty-six men left Gilgandra, New South Wales on the Cooee March; the first of the Snowball marches conducted to recruit more men for military service during World War I. At each town on the route they shouted "cooee" to attract recruits; the march arrived in Sydney on November 12 with 263 recruits.
- The German Club in Sydney, Australia was targeted by anti-German sentiment when an editorial in The Mirror of Australia reported that the German club was being used to house Germans who had been rejected from other hotels within the city: "Why should the members of these institutions be permitted the slightest consideration whilst their countrymen are committing outrages in the highways and byways of Europe?"
- Odds beat Kvik Halden 2-1 in the final of the Norwegian Football Cup in front of a crowd of 6,000 spectators at Sarpsborg Stadion in Sarpsborg, Norway.
- Born: Sardarilal Mathradas Nanda, Indian naval officer, 8th Chief of the Naval Staff; in Manora, Punjab Province, British India (present-day Manora, Karachi, Pakistan) (d. 2009)
- Died: Albert Cashier, Irish-born American soldier, fought with the Union Army during the American Civil War, assigned female at birth, he enlisted into the military as a man and maintained his male identity until his death (b. 1843)

== October 11, 1915 (Monday) ==
- Gallipoli campaign — With Allied and Ottoman forces at a stalemate in Gallipoli, the commanding officer staff began discussion of evacuating troops from the beachheads.
- The second Neutral Socialist Conference was held in Copenhagen for the socialist parties active in the Scandinavian countries.
- The No. 31 Squadron of the Royal Flying Corps was established in Farnborough, Hampshire, England.
- Metamora Township High School was opened for public students in Metamora, Illinois.
- Died:
  - Abigail Scott Duniway, 80, American political activist, major leader of women's suffrage in the United States (b. 1834)
  - Paul Eyschen, 74, Luxembourgian state leader, 8th Prime Minister of Luxembourg (b. 1841)

== October 12, 1915 (Tuesday) ==
- British nurse Edith Cavell was executed by a German firing squad for helping Allied soldiers escape from Belgium.
- Mathias Mongenast became the 9th Prime Minister of Luxembourg after Paul Eyschen died in office. His term would be short, covering 25 days before he was succeeded by Hubert Loutsch.
- A rail station was opened in Grafton, New South Wales to serve the North Coast line in Australia.

== October 13, 1915 (Wednesday) ==
- Actions of the Hohenzollern Redoubt — British forces made one final attack to regain Hohenzollern Redoubt but did not have enough hand grenades to destroy all German defensive positions, resulting in 3,643 casualties for the British.
- After a five-week hiatus, German airships resumed raids against Great Britain, as five German Navy Zeppelins attempted to bomb London. Royal Flying Corps pilot John Slessor, flying a B.E.2 aircraft, intercepted one of the airships over London, becoming the first airman to do so over England. However, the other four Zeppelins scattered their bombs over various towns and the countryside, killing 71 people and injuring 128 in one of the deadliest airship attacks in World War I.
- The Boston Red Sox defeated the Philadelphia Phillies to win the World Series by four games to one.
- The association football club Sölvesborgs was established in Sölvesborg, Sweden.
- The first edition of the Yiddish daily newspaper Flugblat was published in Vilna, Lithuania.
- Born:
  - Frederick Rosier, British air force officer, commander of the No. 229 Squadron during World War II and Fighter Command from 1966 to 1968, recipient of the Order of the Bath, Order of the British Empire, Order of Orange-Nassau and Distinguished Service Order; in Wrexham, Wales (d. 1998)
  - Bram van der Stok, Dutch air force officer, member of the Royal Netherlands Air Force and the escape team from German POW camp Stalag Luft III during World War II, recipient of the Order of Orange-Nassau, Order of the British Empire, Bronze Lion, and Bronze Cross; as Abraham Lamertus van der Stok, in Sumatra, Dutch East Indies (present-day Indonesia) (d. 1993)
- Died: Charles Sorley, 20, British poet, author of the poetry collection Marlborough and Other Poems; killed in action during the Battle of Loos (b. 1895)

== October 14, 1915 (Thursday) ==
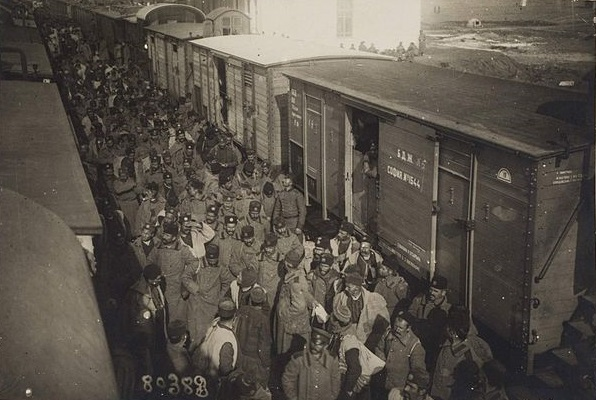
Bulgarian soldiers board at a train station in Sofia for the front.

- Bulgaria officially entered World War I by allying with Austria-Hungary and Germany and declaring war on Serbia.
- Morava Offensive — The Bulgarian First Army of 195,620 soldiers under command of Lieutenant General Kliment Boyadzhiev attempted to break through the Serbian line from Leskovac to Negotin, Serbia, held by an estimated 90,000 troops with the Second Serbian Army.
- Ovče Pole Offensive — The Bulgarian Second Army of 100,247 soldiers under the command of Lieutenant General Georgi Todorov attempted to capture the Vardar river valley in Macedonia (then under Serbian control) to cut off the vital railway linking Skopje with Thessaloniki to prevent the Serbian Army from being resupplied and reinforced by the Allies.
- The Imperial Russian Navy Black Sea Fleet raided Varna, Bulgaria, employing a seaplane carrier-battleship force.
- The Caledonian Curling Club was established in Regina, Saskatchewan.
- Fraternal Day was established as a state holiday in Alabama.
- Born: Louise Shadduck, American journalist and politician, first woman to serve in cabinet at state level, president of the National Federation of Press Women from 1971 to 1973; in Coeur d'Alene, Idaho, United States (d. 2008)
- Died: Rodolfo Fierro, 29-30, Mexican revolutionary leader, deputy commander under Pancho Villa and the División del Norte during the Mexican Revolution; died after being thrown off of his horse into quicksand (b. 1880)

== October 15, 1915 (Friday) ==
- Great Britain and Montenegro declared war on Bulgaria. The British then dispatched a field army to the Macedonian front in the Balkans.
- Battle of Krivolak — To counter the Central Powers invasion into Serbia, French and British forces under joint command of French General Maurice Sarrail and British General Bryan Mahon were mobilized from Salonika in Serbian-controlled Macedonia.
- Gallipoli Campaign — General Ian Hamilton was relieved of command of Allied forces on Gallipoli.
- Orville Wright sold the Wright Company, which he had founded in 1909 with his late brother Wilbur, to a group of New York City investors.
- The Mitsui Electric Tramway company extended the Nishitetsu Amagi Line in the Fukuoka Prefecture, Japan with stations Gorōmaru, Gakkōmae, Koganchaya and Kitano serving the line.
- Detective Story Magazine was first published by Street & Smith of New York as a successor to Nick Carter Stories.
- Born: Hassan Gouled Aptidon, Djiboutian state leader, first President of Djibouti; in Lughaya, British Somaliland (present-day Somaliland) (d. 2006)
- Died: Lucy Lambert Hale, 74, American socialite, daughter of U.S. Senator John P. Hale, notoriously connected to presidential assassin John Wilkes Booth (b. 1841)

== October 16, 1915 (Saturday) ==
- France declared war on Bulgaria.
- Battle of Krivolak — French forces occupied the Gevgelija and Strumica rail stations in Serbian-controlled Vardar Macedonia.
- The St Faith's Church was established in Nottingham, England.
- Born:
  - Nancy Bird Walton, Australian aviator, founder of the Australian Women Pilots' Association; as Nancy Bird, in Kew, New South Wales, Australia (d. 2009)
  - Alan Hodge, English historian and journalist, co-founder of the magazine History Today, co-author with Robert Graves of The Long Week-End and assistant editor of Winston Churchill's A History of the English-Speaking Peoples; in Scarborough, North Yorkshire, England (d. 1979)

== October 17, 1915 (Sunday) ==
- Prince Leopold Clement, heir to the House of Saxe-Coburg and Gotha-Koháry in Austria-Hungary, met his mistress Camilla Rybicka to formally end their affair and to write her a cheque for 4 million Austro-Hungarian krones as compensation, since his father Prince Philipp would never honor a marital union nor allow Rybicka any inheritance to the family fortune. Unknown to Leopold, Rybicka had armed herself with a revolver and a bottle of sulfuric acid, intending to kill him and take her own life. She shot him five times and then smashed the bottle of acid in his face, resulting him losing an eye. She then shot herself. Leopold did not die immediately, but suffered from disfiguring injuries until he succumbed and died the following April. The murder-suicide was the biggest royal scandal for Austro-Hungarian royalty since the Mayerling incident in 1889.
- Born:
  - Arthur Miller, American playwright, author of Death of a Salesman and The Crucible, recipient of the Pulitzer Prize, third husband to Marilyn Monroe; in New York City, United States (d. 2005)
  - Mike Sandlock, American baseball player, catcher for the Boston Braves, Brooklyn Dodgers and Pittsburgh Pirates from 1942 to 1953; in Old Greenwich, Connecticut, United States (d. 2016)
  - Ba Swe, Burmese state leader, second Prime Minister of Burma; in Tavoy, British Burma (present-day Dawei, Myanmar) (d. 1987)

== October 18, 1915 (Monday) ==
- Third Battle of the Isonzo — Italy launched attacks to capture bridgeheads at Bovec and Tolmin along the Isonzo River (now Soča) in Austria-Hungary (now part of Slovenia).
- The Government General of Warsaw was established to govern German-occupied Vistula Land of Poland that was formerly part of the Russian Empire.
- Vaudeville star Valeska Suratt made her film debut in the crime drama The Soul of Broadway, directed by Herbert Brenon and released through Fox Film. It was the first of 11 pictures she did, showcasing her as the "vamp". Supposedly in the film Suratt wore 150 gowns, which reportedly drove the film's budget up to $25,000. The film, along with all her others, were destroyed in 1937 when the Fox Film storage facility in New Jersey caught fire.
- The Scottish Rite, a Freemasonry organization, dedicated the House of the Temple, designed by architect John Russell Pope, in Washington D.C. as the official headquarters of the Southern Jurisdiction of the United States.
- The short story "The Little Governess" by Katherine Mansfield was published in the literary magazine Signature under the pen name of Matilda Berry, and later reprinted in Bliss and Other Stories.
- Born: Thomas Round, British opera singer, best known for his collaboration with the D'Oyly Carte Opera Company from 1946 to 1949 and 1958 to 1964; in Barrow-in-Furness, England (d. 2016)

== October 19, 1915 (Tuesday) ==
- Russia and Italy declared war on Bulgaria.
- Mexican Revolution — The United States recognized the Mexican government of Venustiano Carranza as the de facto regime.
- Mexican border raiders boarded a train north of Brownsville, Texas and shot several white passengers dead while sparing those who were of Mexican ancestry. A law posse later arrested four Mexicans suspected to be raiders and executed them.
- The classic thriller The Thirty-Nine Steps by John Buchan was first published in book form by William Blackwood and Sons in Edinburgh, after appearing as a serial in Blackwood's Magazine. The novel marked the first appearance of British spy Richard Hannay and became a very popular novel for soldiers to read in the trenches.
- Died:
  - Neil McLeod, 72, Canadian politician, 5th Premier of Prince Edward Island (b. 1842)
  - Joseph McCoy, 77, American cattle breeder, promoted the transport of Texas Longhorn from Texas to the eastern United States (b. 1837)

== October 20, 1915 (Wednesday) ==
- General elections were held in South Africa with Louis Botha of the South African Party winning the majority but with fewer seats in the House of Assembly of South Africa than in the previous election.
- Battle of Krivolak — French forces reached the town of Krivolak on the Vardar river in Vardar Macedonia, while the British positioned defenses at a mountain pass near Kosturino and Doiran Lake.
- The Ottoman formally quelled Armenian resistance in Urfa, Turkey.
- Women in the British Commonwealth were officially permitted to act as bus and tram conductors for the duration of World War I, although many had been employed in Glasgow and other cities since April.
- The Swedish Army established the Swedish Infantry Officers' College in Karlsborg, Sweden.

== October 21, 1915 (Thursday) ==
- Parliamentary elections were held in Norway with a second round of voting held from November 4 to 11.
- Battle of Krivolak — A Bulgarian regiment marching from Bulgarian-controlled Strumica towards the Strumica rail station in Serbian territory unexpectedly encountered occupying French forces and were repulsed.
- Ojo de Agua Raid — The United States Army and the Mexican Seditionistas clashed for a final time at the border town of Ojo de Agua, Texas. A team of 22 U.S. cavalrymen and eight infantry barricaded in a single building and fought off a mounted Mexican unit between 25 and 100 men before reinforcements arrived. The Americans sustained 12 casualties, with 4 killed and 8 wounded. The Mexican force had 7 killed and at least 9 wounded. The battle ended further attempts of the Plan of San Diego to disrupt the border area as the U.S. Government sent large groups of soldiers into Texas to discourage further border attacks.
- The United Daughters of the Confederacy (UDC) held their first annual meeting outside the Southern United States, in San Francisco. Historian General of the UDC, Mildred Lewis Rutherford addressed the gathering on the "Historical Sins of Omission & Commission" of "Yankee" historians.

== October 22, 1915 (Friday) ==
- Second Battle of Champagne — French General Joseph Joffre declared a "moral victory" by inflicting major casualties on the German lines and exhausting defending units, even though no strategic objectives were reach due to lack of artillery. Joffre ordered a base level of offensive operations to keep the Germans reallocating military resources to the Eastern Front while a new strategy was formulated.
- Bulgarian forces crossed the South Morava River and near Vranje, Serbia and cut off the Serbian Army from the rest of the Allied forces in the south near the Greek border.
- The association football club Luleå was established in Luleå, Sweden.
- Born:
  - Yitzhak Shamir, Russian-Israeli politician, 7th Prime Minister of Israel; as Yitzhak Yezernitsky, in Ruzhinoy, Russian Empire (present-day Ruzhany, Belarus) (d. 2012)
  - Jean Despeaux, French boxer, gold medalist at the 1936 Summer Olympics; in France (d. 1989)

== October 23, 1915 (Saturday) ==
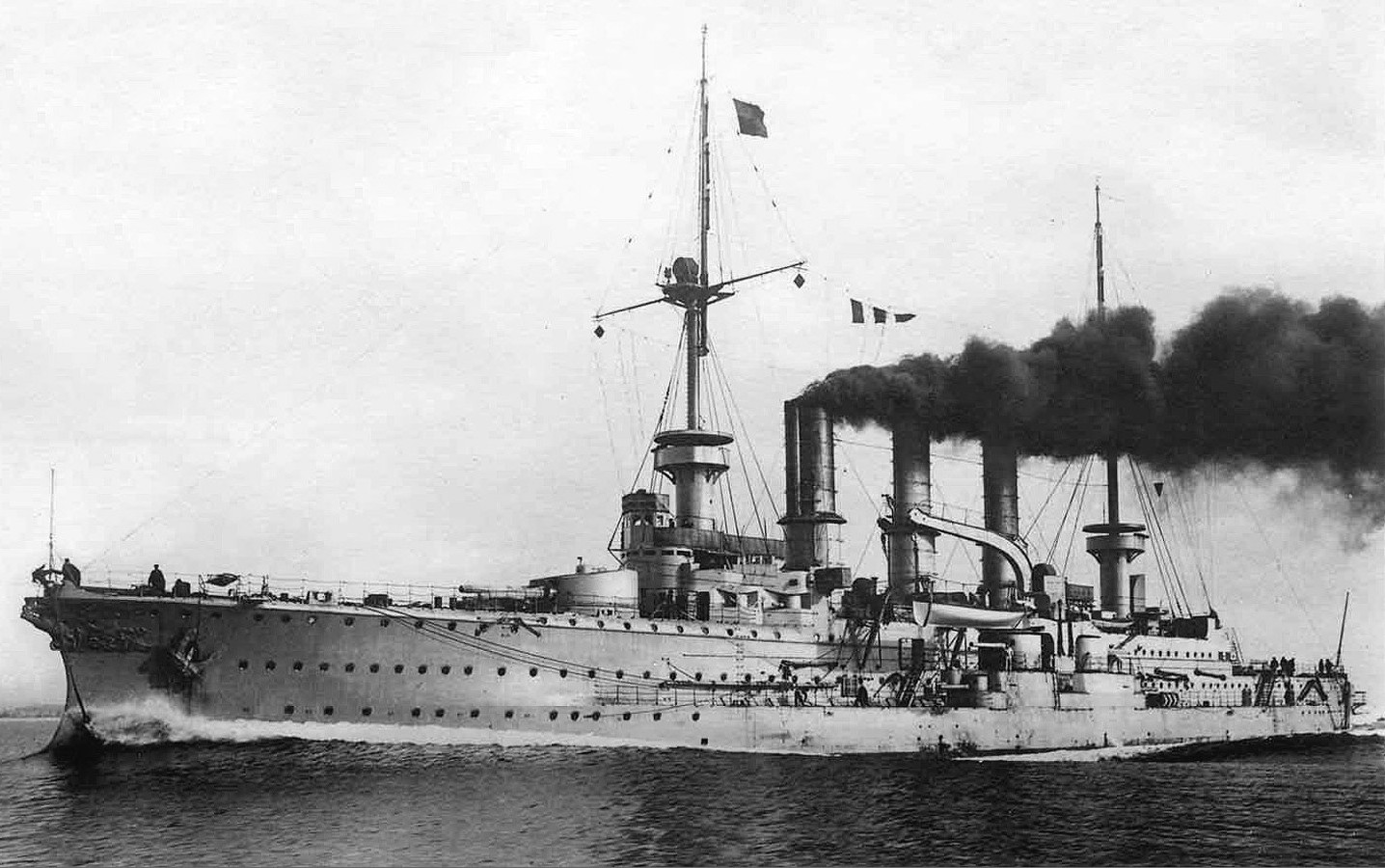
SMS Prinz Adalbert

- Torpedoing of the armored cruiser SMS Prinz Adalbert resulted in only three men being rescued from a crew of 675, the greatest single loss of life for the Imperial German Navy in the Baltic Sea during World War I.
- British troopship Marquette was torpedoed and sunk in the Aegean Sea 36 nautical miles (67 km) south of Salonica, Greece by German submarine SM U-35 with the loss of 167 lives.
- Parkway Theatre in Baltimore opened as a movie house with a screening of Zaza starring Pauline Frederick. It closed in 1978 but Johns Hopkins University restored and reopened the theater in 2017.
- Born: Józef Kuraś, Polish army officer, member of the Home Army and Bataliony Chłopskie during the occupation of Poland in World War II; in Waksmund, Poland (killed in action, 1947)
- Died: W. G. Grace, 67, English cricketer, all-rounder for the England cricket team 1880 to 1899, and clubs Marylebone, Gloucestershire and London County; died of a heart attack (b. 1848)

== October 24, 1915 (Sunday) ==
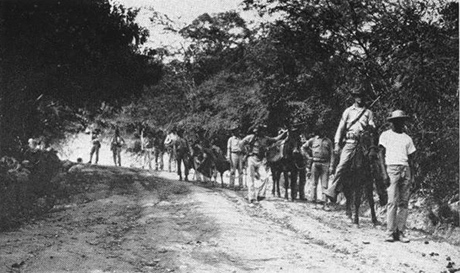
U.S. Marines patrolling the jungle around Haiti in 1915.

- Morava Offensive — The Bulgarian First Army managed to break through the Serbian line at Pirot in southeastern Serbia, forcing defending forces to retreat to the Timok Valley. The Bulgarians seized Veles and Kumanovo, cutting off the retreating Serbs from French allies.
- Henry McMahon, British High Commissioner of Egypt sent a letter to Hussein bin Ali, Sharif of Mecca confirming there was general British support to the Arab leader's early request to aide an Arab revolt against the Ottoman Empire and creating an independent Arab state.
- Battle of Fort Dipitie — A force of 400 rebel Haitians attacked a U.S. Marine patrol of 41 men under command of Smedley Butler, resulting in an overnight gun battle where the Marines' superior marksmanship kept the smaller group from being overrun. As a result, Butler was awarded the Medal of Honor along with Daniel Daly, a previous Medal of Honor recipient for action during the Boxer Rebellion, and officers Edward Albert Ostermann and William P. Upshur (four of the six Medal of Honor awards given during the United States occupation of Haiti).
- Imperial Trans-Antarctic Expedition — After a month being surrounded by ice on all sides, the hull of the polar exploration ship Endurance was breached on the starboard side and water poured in. The crew transferred supplies and three lifeboats onto the ice while others tried to pump water out of the hull.
- A naval bombardment by Austro-Hungarian forces destroyed Giovanni Battista Tiepolo's frescos, Translation of the House of Loreto, in the Church of the Scalzi in Venice.
- Laois beat Cork 6-2 and 4-1 respectively in the All-Ireland Senior Hurling Championship Final in Croke Park, Dublin.
- Born:
  - Bob Kane, American comic book artist and writer, creator of Batman; as Robert Kahn, in New York City, United States (d. 1998)
  - Gustav Rödel, German air force pilot, commander of Jagdgeschwader 27 for the Luftwaffe during World War II, recipient of the Knight's Cross of the Iron Cross; in Merseburg, German Empire (present-day Germany) (d. 1995)
  - Chet Adams, American football player, tackle for the Cleveland Rams and Cleveland Browns from 1939 to 1948; as Chester Frank Adams, in Cleveland, United States (d. 1990)
  - Letitia Woods Brown, American historian, specialist on African American history in Washington, D.C.; as Letitia Christine Woods, in Tuskegee, Alabama, United States (d. 1976)

== October 25, 1915 (Monday) ==
- Battle of Fort Dipitie — U.S. Marines captured a major rebel stronghold in Haiti. The rebels sustained 75 casualties while only one Marine was wounded.
- British destroyer HMS Velox struck a mine and sank in the English Channel with the loss of four of her crew.
- The Australian Mining Corps of the Royal Australian Engineers was established.
- Lyda Conley became the first American Indian woman to appear before the Supreme Court of the United States as a lawyer.
- The Belgium monarchy created the military decoration Croix de guerre for combatant showing bravery or virtue on the battlefield during World War I.
- The Independent Presbyterian Church was established in Birmingham, Alabama.
- Born: Tommy Prince, Indigenous Canadian soldier, member of the First Special Service Force, recipient of the Military Medal and Silver Star, making him the most decorated soldier of Indigenous background in World War II; as Thomas George Prince, in Brokenhead Ojibway Nation, Manitoba, Canada (d. 1977)
- Died: Jim Martin, 14, Australian soldier, youngest Australian to die in World War I during the Gallipoli campaign; died from complications of typhoid fever (b. 1901)

== October 26, 1915 (Tuesday) ==
- Bulgarian troops executed 120 sick or wounded Serbian soldiers held in custody at a town hospital in Štip, Serbia under order of Bulgarian commander Aleksandar Protogerov.
- A German delegation met with Habibullah Khan, Emir of Afghanistan, in Kabul to discuss the country gaining independence from the British Empire by siding with the Central Powers in World War I. Despite cordial meetings, Afghanistan chose to remain neutral.
- The prototype for the Siemens-Schuckert R.II airplane was first flown in Berlin but mechanical and design issues prevented it from being put into military service.
- Died: August Bungert, 70, German composer and poet, known for major works such as the operas Aurora and the four-part epic Homerische Welt (b. 1845)

== October 27, 1915 (Wednesday) ==
- Billy Hughes became the 7th Prime Minister of Australia and the first to serve consecutive terms in office.
- Battle of Krivolak — French forces in Vardar Macedonia established a bridgehead around Karahojali east of the Vardar River, covering a 15 miles (24 km) line between the towns of Gradec and Krivolak.
- Imperial Trans-Antarctic Expedition — Despite best efforts of the crew to repair and hull and pump water out of the polar exploration ship Endurance, expedition leader Ernest Shackleton declared the ship too far gone to save and ordered the crew to abandon it.
- The town of Seal Beach, California was incorporated.
- Born: Harry Saltzman, Canadian-British film-maker, co-produced with Albert R. Broccoli the James Bond films in 1960s and 1970s; as Herschel Saltzman, in Sherbrooke, Quebec, Canada (d. 1994)
- Died: John C. Moore, 81-85, American politician, first Mayor of Denver (b. 1830)

== October 28, 1915 (Thursday) ==
- Royal Navy ship SS Sarnia accidentally ran into one of its one minesweeper ships in the Dardanelles, killing 154 crewmen.
- Gallipoli campaign — Lieutenant General Charles Monro arrived at Gallipoli to take charge of the campaign.
- A fire at St. John's School in Peabody, Massachusetts claimed the lives of 21 girls between the ages of 7 and 17.
- British cruiser HMS Argyll cruiser ran aground on Inchcape, Angus, Scotland and was wrecked.
- The Mikawa Railway extended the Mikawa Line in the Aichi Prefecture, Japan with station Chiryū serving the line.
- Richard Strauss's symphonic poem An Alpine Symphony (Eine Alpensinfonie) premiered at the Dresden Hofkapelle in Berlin, with Strauss conducting.
- Died: Fowell Buxton, 78, Australian politician, 13th Governor of South Australia (b. 1837)

== October 29, 1915 (Friday) ==
- Media companies Vitagraph Studios and the Hearst Corporation partnered to form Hearst-Vitagraph News Pictorial, which provided newsreels and animated shorts for movie theaters. It was only in business for a short time and folded within a year.
- The association football club Montagnana was established in Montagnana, Italy.
- Born: Vermont Garrison, American air force officer, commander of the 8th Fighter Wing during the Korean War, seven-time recipient of the Distinguished Flying Cross, three-time recipient of the Bronze Star Medal, two-time recipient of Silver Star and Legion of Merit, and the Distinguished Service Cross; in Pulaski County, Kentucky, United States (d. 1994)
- Died: John Wolcott Stewart, 89, American politician, 33rd Governor of Vermont (b. 1825)

== October 30, 1915 (Saturday) ==
- The French submarine Turquoise was captured by the Ottoman Empire, allowing them to gain valuable intelligence of Allied operations in the region.
- Imperial Trans-Antarctic Expedition — With the polar exploration ship Endurance now sinking, expedition leader Ernest Shackleton ordered the crew to make a march towards Paulet Island, which he calculated was 346 miles (557 km) from the wreck, where a food depot from a previous Antarctic expedition had been created.
- German battleship SMS Baden, the last ship of its kind to be built for the Imperial German Navy, was launched at Schichau-Werke in Danzig, Germany. Two sister ships, Sachsen and Württemberg, were not completed by the end of World War I and were subsequently scrapped.
- Daito Railway opened the Kyūdai Main Line in the Fukuoka Prefecture, Japan, with stations Onoya, Onigase, Mukainoharu, Kaku, Minami-Ōita and Furugō serving the line.
- Born:
  - Hugh Reilly, American actor, best known for the role of Paul Martin in the 1950s TV series Lassie; in Newark, New Jersey, United States (d. 1998)
  - Fred W. Friendly, American news producer, president of CBS News from 1964 to 1966, creator with Edward R. Murrow the news series See It Now; as Ferdinand Friendly Wachenheimer, in New York City, United States (d. 1998)
- Died: Charles Tupper, 94, Canadian state leader, 5th Premier of Nova Scotia and 6th Prime Minister of Canada (b. 1821)

== October 31, 1915 (Sunday) ==
- British destroyer HMS Louis was shelled and sunk at Suvla by Ottoman coastal artillery.
- The Joseon Industrial Exhibition closed in Gyeongseong, Korea (now Seoul), recording over a million visitors attending since it opened September 11.
- The women's sorority Lambda Omega was founded on the campus of University of California, Berkeley. It remained an active national collegiate until 1933 when it and Alpha Sigma Delta were absorbed into Theta Upsilon in 1933.
- Carmen, directed by Cecil B. DeMille, premiered with opera singer Geraldine Farrar making her screen debut as the title character. The film proved so popular Charlie Chaplin parodied it a month later.
- Died: Blanche Walsh, 42, American stage actress, best known for her stage performances in The Woman in the Case and stage adaptation of Leo Tolstoy's novel Resurrection (b. 1873)
