= Ōki Station =

Railway station in Kurume, Fukuoka Prefecture, Japan

Ōki Station 大城駅
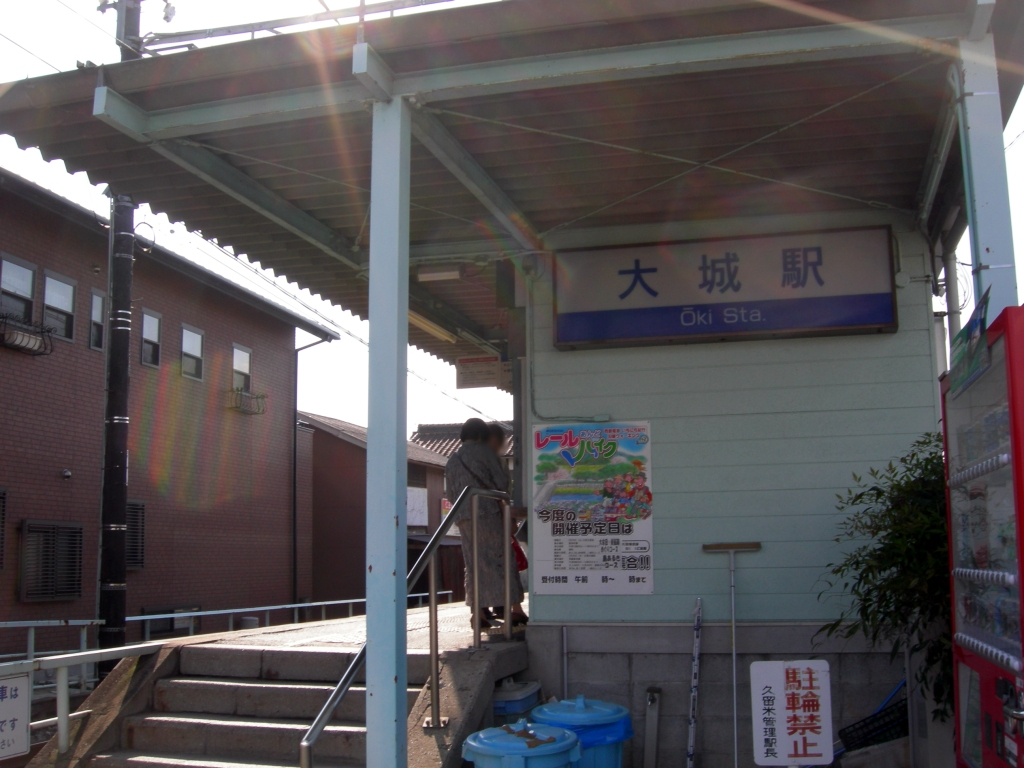
- Station platform

General information
- Location: Kitanomachi Otomaru, Kurume-shi, Fukuoka-ken 830-1125; Japan
- Coordinates: 33°21′3.41″N 130°36′29.09″E
- Operator: Nishi-Nippon Railroad
- Line: ■ Amagi Line
- Distance: 8.0 km fromMiyanojin
- Platforms: 1 side platform
- Connections

Construction
- Structure type: At-grade

Other information
- Status: Unstaffed
- Station code: A07
- Website: Official website

History
- Opened: 8 December 1921

Passengers
- FY2020: 541

Services
Preceding station	Nishitetsu	Following station
Kitano towards Miyanojin	Amagi Line	Kaneshima towards Amagi
Location
- Location within Fukuoka Prefecture Location within Japan

Ōki Station (大城駅, Ōki-eki) is a passenger railway station located in the city of Kurume, Fukuoka, Japan. It is operated by the private transportation company Nishi-Nippon Railroad (NNR), and has station number A07.

== Lines ==
The station is served by the Nishitetsu Amagi Line and is 8.0 kilometers from the starting point of the line at Miyanojin.

== Station layout ==
The station consists of a single side platform serving a single bi-directional track. The station is unattended.

== History ==
The station was opened on 8 December 1921 as a station on the Mitsui Electric Tramway. The company merged with the Kyushu Railway in 1924, which in turn merged with the Kyushu Electric Tramway on 19 September 1942. The company changed its name to Nishi-Nippon Railway three days later, on 22 September 1942.

== Passenger statistics ==
In fiscal 2020, the station was used by 541 passengers daily.

== Surrounding area ==
- Ōki Post Office
- Ōki Elementary School
- Ōki Nursery
- Ōki Clinic

== See also ==
- List of railway stations in Japan
