= Ōzeki Station (Fukuoka) =

Railway station in Tachiarai, Fukuoka Prefecture, Japan

Ōzeki Station 大堰駅
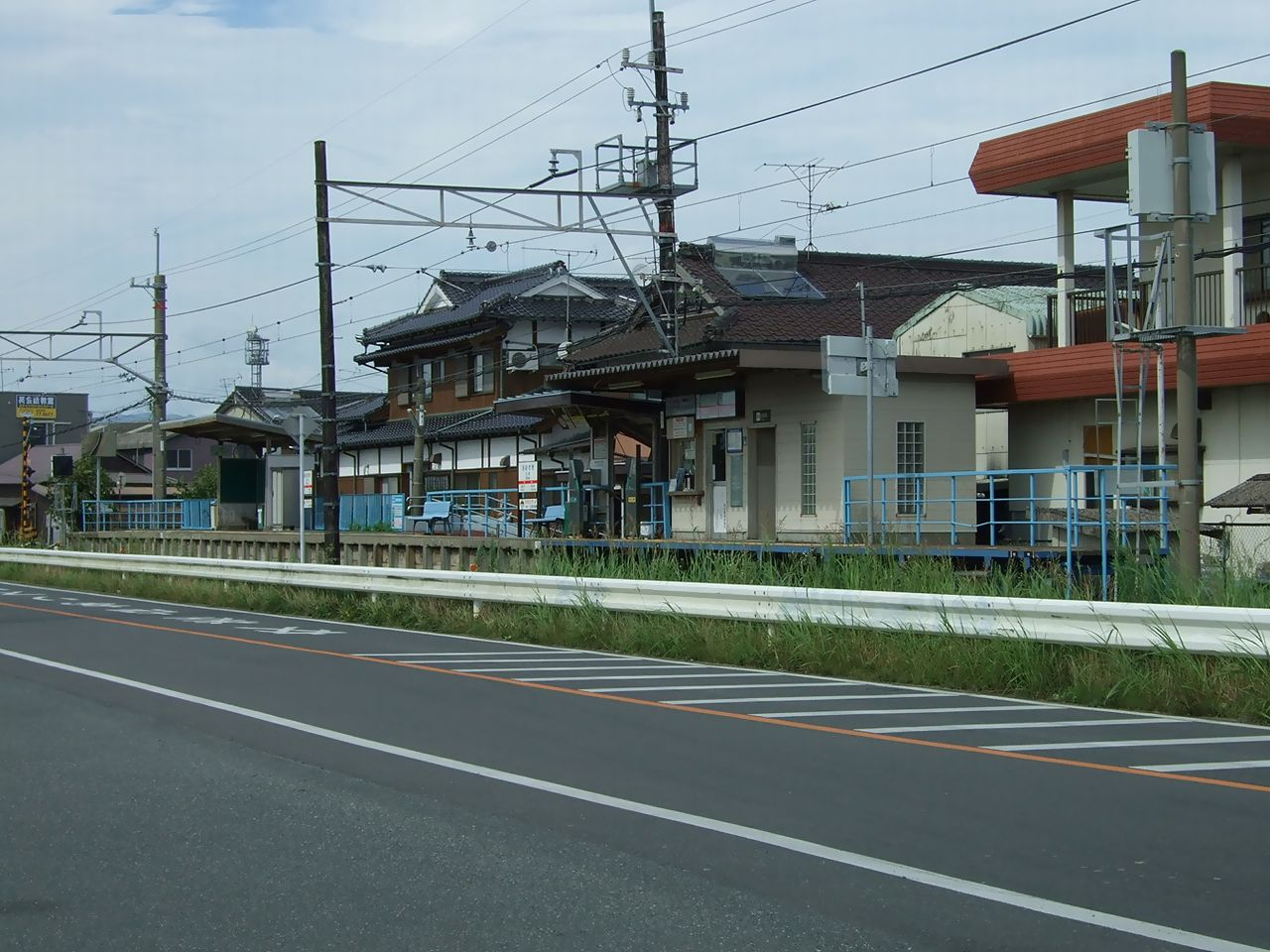
- Station building and platform

General information
- Location: Tomita, Tachiarai-machi, Mii-gun, Fukuoka-ken 830-1201; Japan
- Coordinates: 33°22′19.94″N 130°37′26.47″E
- Operator: Nishi-Nippon Railroad
- Line: ■ Amagi Line
- Distance: 11.6 km fromMiyanojin
- Platforms: 1 side platform
- Connections

Construction
- Structure type: At-grade

Other information
- Status: Unstaffed
- Station code: A05
- Website: Official website

History
- Opened: 8 December 1921

Passengers
- FY2022: 343

Services
Preceding station	Nishitetsu	Following station
Kaneshima towards Miyanojin	Amagi Line	Hongō towards Amagi
Location
- Location within Fukuoka Prefecture Location within Japan

Ōzeki Station (大堰駅, Ōzeki-eki) is a passenger railway station located in the town of Tachiarai, Fukuoka Prefecture, Japan. It is operated by the private transportation company Nishi-Nippon Railroad (NNR), and has station number A05.

== Lines ==
The station is served by the Nishitetsu Amagi Line and is 11.6 kilometers from the starting point of the line at Miyanojin.

== Station layout ==
The station consists of one side platform serving a single bi-directional track. The station is unattended.

== History ==
The station was opened on 8 December 1921. The company merged with the Kyushu Railway in 1924, which in turn merged with the Kyushu Electric Tramway on 19 September 1942. The company changed its name to Nishi-Nippon Railway three days later, on 22 September 1942.

== Passenger statistics ==
In fiscal 2022, the station was used by 343 passengers daily.

== Surrounding area ==
- Tachiarai Town Office
- Tachiarai Town Library
- Jotokuji Temple
- Imamura Church

== See also ==
- List of railway stations in Japan
