= Kamiura Station =

Railway station in Asakura, Fukuoka Prefecture, Japan

Kamiura Station 上浦駅
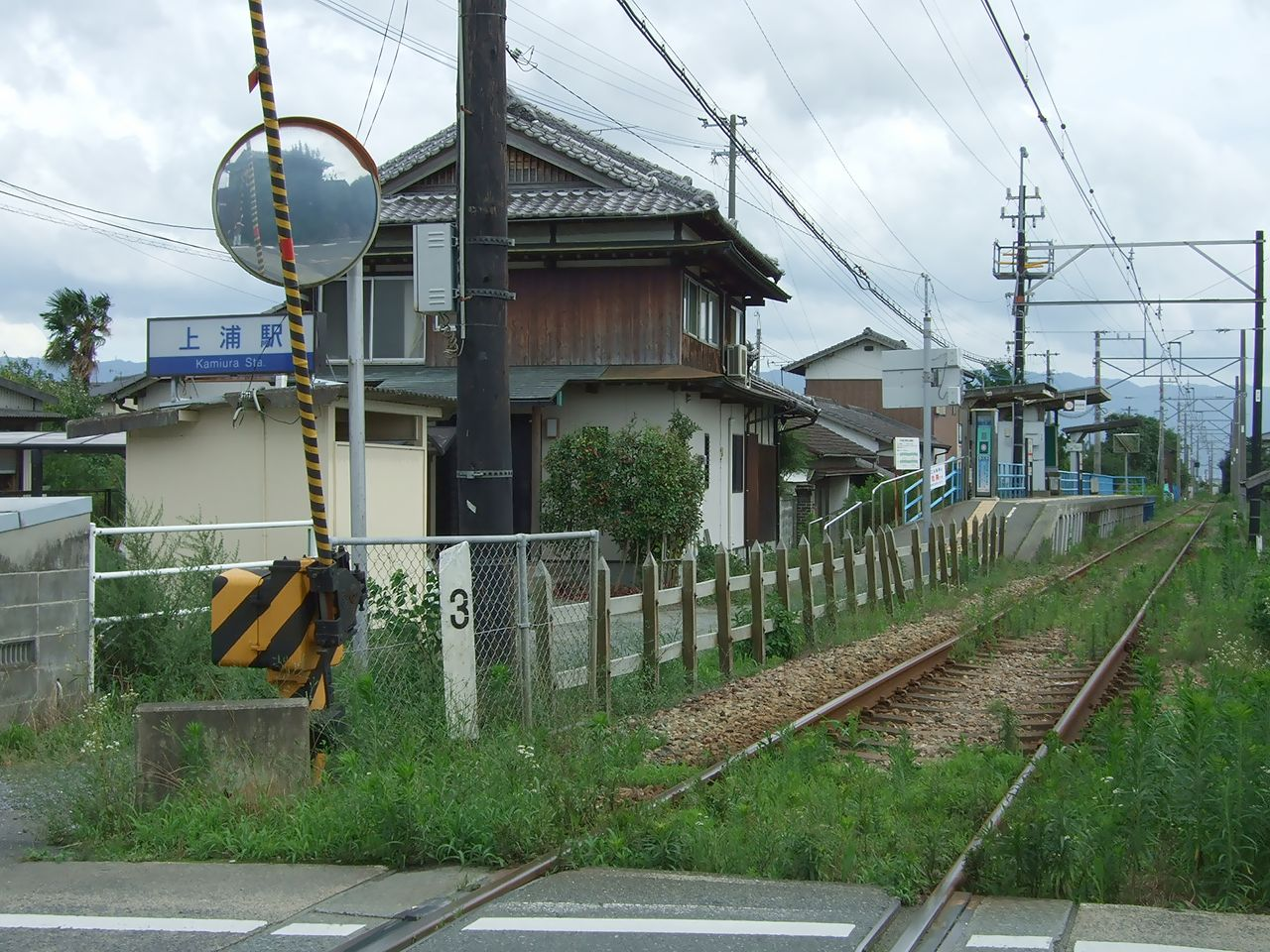
- Station building

General information
- Location: Kamiura, Asakura-shi, Fukuoka-ken 838-0057; Japan
- Coordinates: 33°23′55.56″N 130°38′13.73″E
- Operator: Nishi-Nippon Railroad
- Line: ■ Amagi Line
- Distance: 14.9 km from Miyanojin
- Platforms: 1 side platform
- Connections

Construction
- Structure type: At-grade

Other information
- Status: Unstaffed
- Station code: A03
- Website: Official website

History
- Opened: 8 December 1921

Passengers
- FY2022: 105

Services
Preceding station	Nishitetsu	Following station
Hongō towards Miyanojin	Amagi Line	Mada towards Amagi
Location
- Location within Fukuoka Prefecture Location within Japan

Kamiura Station (上浦駅, Kamiura-eki) is a passenger railway station located in the city of Asakura, Fukuoka, Japan. It is operated by the private transportation company Nishi-Nippon Railroad (NNR), and has station number A03.

== Lines ==
The station is served by the Nishitetsu Amagi Line and is 14.9 kilometers from the starting point of the line at Miyanojin.

== Station layout ==
The station consists of one side platform serving a single bi-directional track. The station is unattended.

== Platforms ==
1	■ Amagi Line	for Miyanojin, and Amagi

== History ==
The station opened on 8 December 1921 as a station on the Mitsui Electric Tramway. The company merged with the Kyushu Railway in 1924, which in turn merged with the Kyushu Electric Tramway on 19 September 1942. The company changed its name to Nishi-Nippon Railway three days later, on 22 September 1942.

== Passenger statistics ==
In fiscal 2022, the station was used by 105 passengers daily.

== Surrounding area ==
- Ōita Expressway
- Japan National Route 322
- Amagi Futaba Kindergarten
- Katsuki Hospital

== See also ==
- List of railway stations in Japan
