= Koganchaya Station =

Railway station in Kurume, Fukuoka Prefecture, Japan

Koganachaya Station 古賀茶屋駅
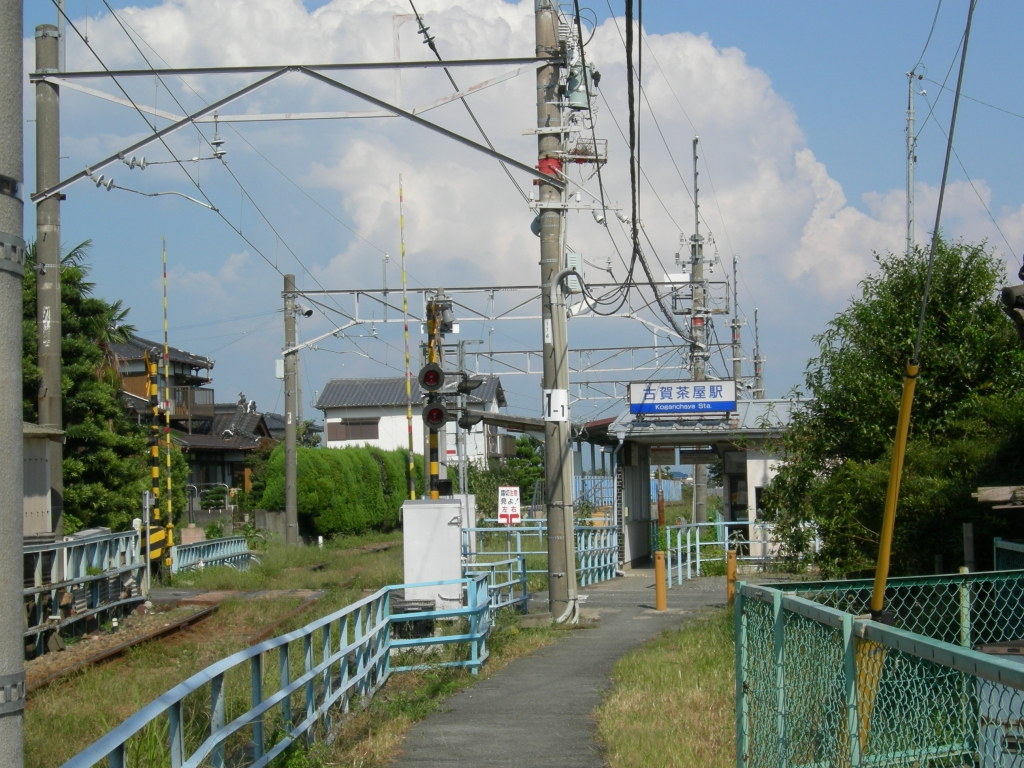
- Station building

General information
- Location: Hatchojima Miyanojinmachi, Kurume-shi, Fukuoka-ken 839-0805; Japan
- Coordinates: 33°20′36.53″N 130°33′59.02″E
- Operator: Nishi-Nippon Railroad
- Line: ■ Amagi Line
- Distance: 5.4 km fromMiyanojin
- Platforms: 1 side platform
- Connections

Construction
- Structure type: At-grade

Other information
- Status: Unstaffed
- Station code: A09
- Website: Official website

History
- Opened: 15 October 1915

Passengers
- FY2022: 503

Services
Preceding station	Nishitetsu	Following station
Gakkōmae towards Miyanojin	Amagi Line	Kitano towards Amagi
Location
- Location within Fukuoka Prefecture Location within Japan

Koganchaya Station (古賀茶屋駅, Koganchaya-eki) is a passenger railway station located in the city of Kurume, Fukuoka, Japan. It is operated by the private transportation company Nishi-Nippon Railroad (NNR), and has station number A09.

== Lines ==
The station is served by the Nishitetsu Amagi Line and is 3.9 kilometers from the starting point of the line at Miyanojin.

== Station layout ==
The station consists of a two opposed side platforms connected to the station building by a level crossing. Platform 1, which is directly connected to the station building, is bound for Miyanojin, and Platform 2 is for trains bound for Amagi, but the signal structure allows trains to depart from both tracks in either direction. The station is unattended.

== Platforms ==
1	■ Nishitetsu Amagi Line	for Kurume and Miyanojin
2	■ Nishitetsu Amagi Line	for Amagi

== History ==
The station opened on 15 October 1915 as a station on the Mitsui Electric Tramway. The company merged with the Kyushu Railway in 1924, which in turn merged with the Kyushu Electric Tramway on 19 September 1942. The company changed its name to Nishi-Nippon Railway three days later, on 22 September 1942.

== Passenger statistics ==
In fiscal 2022, the station was used by 503 passengers daily.

== Surrounding area ==
- Hatchojima Police Station
- Kameo Clinic

== See also ==
- List of railway stations in Japan
