= Mada Station =

Railway station in Asakura, Fukuoka Prefecture, Japan

Mada Station 馬田駅
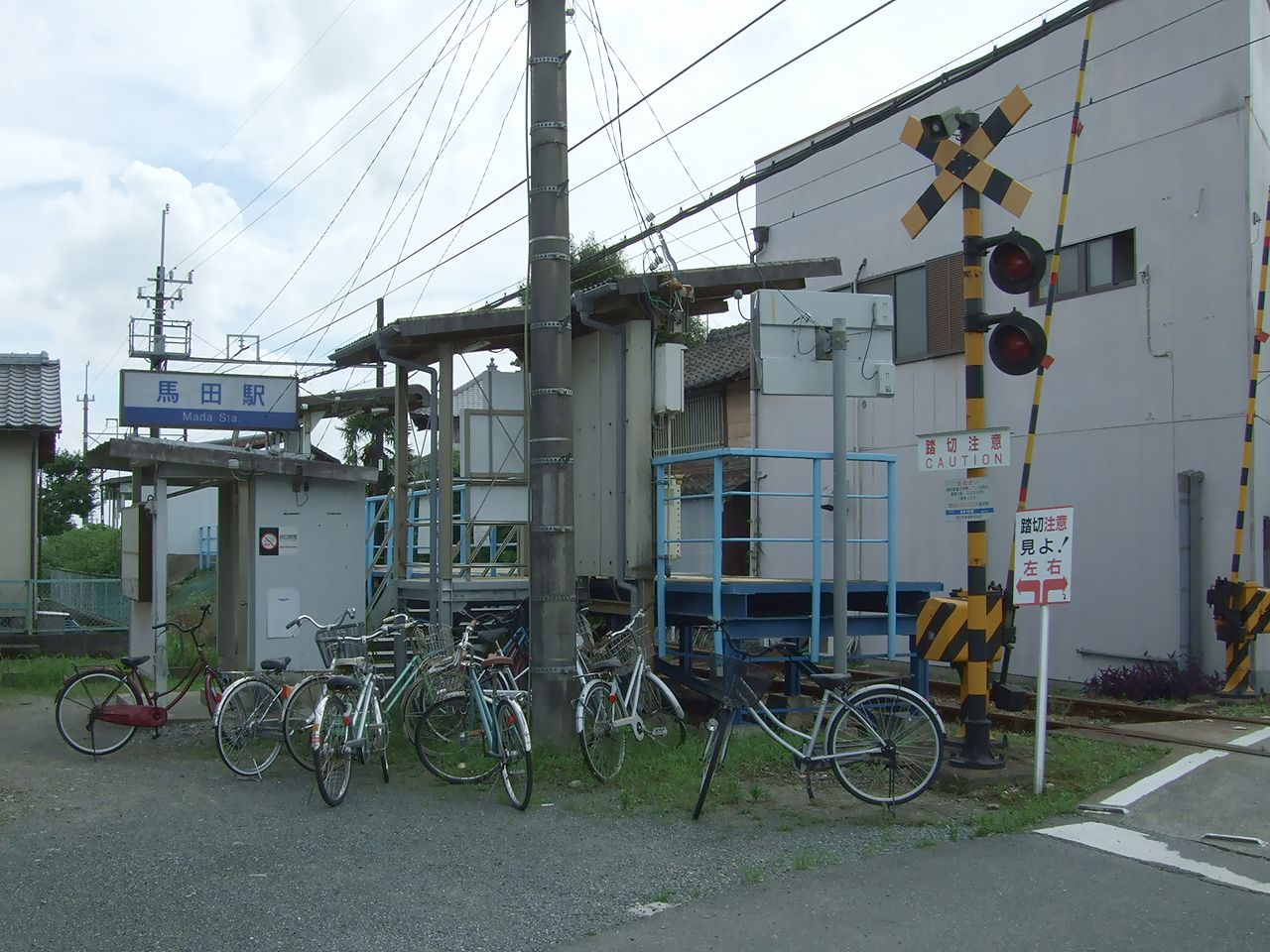
- Station building

General information
- Location: Mada, Asakura-shi, Fukuoka-ken 838-0058; Japan
- Coordinates: 33°24′28″N 130°38′26.95″E
- Operator: Nishi-Nippon Railroad
- Line: ■ Amagi Line
- Distance: 16.1 km from Miyanojin
- Platforms: 1 side platform
- Connections

Construction
- Structure type: At-grade

Other information
- Status: Unstaffed
- Station code: A03
- Website: Official website

History
- Opened: 8 December 1921

Passengers
- FY2022: 110

Services
Preceding station	Nishitetsu	Following station
Kamiura towards Miyanojin	Amagi Line	Amagi Terminus
Location
- Location within Fukuoka Prefecture Location within Japan

Mada Station (馬田駅, Mada-eki) is a passenger railway station located in the city of Asakura, Fukuoka, Japan. It is operated by the private transportation company Nishi-Nippon Railroad (NNR), and has station number A02.

== Lines ==
The station is served by the Nishitetsu Amagi Line and is 16.1 kilometers from the starting point of the line at Miyanojin.

== Station layout ==
The station consists of one side platform serving a single bi-directional track. The station is unattended.

== Platforms ==
1	■ Amagi Line	for Miyanojin, and Amagi

== History ==
The station opened on 8 December 1921 as a station on the Mitsui Electric Tramway. The company merged with the Kyushu Railway in 1924, which in turn merged with the Kyushu Electric Tramway on 19 September 1942. The company changed its name to Nishi-Nippon Railway three days later, on 22 September 1942.

== Passenger statistics ==
In fiscal 2022, the station was used by 110 passengers daily.

== Surrounding area ==
- Japan National Route 500
- Mada Elementary School
- Mada Post Office
- Kumano Shrine

== See also ==
- List of railway stations in Japan
