= Gakkōmae Station =

Railway station in Kurume, Fukuoka Prefecture, Japan

Gakkōmae Station 学校前駅
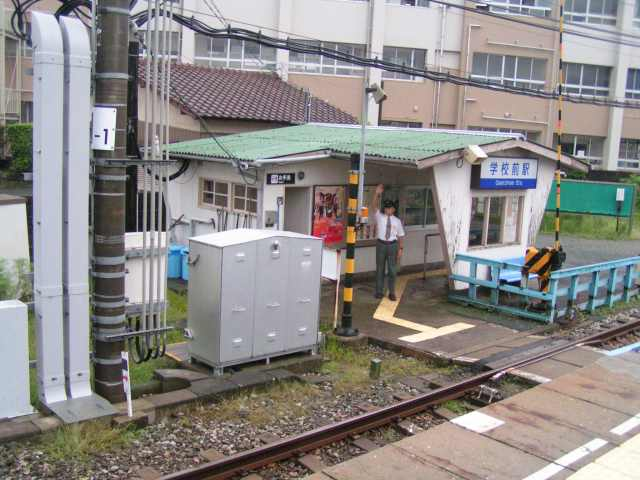
- Station building

General information
- Location: Oto Miyanojinmachi, Kurume-shi, Fukuoka-ken 839-0803; Japan
- Coordinates: 33°20′10.16″N 130°32′49.67″E
- Operator: Nishi-Nippon Railroad
- Line: ■ Amagi Line
- Distance: 1.7 km fromMiyanojin
- Platforms: 1 island platform
- Connections

Construction
- Structure type: At-grade

Other information
- Status: Unstaffed
- Station code: A10
- Website: Official website

History
- Opened: 15 October 1915

Passengers
- FY2020: 356

Services
Preceding station	Nishitetsu	Following station
Gorōmaru towards Miyanojin	Amagi Line	Koganchaya towards Amagi
Location
- Location within Fukuoka Prefecture Location within Japan

Gakkōmae Station (学校前駅, Gakkō-mae-eki) is a passenger railway station located in the city of Kurume, Fukuoka, Japan. It is operated by the private transportation company Nishi-Nippon Railroad (NNR), and has station number A10.

== Lines ==
The station is served by the Nishitetsu Amagi Line and is 1.7 kilometers from the starting point of the line at Miyanojin.

== Station layout ==
The station consists of a single island platform connected to the station building by a level crossing. The station is unattended.

== Platforms ==
1	■ Nishitetsu Amagi Line	for Amagi
2	■ Nishitetsu Amagi Line	for Miyanojin

== History ==
The station opened on 15 October 1915 as a station on the Mitsui Electric Tramway. The station was opened on 8 December 1921 The company merged with the Kyushu Railway in 1924, which in turn merged with the Kyushu Electric Tramway on 19 September 1942. The company changed its name to Nishi-Nippon Railway three days later, on 22 September 1942.

== Passenger statistics ==
In fiscal 2020, the station was used by 356 passengers daily.

== Surrounding area ==
- Miyanojin Elementary School
- Miyanojin Junior High School
- Koga Hospital 21
- Kurumetaisha Post Office
- JA Kurume Hokubu Branch

== See also ==
- List of railway stations in Japan
