= Kitano Station (Fukuoka) =

Railway station in Kurume, Fukuoka Prefecture, Japan

Kitano Station 北野駅
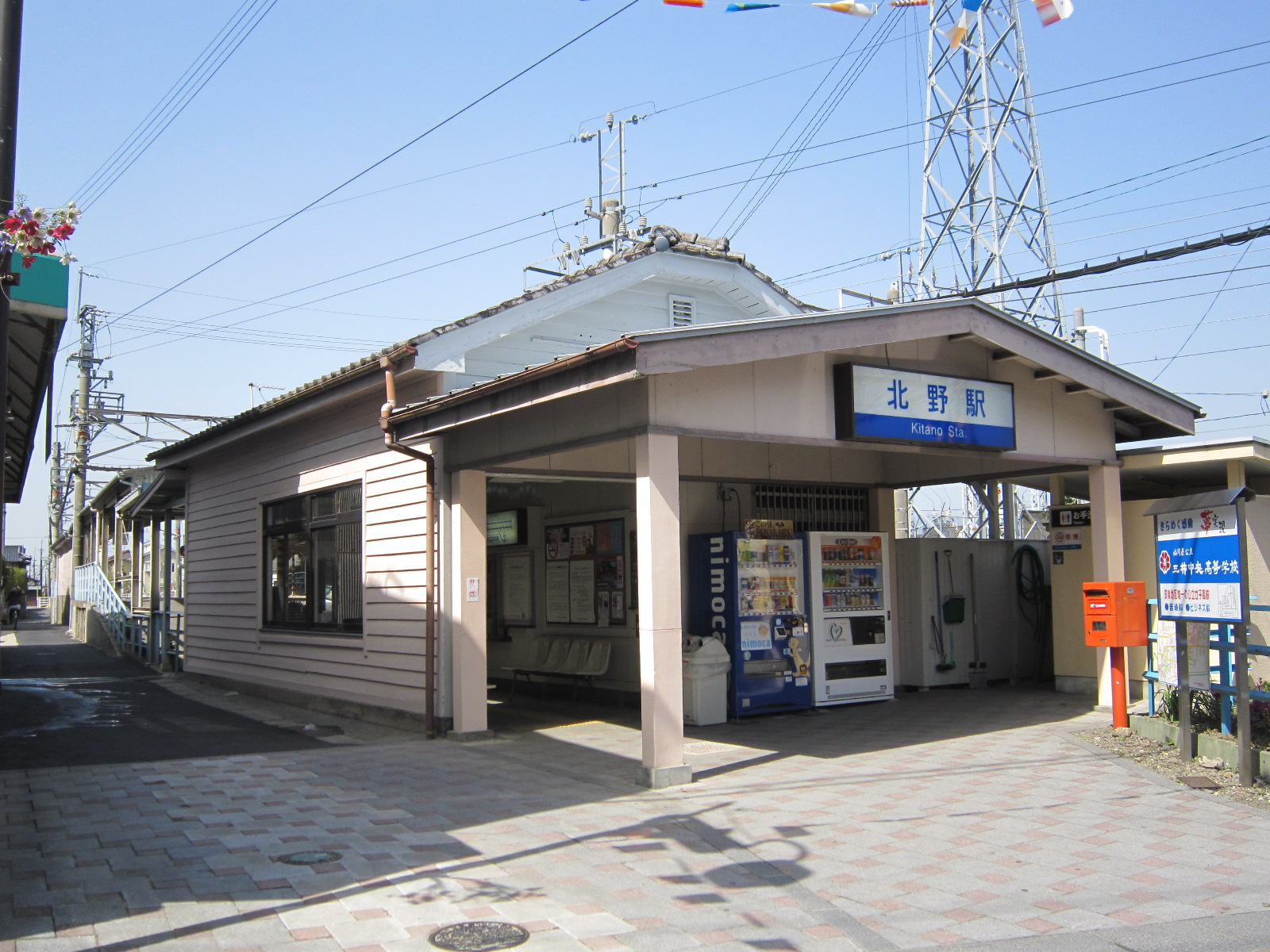
- Station building

General information
- Location: Kitanomachi Imayama, Kurume-shi, Fukuoka-ken 830-1122; Japan
- Coordinates: 33°20′43.53″N 130°34′59.37″E
- Operator: Nishi-Nippon Railroad
- Line: ■ Amagi Line
- Distance: 5.4 km from Miyanojin
- Platforms: 2 side platforms
- Connections

Construction
- Structure type: At-grade

Other information
- Status: Unstaffed
- Station code: A08
- Website: Official website

History
- Opened: 15 October 1915

Passengers
- FY2022: 1687

Services
Preceding station	Nishitetsu	Following station
Koganchaya towards Miyanojin	Amagi Line	Ōki towards Amagi
Location
- Location within Fukuoka Prefecture Location within Japan

Kitano Station (北野駅, Kitano-eki) is a passenger railway station located in the city of Kurume, Fukuoka, Japan. It is operated by the private transportation company Nishi-Nippon Railroad (NNR), and has station number A08.

== Lines ==
The station is served by the Nishitetsu Amagi Line and is 5.4 kilometers from the starting point of the line at Miyanojin.

== Station layout ==
The station consists of a twi opposed side platforms connected by a level crossing. The station is unattended.

== Platforms ==
1	■ Nishitetsu Amagi Line	for Miyanojin
2	■ Nishitetsu Amagi Line	for Amagi

== History ==
The station opened on 15 October 1915 as a station on the Mitsui Electric Tramway. The line was extended to Amagi on 8 December 1921. The company merged with the Kyushu Railway in 1924, which in turn merged with the Kyushu Electric Tramway on 19 September 1942. The company changed its name to Nishi-Nippon Railway three days later, on 22 September 1942.

== Passenger statistics ==
In fiscal 2022, the station was used by 1687 passengers daily.

== Surrounding area ==
- Kitano Town Office
- Miichuo High School
- Kitano Elementary School
- Kitano Cosmos Park
- Kitano Tenmangu Shrine
- Kitano Post Office

== See also ==
- List of railway stations in Japan
