= Kaneshima Station =

Railway station in Kurume, Fukuoka Prefecture, Japan

Kaneshima Station 金島駅
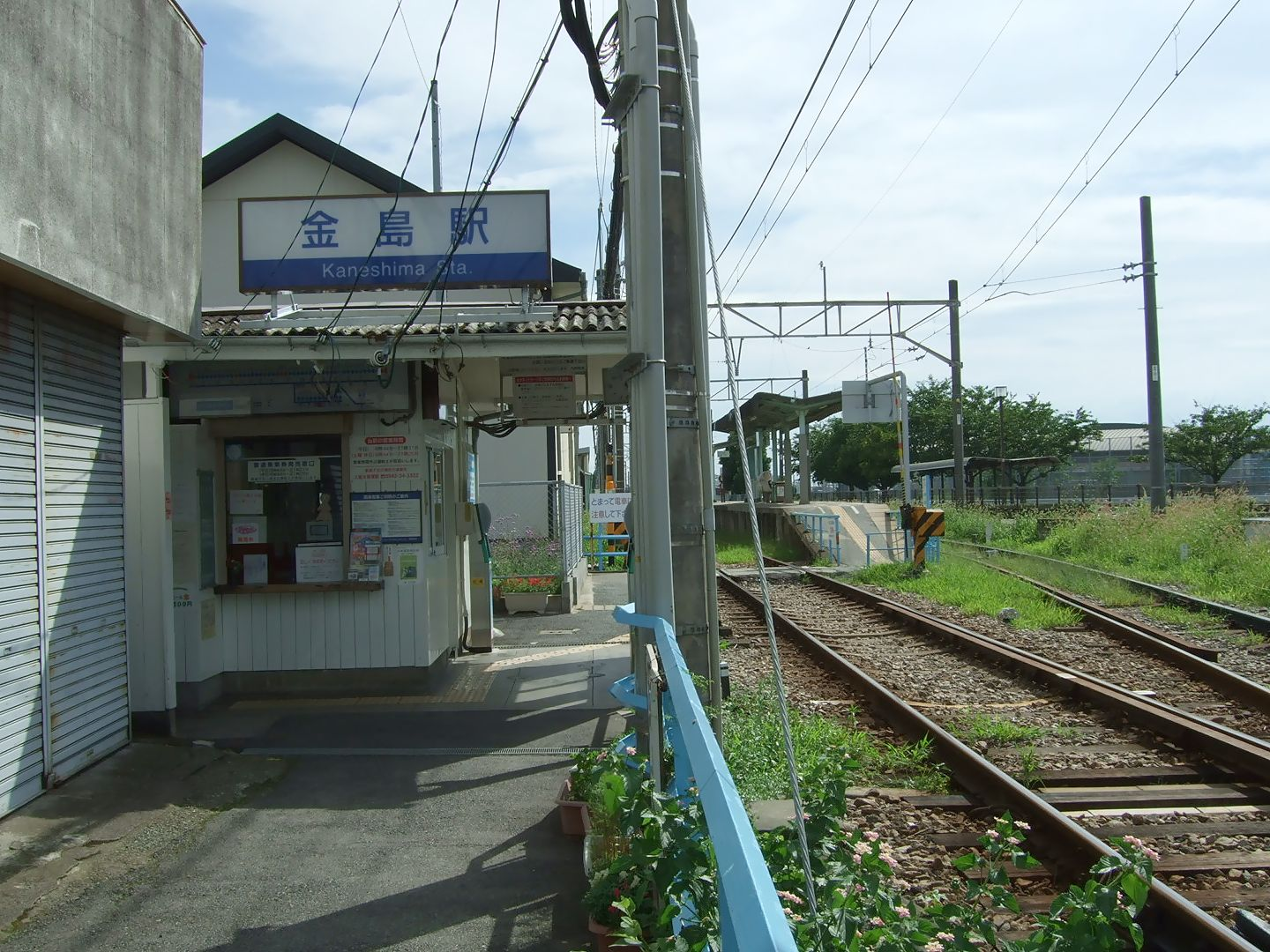
- Station building and platform

General information
- Location: Kitanomachi Yaegame, Kurume-shi, Fukuoka-ken; Japan
- Coordinates: 33°21′11.08″N 130°37′21.18″E
- Operator: Nishi-Nippon Railroad
- Line: ■ Amagi Line
- Distance: 9.4 km fromMiyanojin
- Platforms: 1 island platform
- Connections

Construction
- Structure type: At-grade

Other information
- Status: Unstaffed
- Station code: A06
- Website: Official website

History
- Opened: 8 December 1921

Passengers
- FY2020: 605

Services
Preceding station	Nishitetsu	Following station
Ōki towards Miyanojin	Amagi Line	Ōzeki towards Amagi
Location
- Location within Fukuoka Prefecture Location within Japan

Kaneshima Station (金島駅, Kaneshima-eki) is a passenger railway station located in the city of Kurume, Fukuoka, Japan. It is operated by the private transportation company Nishi-Nippon Railroad (NNR), and has station number A06.

== Lines ==
The station is served by the Nishitetsu Amagi Line and is 9.4 kilometers from the starting point of the line at Miyanojin.

== Station layout ==
The station consists of a single island platform connected to the station building by a level crossing. The station is unattended.

== Platforms ==
1	■ Nishitetsu Amagi Line	for Amagi
2	■ Nishitetsu Amagi Line	for Miyanojin

== History ==
The station was opened on 8 December 1921 as a station on the Mitsui Electric Tramway. The company merged with the Kyushu Railway in 1924, which in turn merged with the Kyushu Electric Tramway on 19 September 1942. The company changed its name to Nishi-Nippon Railway three days later, on 22 September 1942. The station building renovated in 1964.

== Passenger statistics ==
In fiscal 2020, the station was used by 605 passengers daily.

== Surrounding area ==
- Kaneshima Nursery
- Kaneshima Elementary School
- Kaneshima Post Office
- Kumashiro Hospital

== See also ==
- List of railway stations in Japan
