= Hongō Station =

Hongō Station is the name of four train stations in Japan:

- Hongō Station (Nagoya) in Nagoya, Aichi Prefecture.
- Hongō Station (Fukuoka)
- Hongō Station (Hiroshima)
- Hongō Station (Nagano)
