= 金島駅 =

金島駅 may refer to:

- Kanashima Station
- Kaneshima Station
