= Gorōmaru Station =

Railway station in Kurume, Fukuoka Prefecture, Japan

Gorōmaru Station 五郎丸駅
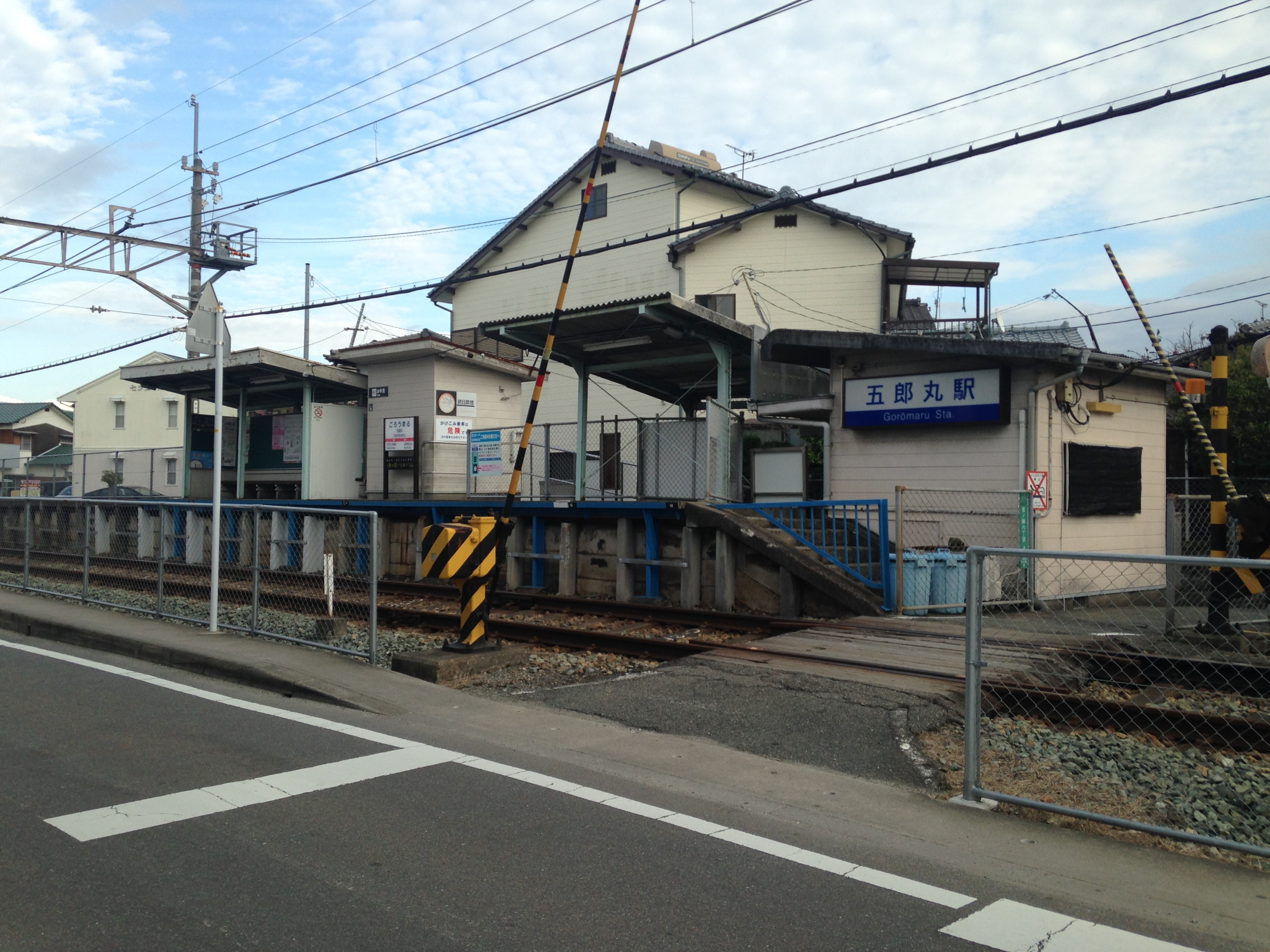
- Station platform

General information
- Location: 6-chōme-4 Miyanojin, Kurume-shi, Fukuoka-ken 839-0801; Japan
- Coordinates: 33°19′49.61″N 130°32′23.54″E
- Operator: Nishi-Nippon Railroad
- Line: ■ Amagi Line
- Distance: 0.9 km fromMiyanojin
- Platforms: 1 side platform
- Connections

Construction
- Structure type: At-grade

Other information
- Status: Unstaffed
- Station code: A11
- Website: Official website

History
- Opened: 15 October 1915

Passengers
- FY2022: 754

Services
Preceding station	Nishitetsu	Following station
Miyanojin Terminus	Amagi Line	Gakkōmae towards Amagi
Location
- Location within Fukuoka Prefecture Location within Japan

Gorōmaru Station (五郎丸駅, Gorōmaru-eki) is a passenger railway station located in the city of Kurume, Fukuoka, Japan. It is operated by the private transportation company Nishi-Nippon Railroad (NNR), and has station number A11.

== Lines ==
The station is served by the Nishitetsu Amagi Line and is 0.9 kilometers from the starting point of the line at Miyanojin.

== Station layout ==
The station consists of a one side platform serving a single bi-directional track. The station is unattended.

== History ==
The station opened on 15 October 1915 as a station on the Mitsui Electric Tramway. The station was opened on 8 December 1921 The company merged with the Kyushu Railway in 1924, which in turn merged with the Kyushu Electric Tramway on 19 September 1942. The company changed its name to Nishi-Nippon Railway three days later, on 22 September 1942.

== Passenger statistics ==
In fiscal 2022, the station was used by 754 passengers daily.

== Surrounding area ==
- Kyushu Expressway
- Kurume Business Plaza
- Miyanojin Post Office
- Koga Hospital 21

== See also ==
- List of railway stations in Japan
