= Hongō Station (Fukuoka) =

Railway station in Tachiarai, Fukuoka Prefecture, Japan

Hongō Station 本郷駅
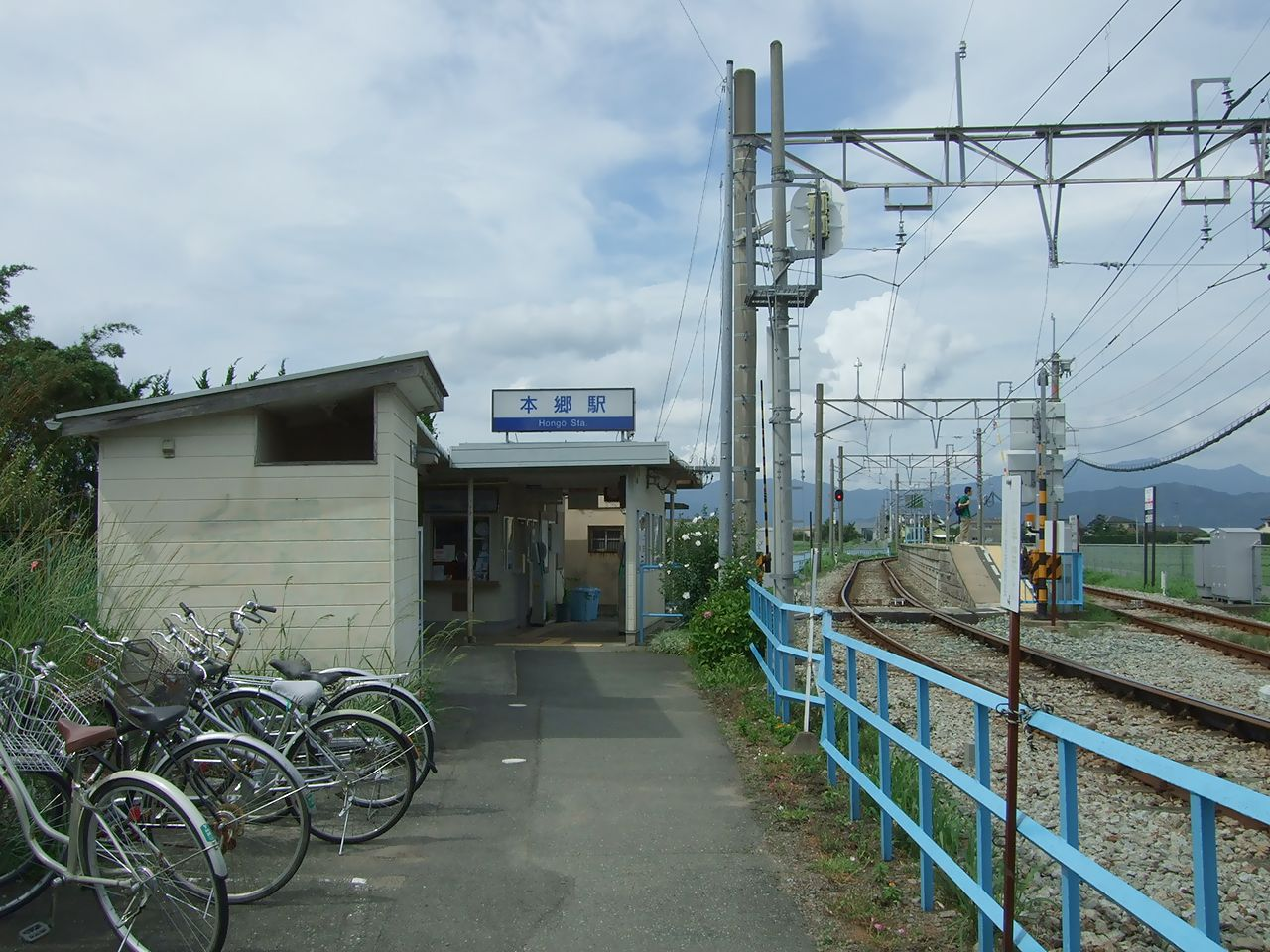
- Station building

General information
- Location: Hongō, Tachiaraimachi, Mii-gun, Fukuoka-ken 830-1211; Japan
- Coordinates: 33°23′5.72″N 130°37′43.5″E
- Operator: Nishi-Nippon Railroad
- Line: ■ Amagi Line
- Distance: 11.6 km fromMiyanojin
- Platforms: 1 island platform

Construction
- Structure type: At-grade

Other information
- Status: Unstaffed
- Station code: A04
- Website: Official website

History
- Opened: 8 December 1921

Passengers
- 2022: 392 daily

Services
Preceding station	Nishitetsu	Following station
Ōzeki towards Miyanojin	Amagi Line	Kamiura towards Amagi
Location
- Location within Fukuoka Prefecture Location within Japan

Hongō Station (本郷駅, Hongō-eki) is a passenger railway station located in the town of Tachiarai, Fukuoka Prefecture, Japan. It is operated by the private transportation company Nishi-Nippon Railroad (NNR), and has station number A04.

== Lines ==
The station is served by the Nishitetsu Amagi Line and is 13.1 kilometers from the starting point of the line at Miyanojin.

== Station layout ==
The station consists of one island platform with a level crossing. The station is unattended.

== Platforms ==
1	■ Nishitetsu Amagi Line	for Amagi
2	■ Nishitetsu Amagi Line	for Miyanojin

== History ==
The station was opened on 8 December 1921. The company merged with the Kyushu Railway in 1924, which in turn merged with the Kyushu Electric Tramway on 19 September 1942. The company changed its name to Nishi-Nippon Railway three days later, on 22 September 1942.

== Passenger statistics ==
In fiscal 2022, the station was used by 392 passengers daily.

== Surrounding area ==
- Hongō Elementary School
- Hongō Nursery
- Tachiarai Post Office

== See also ==
- List of railway stations in Japan
