= Rizzato =

Rizzato or Rizzatto is an Italian surname. It may refer to:

- Albert of Rizzato (died 1245), Italian Catholic bishop and patriarch of Antioch
- Gala Rizzatto (born 1975), Italian pop singer and songwriter
- Gildo Rizzato (born 1948), Italian footballer
- Oscar Rizzato (1928–2021), Italian Catholic bishop
- Romano Rizzato (1936–2025), Italian painter and illustrator
- Simone Rizzato (born 1981), Italian footballer
