= Krivolak =

Area in North Macedonia

Coordinates: 41.5272°N 22.1208°E

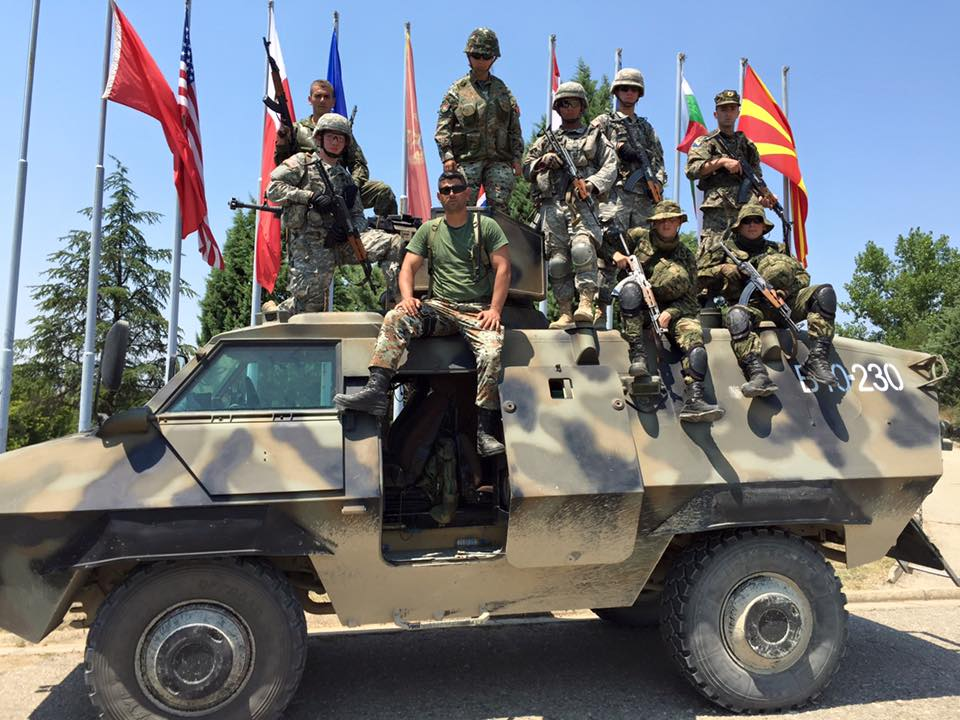
Soldiers from North Macedonia, the United States, the UK, Kosovo, Montenegro, Bosnia & Herzegovina, Croatia, Poland, Turkey, and Bulgaria took part in a multinational training event at Krivolak in 2015 designed to build trust between NATO partners, and assess the military capabilities of states looking to join NATO.

Krivolak (Macedonian: Криволак) is an area in east-central North Macedonia, where Krivolak Military Training Center, the largest military base of the Macedonian Army and the largest military training area in the Balkans, is located. The area is primarily used for the training of the Macedonian Armed Forces and its allies. The base has also been used for NATO exercises, and, while North Macedonia was a part of Yugoslavia, for testing of chemical weapons.

== Overview ==
Krivolak occupies a large area of mostly barren landscape. Hills, valleys, and a desert are used to test the skills and endurance of soldiers that train there. The military drills that take place there often are a combination of heavy artillery firing, aerial bombardment, and infantry attack. Many objects are used to simulate real warfare conditions, including temporary buildings and structures, vehicles, and other impediments. The military training area within the base is sometimes used for training of United Nations Military Observers (UNMOs).

Krivolak is also the location of an annual training exercise sponsored by the Consortium for Humanitarian Service and Education (CHSE). The Consortium is a collaborative effort of academic, government, and non-governmental organizations in the United States and North Macedonia. The training includes university students from North Macedonia and the United States who are involved in organizing and conducting a humanitarian response to a simulated major earthquake.
