= Gildo Rizzato =

Italian footballer

Personal information
- Full name: Gildo Rizzato
- Date of birth: 2 February 1948 (age 78)
- Place of birth: Montagnana, Italy
- Height: 1.70 m (5 ft 7 in)
- Position: Striker

Youth career
- Montagnana

Senior career*
Years	Team	Apps	(Gls)
1964-1965	Legnago	?	(0?)
1965-1966	Spal	?	(0?)
1966-1967	Legnago		
1967-1969	Spal	11	(0)
1969-1971	Empoli	41	(9)
1971-1973	Triestina	29	(3)
1973	Toronto Italia		
1973-1975	Sangiovannese	44	(1)
1975-1977	Nuovo Monselice		
- * Club domestic league appearances and goals

Gildo Rizzato (born 2 February 1948) is an Italian former footballer who played as a forward.

== Career ==
Rizzato played at the youth level with A.C. Montagnana. In 1964, he played with F.C. Legnago Salus, and the following season with S.P.A.L. He returned to Legnago in 1966, and had another stint with SPAL in the Serie A in 1967. In 1968, he played in the Serie B with SPAL, and in 1969 he played in the Serie C with Empoli F.C. He played in the Serie D with U.S. Triestina Calcio 1918, and assisted in securing promotion by winning the league title.

In the summer of 1973 he played abroad in the National Soccer League with Toronto Italia. In late 1973, he played with A.S.D. Sangiovannese 1927, and later played with A.S.D. Nuovo Monselice Calcio.

== Managerial career ==
Rizzato became the president for Abano Calcio in 1991, and in 2019 he was named the honorary president for the club.

== Personal life ==
In 1987, he founded GR Bike a company that markets cycle sport.
