= Tachiarai, Fukuoka =

Tachiarai 大刀洗町
- Town
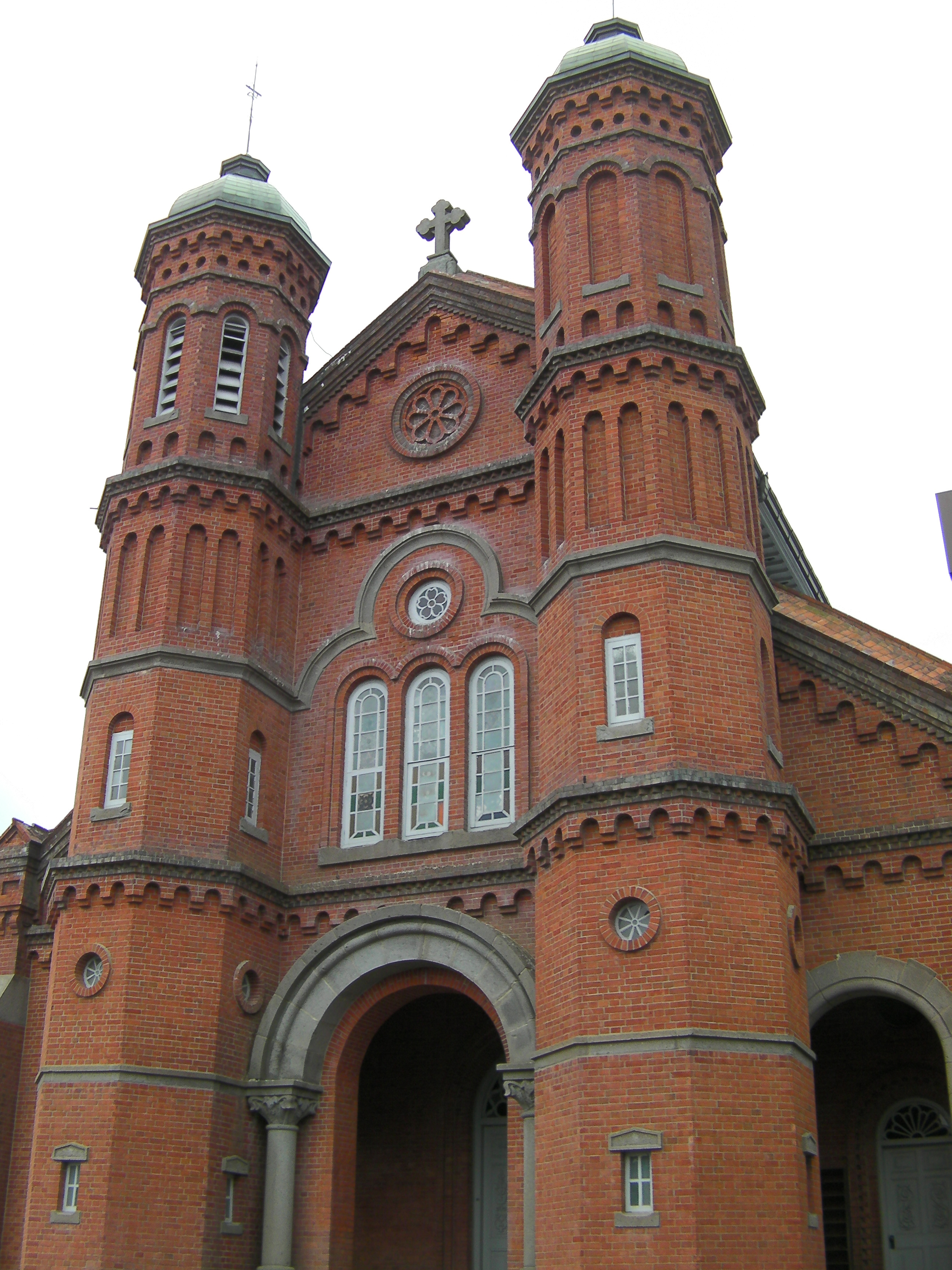
- Imamura Catholic Church

- Flag Chapter
- Location of Tachiarai in Fukuoka Prefecture

- Location in Japan
- Coordinates: 33°22′20″N 130°37′21″E
- Country: Japan
- Region: Kyushu
- Prefecture: Fukuoka
- District: Mii

Area
  - Total: 22.84 km^{2} (8.82 sq mi)

Population (January 31, 2024)
  - Total: 16,065
  - Density: 703.4/km^{2} (1,822/sq mi)
- Time zone: UTC+09:00 (JST)
- City hall address: 819 Tomita, Tachiarai-machi, Mii-gun, Fukuoka-ken 830-1298
- Website: Official website
- Symbols
- Bird: Skylark
- Flower: Cherry blossom
- Tree: Ilex integra

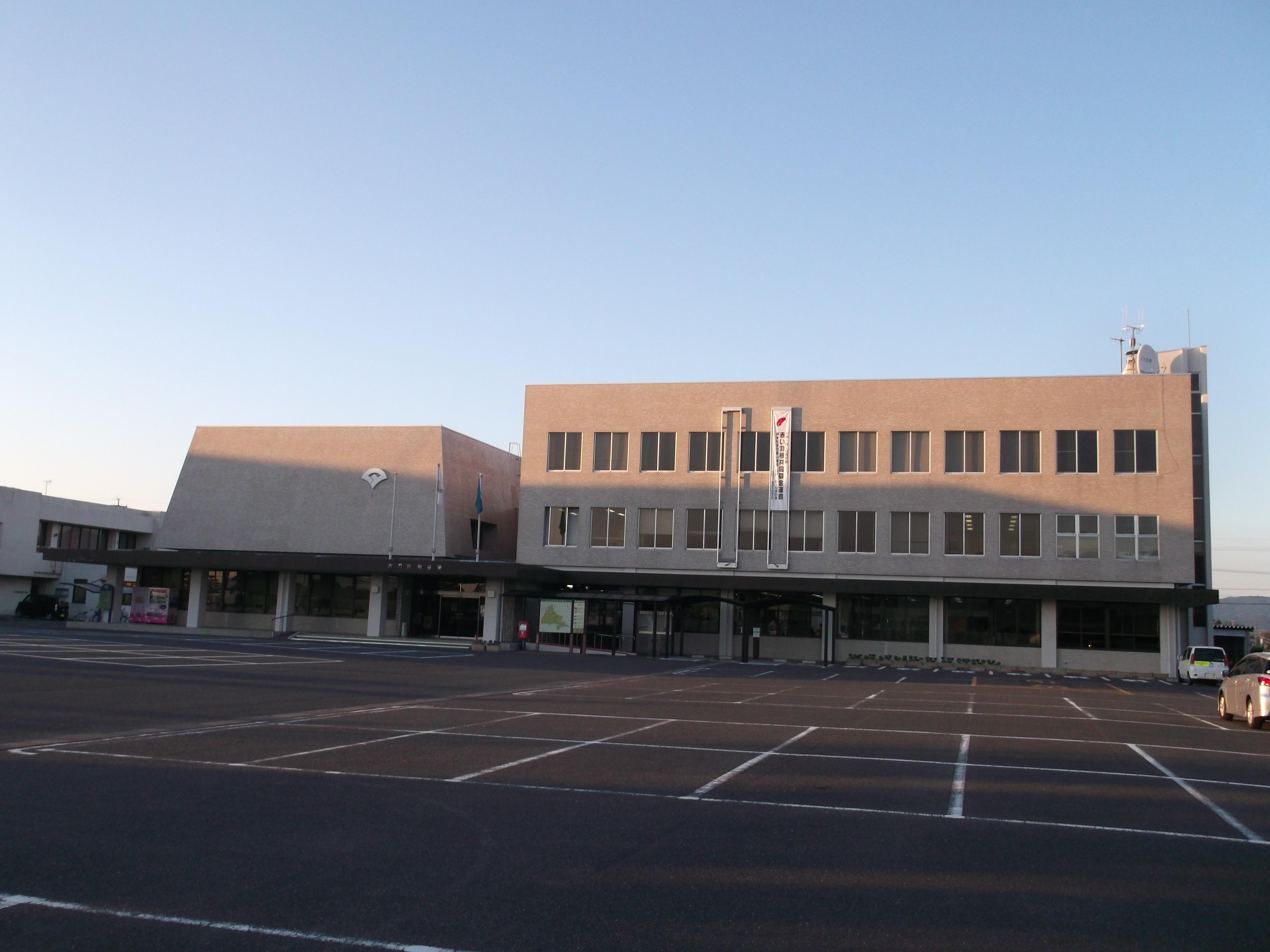
Tachiarai Town Hall

Tachiarai (大刀洗町, Tachiarai-machi) is a town located in Mii District, Fukuoka Prefecture, Japan. As of 31 January 2024, the town had an estimated population of 16,065 in 6283 households, and a population density of 700 persons per km^{2}. The total area of the town is 22.84 km^{2} (8.82 sq mi).

== Geography ==
Tachiarai is located in southern Fukuoka Prefecture and the northern part of the Chikugo Plain, approximately 15 kilometers northeast of Kurume City and approximately 30 kilometers southeast of Fukuoka City. The topography is flat and the Chikugo River flows through the southeastern part of the town, forming the border with Kurume City. Tachiarai is divided into three neighborhoods: Ozeki, Hongō and Kikuchi.

=== Neighboring municipalities ===
Fukuoka Prefecture

- Asakura
- Chikuzen
- Kurume
- Ogōri

=== Climate ===
Tachiarai has a humid subtropical climate (Köppen Cfa) characterized by warm summers and cool winters with light to no snowfall. The average annual temperature in Tachiarai is 15.2 °C. The average annual rainfall is 1946 mm with September as the wettest month. The temperatures are highest on average in August, at around 26.4 °C, and lowest in January, at around 4.4 °C.

=== Demographics ===
Per Japanese census data, the population of Tachiarai is as shown below

Historical population
Year	Pop.	±%
1940	12,239	—
1950	13,943	+13.9%
1960	13,371	−4.1%
1970	12,769	−4.5%
1980	13,203	+3.4%
1990	14,098	+6.8%
2000	15,227	+8.0%
2010	15,285	+0.4%
2020	15,521	+1.5%

== History ==
The area of Tachiarai was part of ancient Chikugo Province and during the Edo Period was part of the holdings of Kurume Domain. The village of Tachiarai was established on May 1, 1889 with the creation of the modern municipalities system. Tachiarai was home to an Imperial Japanese Army Air Force Base, established in 1919 and the Tachiarai Army Flight School, established in 1940, before American bombers destroyed them in 1945. On March 31,1955 Tachiarai merged with the villages of Ōzeki and Hongō and was raised to town status.

=== Kakure Kirishitan community ===
During the Edo Period (1603-1867), Tachiarai was home to a community of Japanese hidden Christians (Kakure Kirishitans) who were present in the area since the 16th century, centered in the village of Imamura. They were one of the very few Kakure Kirishitan communities in Kyushu outside present-day Nagasaki prefecture. The community was quite successful in remaining hidden, avoiding being targeted by any crackdowns by the Tokugawa shogunate, which had banned Christianity on pain of death. As with other Kakure Kirishitan communities, the so-called "Imamura Christians" had unique practices and beliefs, such as the cult of a saint-like figure called "Joan Mataemon" whose historicity remains uncertain.

In 1867, the community was "discovered" by Christians from Urakami, triggering a process of conversion to Roman Catholicism. This attracted attention from the local authorities as Christianity was still banned in Japan, resulting in a large number of arrests, although all were released by 1868. By 1912, there were 2,712 Catholics in Tachiarai, but those began to emigrate en-masse to Brazil and later to other South American countries. In contrast to its centuries of hiding in Japan, Tachiarai's Catholic diaspora was highly active in Brazil, having participated in the foundation of the Colégio São Francisco Xavier in São Paulo, which for decades was the most renowned educational institution for Brazilian nikkeis, and of churches in the cities of Registro and Promissão.

The present-day Brick Gothic Imamura Church was constructed with materials donated from Germany and inaugurated in 1913. In 2006, it was declared as a Tangible Cultural Heritage of Fukuoka prefecture, and in 2015, an Important Cultural Property of Japan.

== Government ==
Tachiarai has a mayor-council form of government with a directly elected mayor and a unicameral town council of 12 members. Tachiarai, collectively with the city of Ogōri, contributes two members to the Fukuoka Prefectural Assembly. In terms of national politics, the town is part of the Fukuoka 6th district of the lower house of the Diet of Japan.

Tachiarai houses a Defense Intelligence Headquarters signals intelligence facility, which is used to monitor communications from transiting satellites, as part of a program codenamed MALLARD.

== Economy ==
The economy of Tachiarai is based on agriculture. Much of the land is used for growing rice and other crops. A substantial portion of the population commutes to Kurume or Fukuoka for work.

== Education ==
Tachiarai has four public elementary high schools and one public junior high school operated by the town government. The town does not have a high school.

== Transportation ==
=== Railways ===
Nishitetsu Amagi Line

- Hongō - Ōzeki

Amagi Railway Amagi Line

- Nishi-Tachiarai

=== Highways ===
- National Route 322
- National Route 500

== Local attractions ==
- Site of Tachiarai Airfield (the Tachiarai Peace Memorial Museum is located in neighboring Chikuzen)
- Shimotakahashi Kanga ruins, National Historic Site

== Notable people from Tachiarai ==
- Kentaro Koba, politician
