= Krivolak Military Training Center =

Military training base

Coordinates: 41°34′09.4″N 22°03′12.9″E

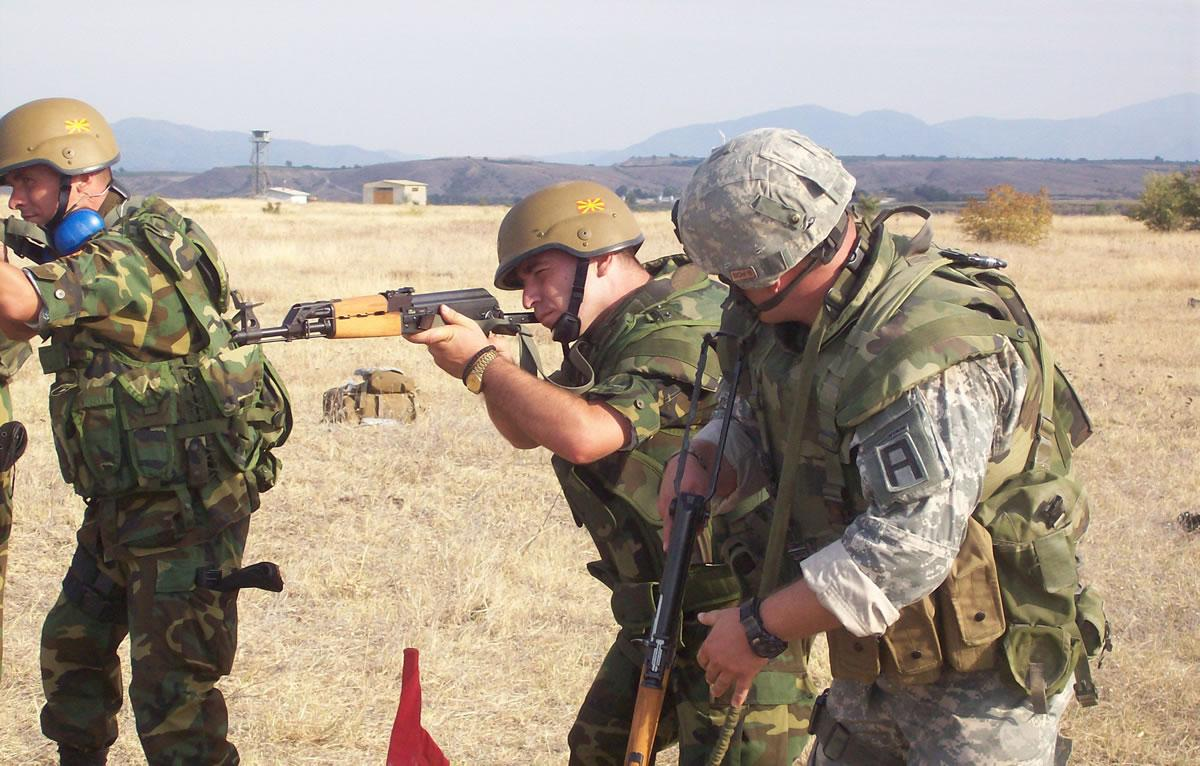
U.S. and Macedonian soldiers in a joint exercise in Krivolak.

The Krivolak Military Training Center is a regional military training center of the Macedonian army, located near the town of Negotino in central North Macedonia. Its surface is 22.546 hectares and is known as one of the biggest military centers in Southeast Europe. It was officially opened in 1970 and was used by the Yugoslav People's Army.

== Official website ==
- ARMY OF THE REPUBLIC OF NORTH MACEDONIA
