= Nishitetsu Amagi Line =

Railway line in Japan

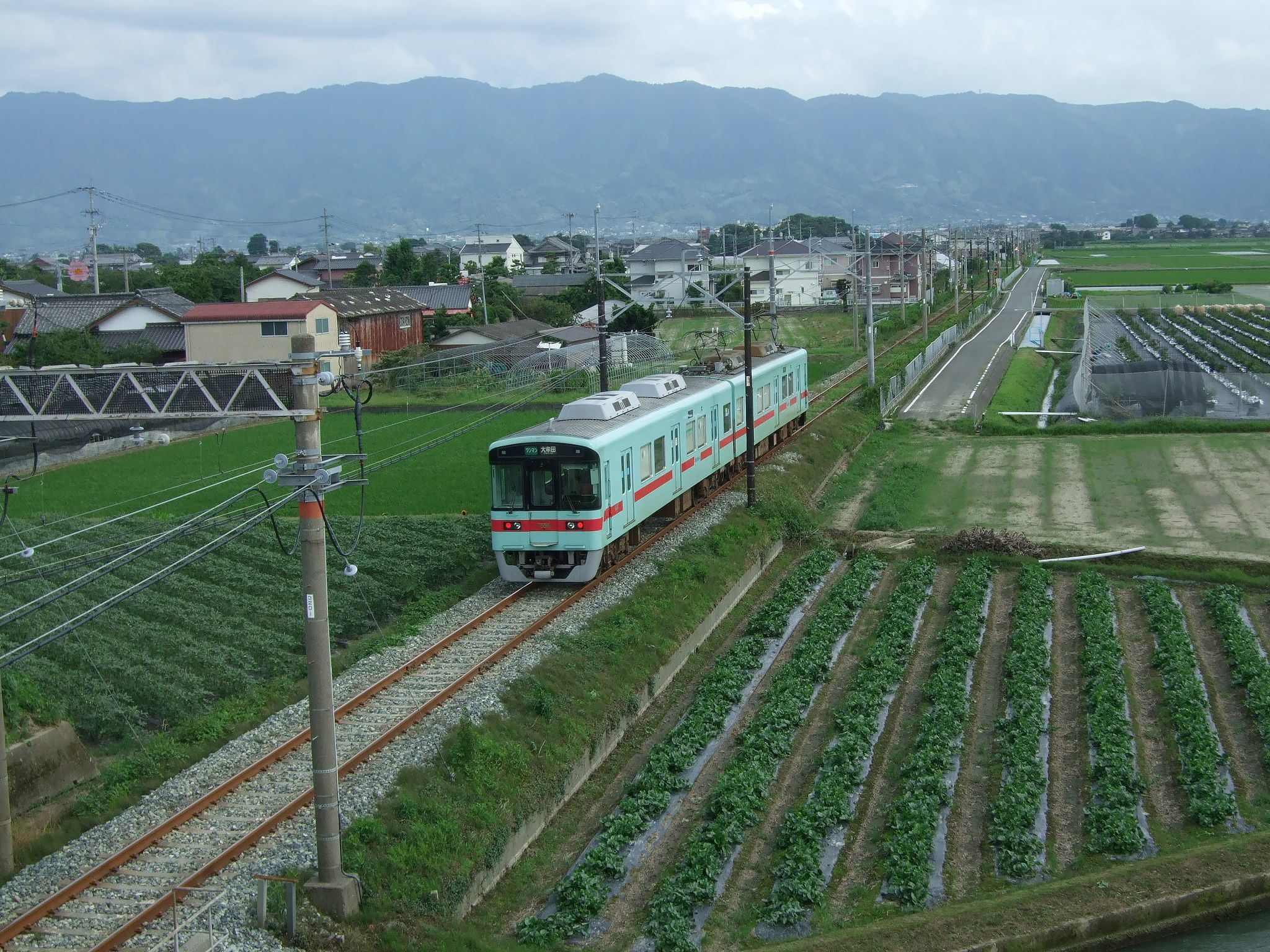
- Nishitetsu Amagi Line 7050 series EMU between Kaneshima and Ōzeki Station, July 2009

Overview
- Native name: 西鉄甘木線
- Owner: Nishi-Nippon Railroad
- Locale: Fukuoka Prefecture
- Termini: Miyanojin Station; Amagi Station
- Stations: 12

Service
- Type: Heavy rail

History
- Opened: October 15, 1915; 110 years ago

Technical
- Line length: 17.9 km (11.1 mi)
- Number of tracks: Single
- Track gauge: 1,435 mm (4 ft 8 1/2 in)
- Minimum radius: 130 m (430 ft)
- Electrification: 1,500 V DC
- Operating speed: 65 km/h (40 mph)

The Nishitetsu Amagi Line (西鉄甘木線, Nishitetsu Amagi-sen) is a Japanese railway line operated by the private railway operator Nishi-Nippon Railroad (Nishitetsu), which connects Miyanojin Station, Kurume and Amagi Station, Asakura in Fukuoka Prefecture.

== Services ==
All services on the Line are Local trains, stopping at every station.

As of August 2025, services operate approximately every 30 minutes between 05:30 and midnight every day, with a running time of between 31 and 40 minutes. At Miyanojin all services continue as a through service onto the Nishitetsu Tenjin Ōmuta Line towards Ōmuta.

== Stations ==
| Station name | Japanese | km | Transfers | Location | |
|---|---|---|---|---|---|
↑Through service to/from Ōmuta on the Nishitetsu Tenjin Ōmuta Line↑
| T 25 Miyanojin | 宮の陣 | 0.0 | Nishitetsu Tenjin Ōmuta Line | Kurume | Fukuoka Prefecture |
| A 11 Gorōmaru | 五郎丸 | 0.9 | | Kurume | Fukuoka Prefecture |
| A 10 Gakkōmae | 学校前 | 1.7 | | Kurume | Fukuoka Prefecture |
| A 09 Koganchaya | 古賀茶屋 | 3.9 | | Kurume | Fukuoka Prefecture |
| A 08 Kitano | 北野 | 5.4 | | Kurume | Fukuoka Prefecture |
| A 07 Ōki | 大城 | 8.0 | | Kurume | Fukuoka Prefecture |
| A 06 Kaneshima | 金島 | 9.4 | | Kurume | Fukuoka Prefecture |
| A 05 Ōzeki | 大堰 | 11.6 | | Tachiarai, Mii District | Fukuoka Prefecture |
| A 04 Hongō | 本郷 | 13.1 | | Tachiarai, Mii District | Fukuoka Prefecture |
| A 03 Kamiura | 上浦 | 14.9 | | Asakura | Fukuoka Prefecture |
| A 02 Mada | 馬田 | 16.1 | | Asakura | Fukuoka Prefecture |
| A 01 Amagi | 甘木 | 17.9 | Amagi Railway Amagi Line | Asakura | Fukuoka Prefecture |

== History ==
The Mitsui Electric Tramway (三井電気軌道, Mii Denki Kidō) opened a 1,435 mm (4 ft 8 1/2 in) gauge line electrified at 600 V DC from Miyanojin to Kitano in 1915. The Kitano to Amagi section opened in 1921.

On 30 June 1924, the Mitsui Electric tramway was absorbed into the Kyushu Railway system, this line becoming the Mitsui Line. In 1942, the Kyushu Railway merged with the Kyushu Electric Railway, becoming the Nishi-Nippon (translates as West Japan) Railway.

In 1948, the line voltage was increased to 1,500 V DC, the same year through-running commenced with the Tenjin Ōmuta Line and the line was renamed the Amagi Line.

From 1 October 1989, wanman driver only operation commenced on the line.
