= AC Montagnana =

Italian football club

Associazione Calcio Montagnana
- Nickname(s): Montagnana
- Founded: 1915
- Ground: Stadio Comunale
- League: Prima Categoria
- Website: http://www.acmontagnana.it
Home colours	Away colours

Associazione Calcio Montagnana is an Italian association football club in Montagnana in the Province of Padua. They have played in Serie C and Serie D, but now play in the Prima Categoria.
