= Miyanojin Station =

Railway station in Kurume, Fukuoka Prefecture, Japan

Miyanojin Station 宮の陣駅
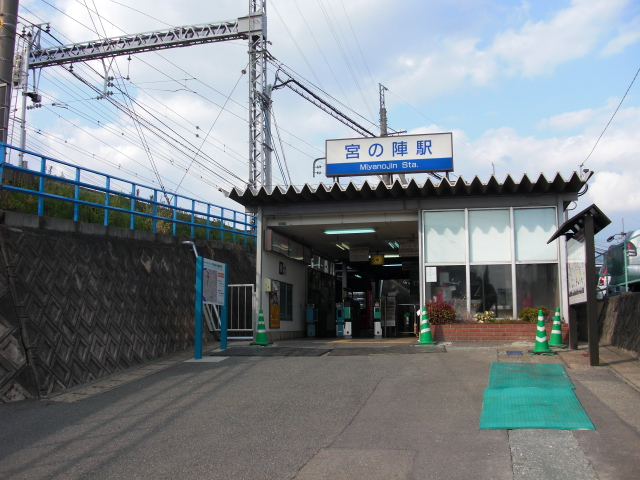
- Miyanojin Station building

General information
- Location: 5-chōme-2 Miyanojin, Kurume-shi, Fukuoka-ken 839-0801; Japan
- Coordinates: 33°19′43.85″N 130°31′50.03″E
- Operator: Nishi-Nippon Railroad
- Line: ■ Tenjin Ōmuta Line
- Distance: 36.5 km from Nishitetsu Fukuoka (Tenjin)
- Platforms: 1 side + 1 island platform
- Connections

Construction
- Structure type: At-grade

Other information
- Status: Staffed
- Station code: T25
- Website: Official website

History
- Opened: 12 April 1924

Passengers
- FY2022: 2066

Services
| Preceding station | Nishitetsu | Following station |
|---|---|---|
| Ajisaka towards Nishitetsu Fukuoka (Tenjin) | Tenjin Ōmuta Line Local | Kushiwara towards Ōmuta |
| Nishitetsu Ogōri towards Nishitetsu Fukuoka (Tenjin) | Tenjin Ōmuta Line Express | Nishitetsu Kurume towards Ōmuta |
| Terminus | Amagi Line | Gorōmaru towards Amagi |
Location
- Location within Fukuoka Prefecture Location within Japan

Miyanojin Station (宮の陣駅, Miyanojin-eki) is a junction passenger railway station located in the city of Kurume, Fukuoka, Japan. It is operated by the private transportation company Nishi-Nippon Railroad (NNR), and has station number T25.

== Lines ==
The station is served by the Nishitetsu Tenjin Ōmuta Line and is 36.5 kilometers from the starting point of the line at Nishitetsu Fukuoka (Tenjin) Station. It is also terminus of the Nishitetsu Amagi Line and is 17.9 kilometers from the opposing terminus of the line at Amagi.

== Station layout ==
The station consists of a one side platform and one "V"-shaped island platform, with the platform for the Amagi Line at a sharp angle to that of the Tenjin Ōmuta Line. The platforms are connected by a level crossing. The station is staffed.

== Platforms ==
| 1 | ■ Amagi Line | for Hongō and Amagi |
| 2 | ■ Tenjin Ōmuta Line | for Nishitetsu Kurume, Nishitetsu Yanagawa and Ōmuta |
| 3 | ■ Tenjin Ōmuta Line | for Nishitetsu Futsukaichi and Fukuoka |

== History ==
The station opened on 12 April 1924 as a station on the Kyushu Railway. The company merged with the Kyushu Electric Tramway on 19 September 1942. The company changed its name to Nishi-Nippon Railway three days later, on 22 September 1942.

== Passenger statistics ==
In fiscal 2022, the station was used by 2066 passengers daily.

== Surrounding area ==
- Miyanojin Shrine
- Chikugo Kokubun-ji
- Japan National Route 3

== See also ==
- List of railway stations in Japan
