= Nishi-Nippon Railroad =

Japanese railway company

Nishi-Nippon Railroad Co., Ltd.
- Native name: 西日本鉄道株式会社
- Romanized name: Nishinippon Tetsudō kabushiki gaisha
- Type: Public (kabushiki gaisha)
- Traded as: TYO: 9031; FSE: 9031
- Industry: Private railroad
- Founded: December 17, 1908
- Headquarters: Tenjin, Fukuoka, Japan
- Area served: Fukuoka Prefecture
- Key people: Koichi Hayashida (President and CEO)
- Owner: Bank of Fukuoka (4.91%); JR Kyushu (1.04%); Keihan Electric Railway (0.32%); Keisei Electric Railway (0.26%); Keikyu (0.16%)
- Website: www.nishitetsu.co.jp/en/index.html (in English)

Old Nishitetsu logo used between 1942 and 1996

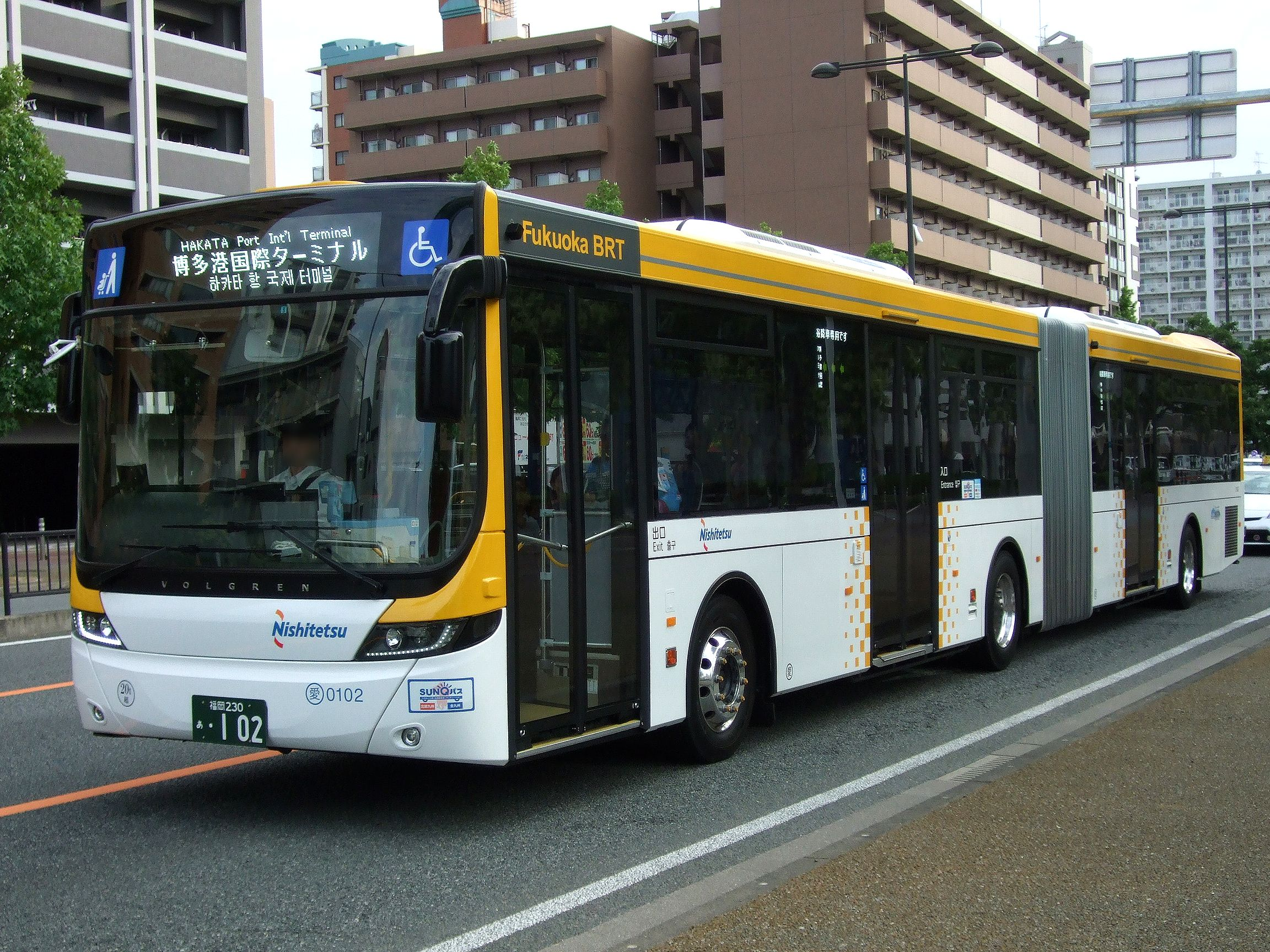
Nishitetsu operates the Fukuoka BRT.

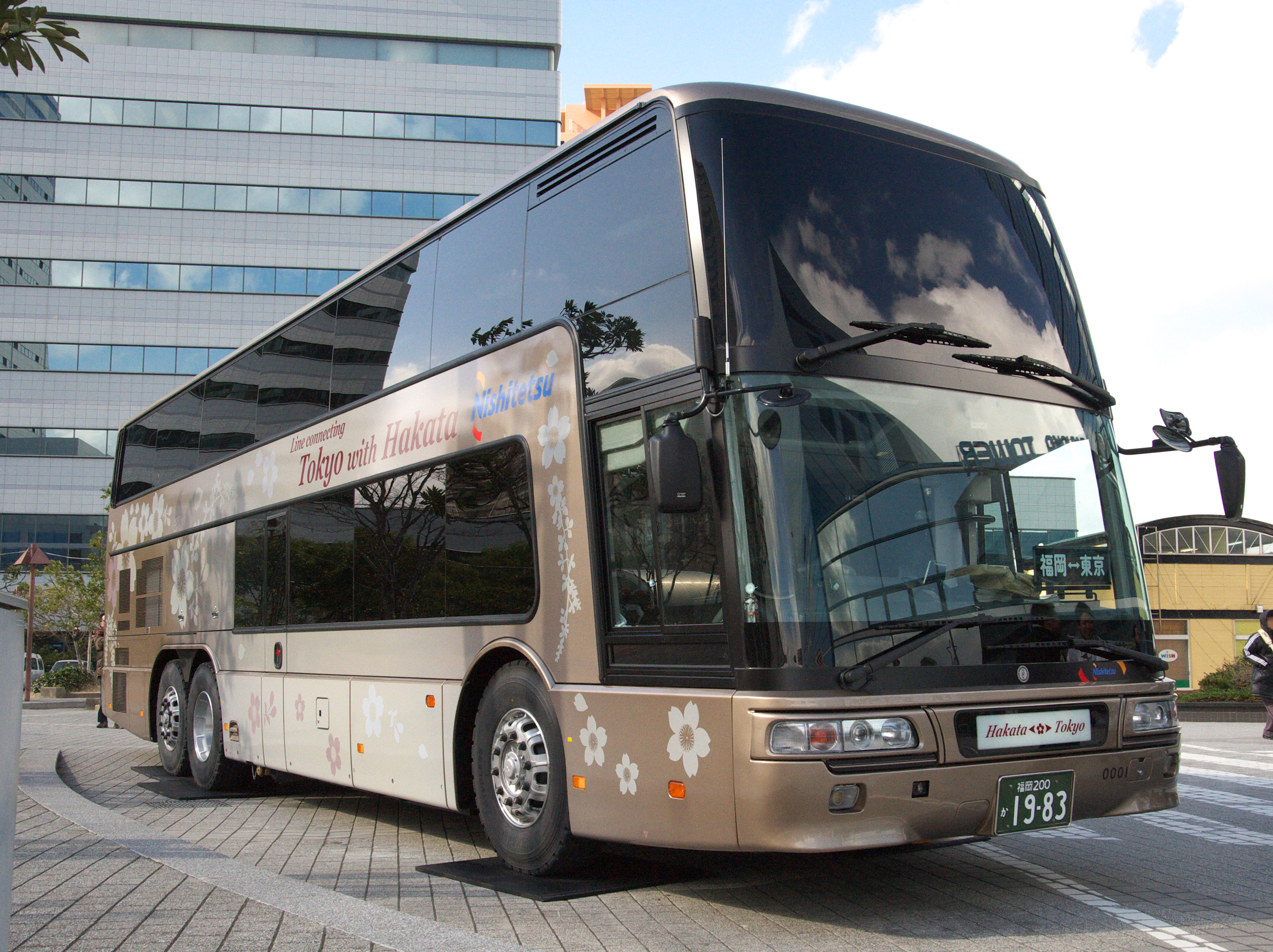
Nishitetsu Highway Bus

The Nishi-Nippon Railroad Company, Ltd. (西日本鉄道株式会社, Nishinippon Tetsudō Kabushiki-gaisha), also called Nishitetsu (西鉄) or NNR, TYO: 9031 is one of Japan's "Big 16" private railroad companies. With headquarters in Fukuoka, it operates local and highway buses, supermarkets, real estate and travel agencies, as well as railways in Fukuoka Prefecture. It also owns the Chikuhō Electric Railroad.

In addition, in 1943 the company owned the Nishitetsu Baseball Club, a team in the Japanese Baseball League. From 1950 to 1972, the company owned the Lions (in 1950, known as the Clippers), a Pacific League baseball team.

The company introduced nimoca, a smart card ticketing system, in May 2008.

== Routes ==
Line map

Nishi-Nippon Railroad operates four railway lines:

=== 1,435 mm (4 ft 8 1/2 in) (standard-gauge) ===
- T Tenjin Ōmuta Line - linking Nishitetsu Fukuoka (Tenjin) Station in Chūō-ku, Fukuoka and Ōmuta Station in Ōmuta (74.8 km)
- D Dazaifu Line - linking Nishitetsu Futsukaichi Station in Chikushino, Goto, and Dazaifu Station in Dazaifu (2.4 km)
- A Amagi Line - linking Miyanojin Station in Kurume and Amagi Station in Amagi, passing through Tachiarai (17.9 km)

=== 1,067 mm (3 ft 6 in) (narrow-gauge) ===
- NK Kaizuka Line - linking Kaizuka Station in Higashi-ku, Fukuoka, and Nishitetsu Shingū Station in Shingū (11.0 km)

Major local bus routes extend to Kitakyushu and serve other municipalities in the prefecture. Long-haul routes carry traffic to other prefectures in Kyushu, across the Kanmon Straits to Shimonoseki, and serve Osaka, Nagoya, and Shinjuku in Tokyo.

== Rolling stock ==
=== Active ===
==== Standard gauge ====
- 3000 series
- 5000 series
- 6000/6050 series
- 7000/7050 series
- 9000 series

==== Narrow gauge ====
- Nishitetsu 600 series

=== Retired ===
==== Standard gauge ====
- 700 series
- 1000 series
- 2000 series
- 8000 series

== Real estate investment ==
In 2015 Nishitetsu along with Hankyu Hanshin Holdings and a Vietnamese real estate company set up a joint venture to develop condominiums in Vietnam, initially in Ho Chi Minh City.

== See also ==
- Rail transport in Japan
