= Amagi Station =

Railway station in Amagi, Fukuoka Prefecture, Japan

Amagi Station (甘木駅, Amagi-eki) is a name shared by two separate passenger railway stations located close to each other in the city of Asakura, Fukuoka, Fukuoka Prefecture, Japan. The larger of the two stations is the eastern terminus of the Amagi Railway Amagi Line and is operated by the Amagi Railway (also called Amatetsu), a third sector public-private partnership corporation. Slightly to the east, about 150 metres away and just across a traffic roundabout is the northern terminus of the Nishitetsu Amagi Line which is operated by the private Nishi-Nippon Railroad (also called Nishitetsu).

== Amatetsu Amagi Station ==
Amagi Station 甘木駅
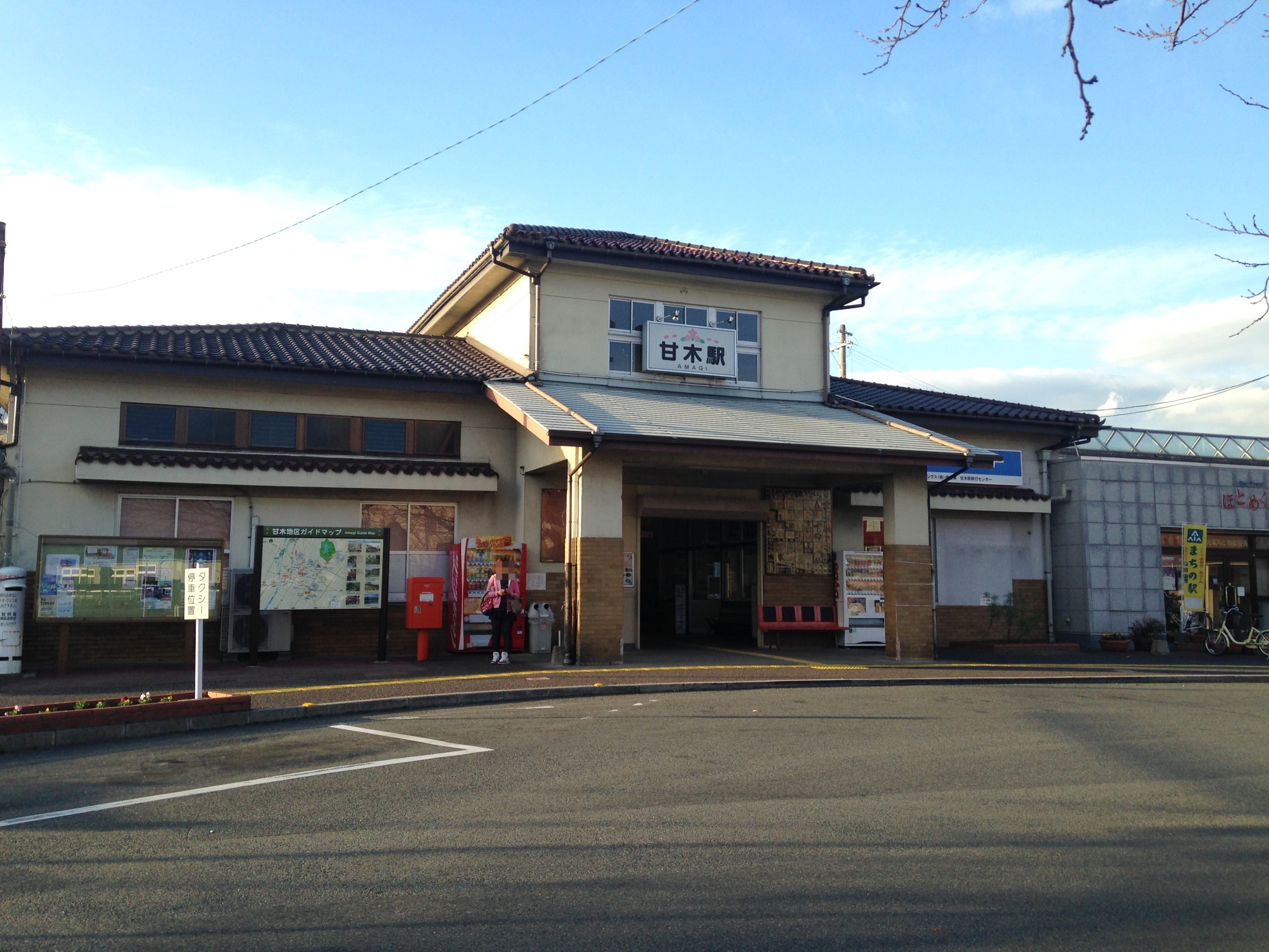
- Amatetsu Amagi Station building in 2015

General information
- Location: Amagi, Asakura-shi, Fukuoka-ken 838-0068; Japan
- Coordinates: 33°25′9″N 130°39′13″E
- Operator: Amagi Railway
- Line: ■ Amagi Line
- Distance: 13.7 km from Kiyama
- Platforms: 1 island platform
- Tracks: 2

Construction
- Structure type: At grade

History
- Opened: 28 April 1939

Passengers
- FY2021: 567
Location
- Location within Fukuoka Prefecture Location within Japan

=== Lines ===
Amatetsu Amagi Station is served by the Amagi Railway Amagi Line and is located 13.7 km from the start of the line at Kiyama.

=== Layout ===
The station consists of a one island platform serving two tracks at grade, connected to the station building by a level crossing.

=== Platforms ===
1, 2	■ Amagi Line	for Kiyama, and Ogōri

=== Adjacent stations ===
←	Service	→
Amagi Railway Amagi Line
Takata	Local	Terminus

=== History ===
Japanese Government Railways (JGR) opened the station on 28 April 1939 as the eastern terminus of its Amagi Line from Kiyama. On 1 April 1986, control of the station was handed over to the Amagi Railway.

== Nishitetsu Amagi Station ==
Amagi Station 甘木駅
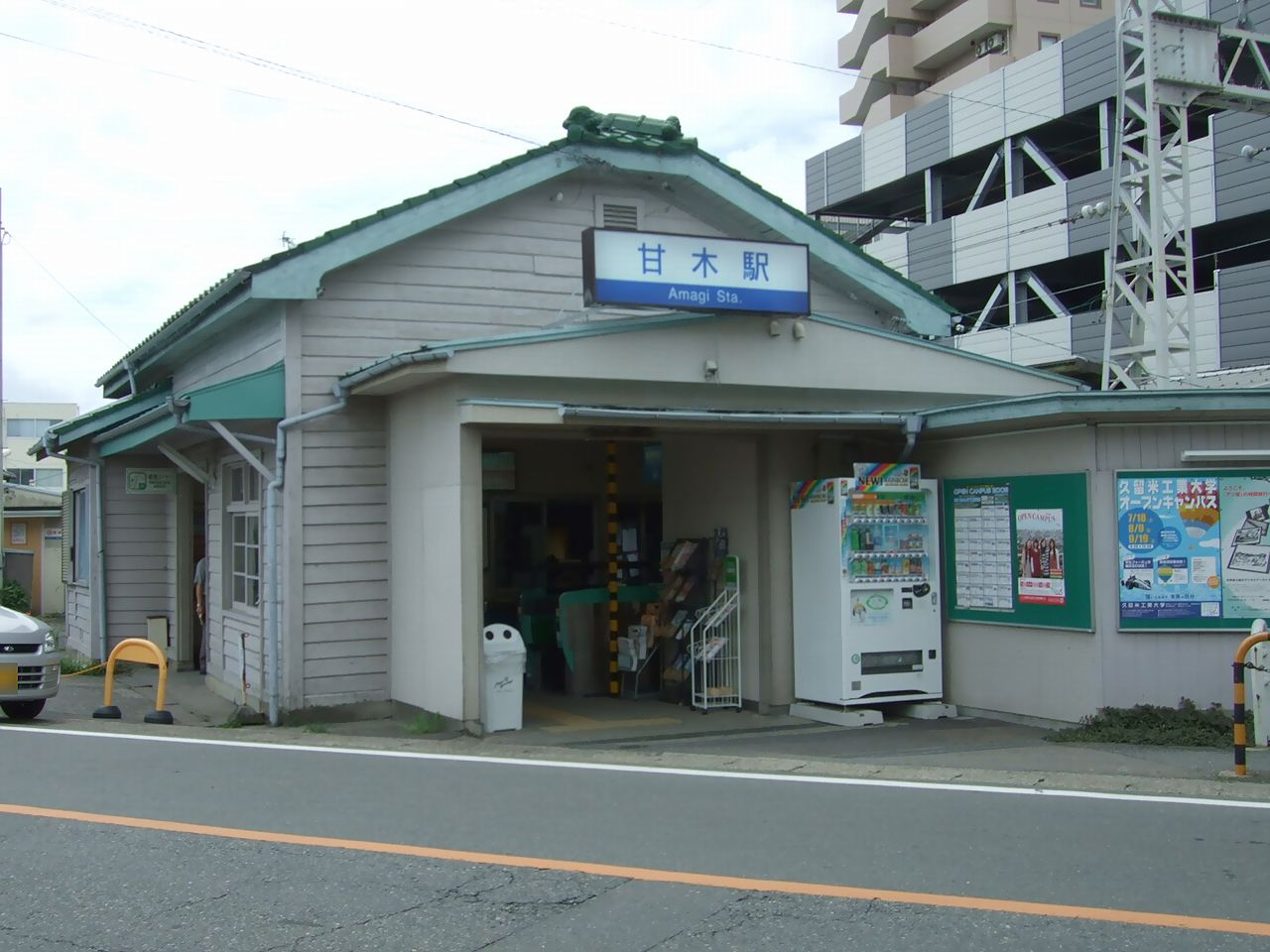
- Nishitetsu Amagi Station in 2009

General information
- Location: Amagi, Asakura-shi, Fukuoka-ken 838-0068; Japan
- Coordinates: 33°25′6″N 130°39′18.67″E
- Operator: Nishi-Nippon Railroad
- Line: ■ Amagi Line
- Distance: 17.9 km from Miyanojin
- Platforms: 1 island platform
- Tracks: 2

Construction
- Structure type: At grade

Other information
- Station code: A01

History
- Opened: 8 December 1921

Passengers
- FY2022: 1163

Services
Preceding station	Nishitetsu	Following station
Mada towards Miyanojin	Amagi Line	Terminus
Location
- Location within Fukuoka Prefecture Location within Japan

=== Lines ===
The Nishitetstu Amagi Station is the terminus of the Nishitetsu Amagi Line and is 17.9 kilometers from the opposing terminus of the line at Miyanojin.

=== Station layout ===
The station consists of one island platform at grade, connected to the station building by a level crossing.

=== History ===
The station opened on 8 December 1921 as a station on the Mitsui Electric Tramway. The company merged with the Kyushu Railway in 1924, which in turn merged with the Kyushu Electric Tramway on 19 September 1942. The company changed its name to Nishi-Nippon Railway three days later, on 22 September 1942.

=== Passenger statistics ===
In fiscal 2022, the station was used by 1163 passengers daily.

== Surrounding area ==
- Asakura City Hall (formerly Amagi City Hall)
- Fukuoka Family Court Amagi Branch Office/Amagi Summary Court
- Fukuoka Prefectural Asakura High School
- Fukuoka Prefectural Asakura Higashi High School
- Asakura City Amagi Elementary School
