= Chikugo Kokufu =

Archaeological site in Kurume, Fukuoka, Japan

Chikugo Provincial Capital Site
- 筑後国府跡 (Japanese)
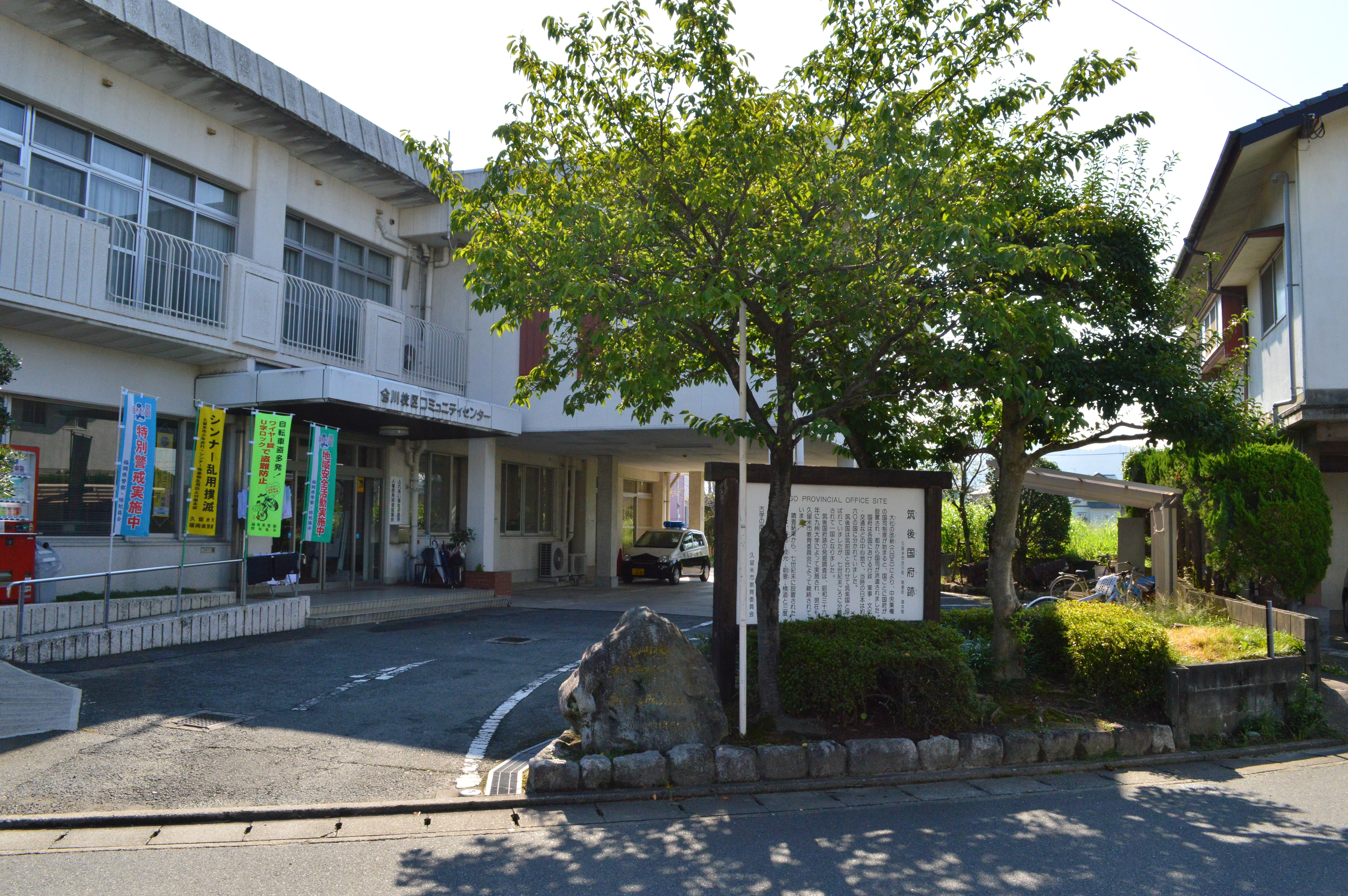
- Chikugo Provincial Capital Site

- Chikugo Provincial Capital Site Chikugo Kokufu (Japan)
- 33°18′29″N 130°32′35″E
- Type: Settlement
- Location: Kurume, Fukuoka, Japan
- Region: Kyushu

History
- Built: Nara period

Site notes
- Condition: ruins
- Public access: Yes (no public facilities)
- National Historic Site of Japan

The Chikugo Provincial Capital Site (筑後国府跡, Chikugo Kokufu ato) is an archaeological site consisting of the ruins of the Nara period to early Heian period Provincial Capital of Chikugo Province, located across the Aikawa, Asatsuma, and Mii neighborhoods of the city of Kurume, Fukuoka, Japan. The site was designated a National Historic Site of Japan in 1996, with the area under protection expanded in 2007.

== Overview ==
Following the Taika Reform (645 AD) which aimed at a centralization of the administration following the Chinese model (ritsuryō), provincial capitals were established in the various provinces, headed by an official titled kokushi, who replaced the older Kuni no miyatsuko. With a square layout, the provincial capitals were patterned after the Capital of Japan, first Fujiwara-kyō and then Heijō-kyō, which in turn were modelled on the Tang capital Chang'an, but on a much, much smaller scale. Each had office buildings for administration, finance, police and military and the official building of the governor, as well as granaries for tax rice and other taxable produce. In the periphery there was the provincial temple (kokubun-ji), and nunnery (kokubun-niji) and the garrison. This system collapsed with the growth of feudalism in the Late Heian period, and the location of many of the provincial capitals is now lost.

The Chikugo Provincial Capital was located on a low plateau on the left bank of the downstream where the Chikugo River, which flows westward on the south side of the Chikugo Plain, changes its flow significantly to the south. The existence of the kokufu ruins at this location was speculated by scholars of Kurume Domain in the Edo Period. During archaeological excavations in 1961, relics such as the remains of an enclosure containing the foundations of a dug-out pillar buildings, roof tiles, and a circular ink stone were discovered, indicating that a large-scale government office was operated in the area during the Nara period. Further excavations from 1972 confirmed that the complex had been reconstructed at four locations at different times. The first phase was in the late 7th century, and the complex showed a strong military flavor, with deep moats. It is speculated that this phase pre-dates the start of the kokufu system, and may have been related to the capital of Tsukushi Province before its division. The second phase was from the mid-8th century. The complex includes a Buddhist temple and workshops. This complex was destroyed by fire around the time of Fujiwara no Sumitomo's rebellion. The third phase is from the early 10th century, during which time the complex greatly expanded and was even larger than the Dazaifu complex which was the civil authority over all of Kyushu. The fourth and final phase was from the late 11th century. It was on a much smaller scale, and it disappears from the documentary record in the late 12th century.

Plans are underway to preserve the site as the Chikugo Kokufu Ruins Historical Park. It is located about a five-minute walk from Daigakumae Station on the JR Kyushu Kyudai Main Line.

== See also ==
- List of Historic Sites of Japan (Fukuoka)
