= Kōra-san Kōgoishi =

Castle ruins in Kurume, Fukuoka, Japan

Kōra-san kōgoshi
- 高良山神籠石
- Kurume, Fukuoka, Fukuoka Prefecture, Japan
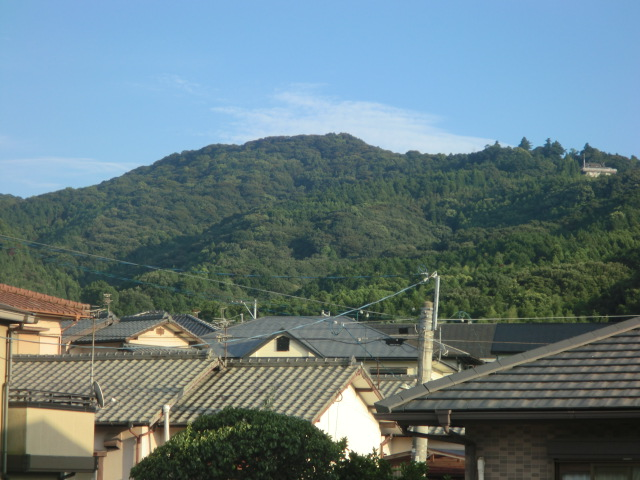
- Kōra-san kōgoshi

Site information
- Type: Korean-style fortress
- Condition: Ruins

Location
- Coordinates: 33°18′12″N 130°33′44″E

Site history
- Built by: Yamato court
- In use: Asuka period
- Kōra-san Kōgoishi (Fukuoka Prefecture) Kōra-san Kōgoishi (Japan) National Historic Site of Japan

Kōra-san kōgoshi (高良山神籠石) was an ancient castle (also known as a Korean-style fortresses in Japan (朝鮮式山城, Chōsen-shiki yamajiro) located in the Mii neighborhood of the city of Kurume, Fukuoka Prefecture Japan. Its ruins have been protected as a National Historic Site since 1953, with the area under protection expanded in 1976 and again in 1989. It is also referred to as the Kōra-san castle ruins (高良山城跡) , as modern historians tend to discredit earlier theories that similar sites (i.e. kōgoishi were primarily religious in nature).

== History ==
After the defeat of the combined Baekje and Yamato Japan forces, at the hands of the Silla and Tang China alliance at the Battle of Hakusukinoe in 663, the Yamato court feared an invasion from either or both Tang or Silla. In response, a huge network of shore fortifications was constructed throughout the rest of the 600s, often with the assistance of Baekje engineers, generals and artisans. Unaware of the outbreak of the Silla-Tang War (670–676), the Japanese would continue to build fortifications until 701, even after finding out that Silla was no longer friendly with Tang.

The Kōra-san ruins are located on Mount Kōra, at an elevation of 312.3 meters above sea level, which protrudes like a cape into the Chikushi Plain in southern Fukuoka Prefecture. The fortification is not mentioned in any known literature or historical documentation, so its actual name, and date of construction are unknown.The fortification encloses the top of Mount Kōra, including two valleys. According to the archaeological excavations, it is estimated that the fortifications were built around the latter half of the 7th century. The total length of the fortifications is approximately 1550 meters and included two water gates (one of which has been destroyed). The eastern series of walls is located behind the Kōra taisha shrine, and consists of rectangular parallelepiped schist stones arranged in a row, measuring 70 to 80 centimeters in height and depth and approximately one meter in width. These rows of stones were used as retaining stones at the foot of earthworks made using rammed earth method, but most of the earthworks have now been washed away. Only the rows of stones at the base of the earthworks remain in good condition.

Kōra-san ruins were the center of the kōgoishi theory advanced by the Meiji period archaeologist Tsuboi Shōgorō, who conjectured that the stone walls served as spiritual or practical protection for sacred sites, rather than as a fortification. Mount Kōra was regarded as a sacred mountain since ancient times. The low walls with simple stonework and incomplete encirclement of the mountain, lack of any evidence of building structures, as well as its lack of mention in the Nihon Shoki or other contemporary documents were all cited as supporting evidence. of the now largely discredited kōgoishi theory that the site is a sacred site rather than a fortification. Scholars after Tsuboi determined that the structures are most likely the remains of practical, military fortifications, and were unlikely to have significant spiritual connections. The style and form of the ruins matches many in Korea; the period when these were built was one of flourishing contact with Korea, and it is theorized that Korean stoneworkers, artisans, and architects may have played a role in the construction of these fortresses. Many scholars believe that some kōgoishi were built in anticipation of an attack from Korea, which never materialized.

It is estimated that the Kōra-san ruins were built around the 6th or 7th century, and is located on a strategic point which overlooks the site of the provincial capital of Chikugo Province, the Saikaidō highway and the Chikugo River. It is surrounded by other mountain-top fortifications built in a similar style and around the same time, including the Zoyama Kōgoishi to the south. It is theorized that this might be the fortification mentioned in the Nihon Shoki in an entry dated 658 during the reign of Empress Saimei. As the northern half of the fortifications have not been found, it is further speculated that they were destroyed by the Tsukushi Earthquake of January 679, lending credence to this theory. Kōra taisha, which the fortifications enclosure, is mentioned in literature from 795, and archaeological evidence suggests that the shrine was established before the Nara period.

Related materials are on display at the Kōra Taisha Treasure Museum.

== See also ==
- List of Historic Sites of Japan (Fukuoka)
- List of foreign-style castles in Japan
- Kōgoishi

== Literature ==
- De Lange, William (2021). An Encyclopedia of Japanese Castles. Groningen: Toyo Press. pp. 600 pages. ISBN 978-9492722300.
- Motoo, Hinago (1986). Japanese Castles. Tokyo: Kodansha. pp. 200 pages. ISBN 0-87011-766-1.
