= Bairin-ji (Kurume) =

Buddhist temple in Kurume, Fukuoka prefecture, Japan

Bairin-ji (Zen Temple) 梅林寺
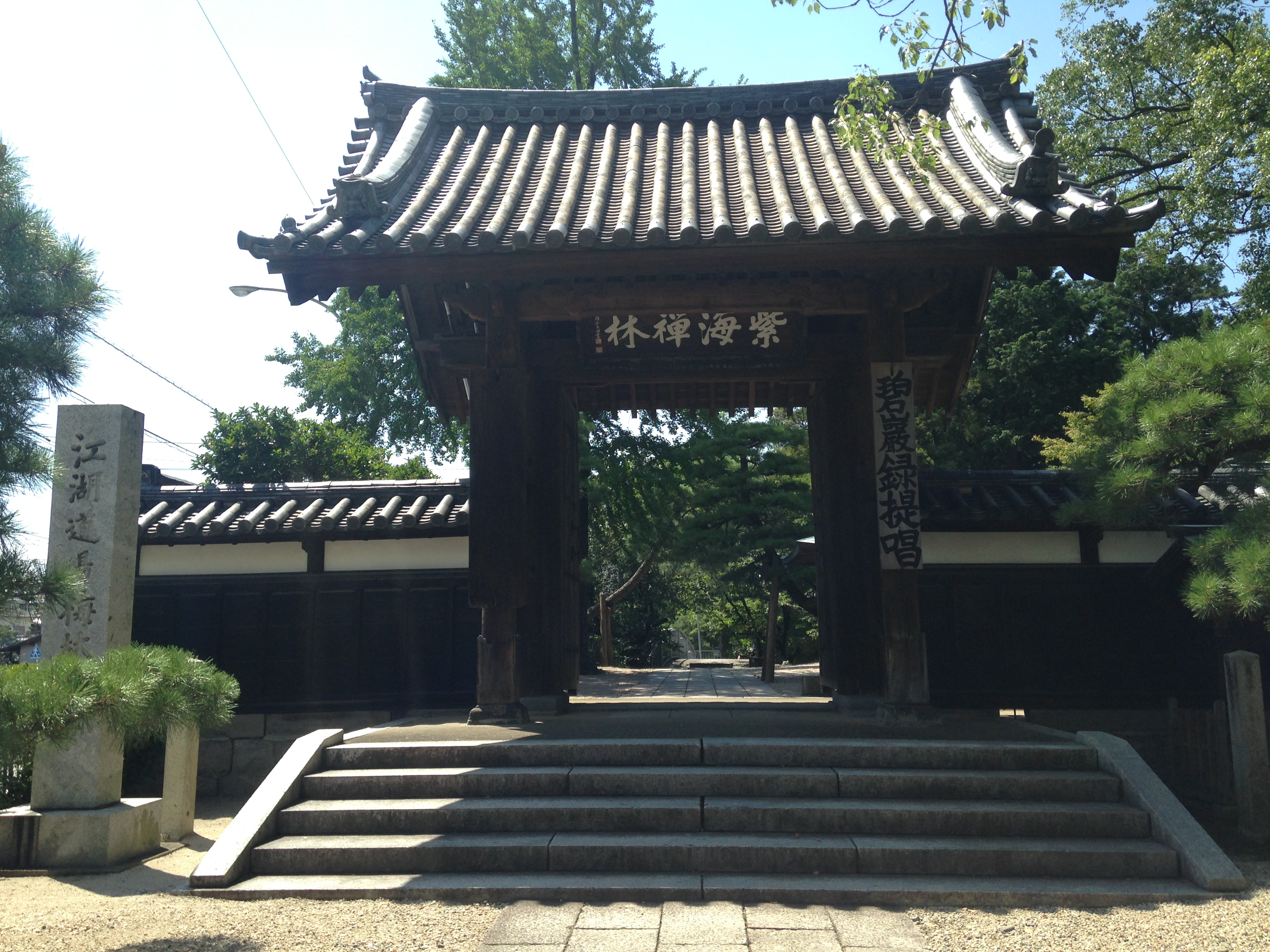
- Main Gate (sanmon gate) of Bairin-ji

- Location within Fukuoka Prefecture Location within Japan

Religion
- Affiliation: Buddhism
- Deity: Nyoirin Kannon
- Rite: Rinzai school (Myōshin-ji-branch)

Location
- Location: Kyo-machi 209, Kurume-shi, Fukuoka-ken 830-0028
- Country: Japan
- Coordinates: 33°19′23.6″N 130°29′58.2″E}

Architecture
- Founder: Arima Toyōji
- Completed: 1621

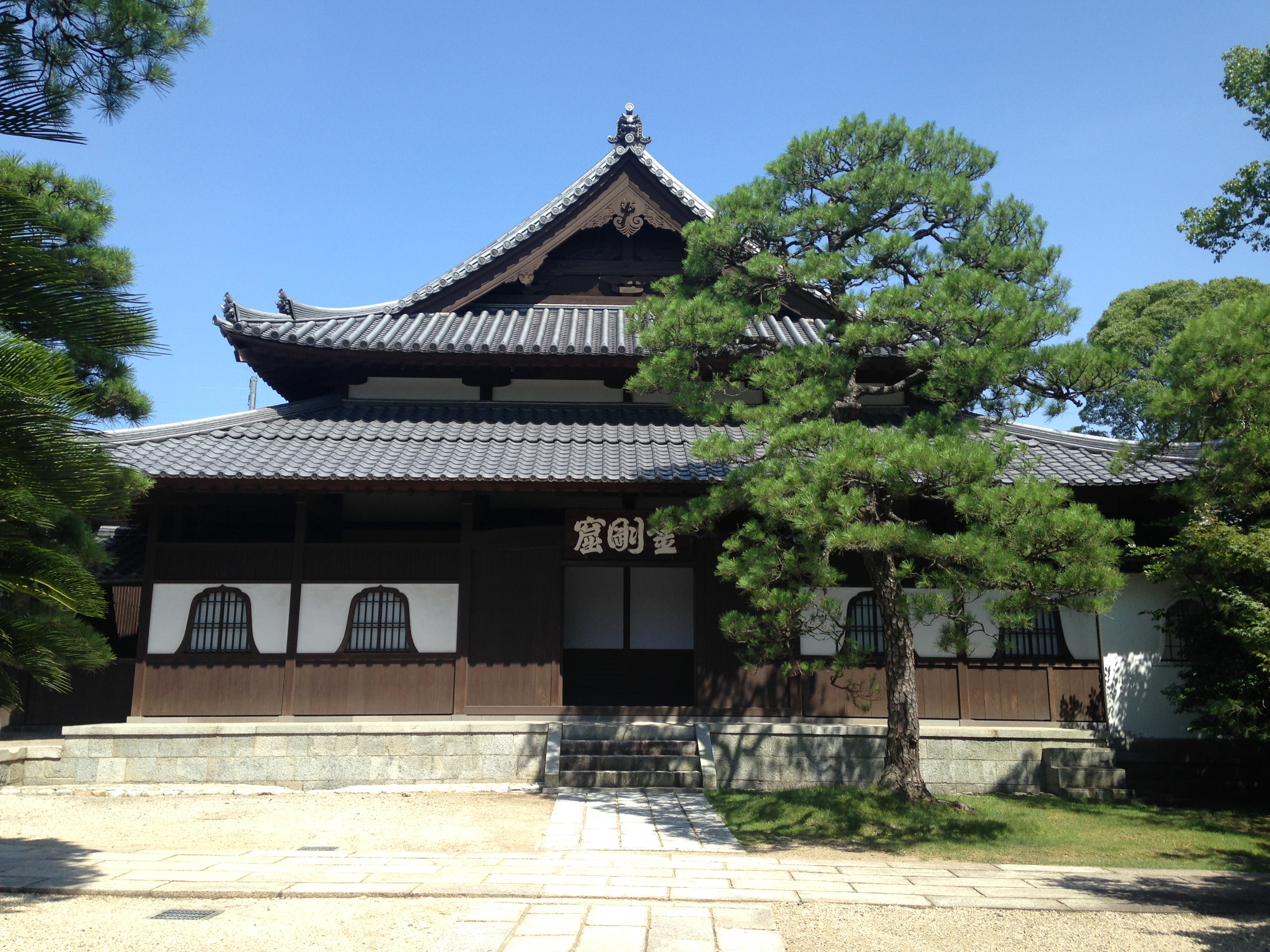
The Zen Hall of Bairin-ji

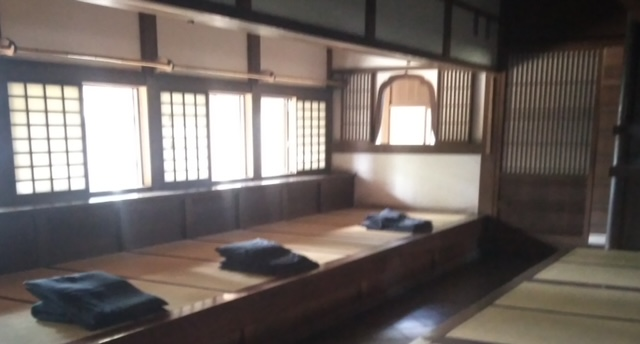
Inside of The Meditation Hall

Bairin-ji (梅林寺) is a Rinzai temple in Kurume, Fukuoka Prefecture, Japan. Its honorary sangō prefix is Kōnanzan (江南山). It is known as a representative training dojo temple of the Myōshin-ji school.

== History ==
This temple was the bodaiji of the Arima clan and originally located in Fukuchiyama in the Tanba Province, where it was called Zuigan-ji (瑞巌寺). In 1620, when Arima Toyōji was transferred from Fukuchiyama Domain to Kurume Domain in Chikugo Province, he relocated the temple to his new domain and named it Dairyū-ji (大龍寺). It was later renamed to Bairin-ji which is associated with his father Noriyori's posthumous name, Bairin'in-den (梅林院殿) and became a mausoleum of the successive daimyō of the domain. It is located in the western end of Kurume city, next to the Chikugo River.

Part of the Lower Garden of Bairinji Temple

Along with Shōgen-ji in Gifu Prefecture, Bairin-ji was regarded one of the most rigorous and demanding Zen training monasteries (修行道場) in Japan. However, with the start of the Meiji period the temple fell into disrepair with the loss of the Arima clan patronage and with the new government's haibutsu kishaku movement against Buddhism. It was reopened in year 1879 by Masters Sanseiken (三生軒) and Toukaiyuzen (東海猷禅), who served as chief priests (abbot).

To the Left and Right of the Main Entrance, There are Pathes That Lead to Side Entrances

The temple is regained today a main zen temple, and the main training temple of the Rinzai Sect in Kyushu, where regular meditation is practiced and taught to monks and lay people.

== Cultural properties ==
The temple is a treasure trove of some 600 cultural assets. The collection includes the 14th century ‘’Shaka Triad’’ silken hanging scroll in Japanese called as Shaka Sanzon (釈迦三尊) [for a link to the image see the “External links” section] and a painting of Mt. Fuji by renowned Edo-period painter Ogata Korin (1658–1716). Other Edo period cultural assets in the temple include folding screens from Tohaku Hasegawa, and fusuma (Japanese sliding door) paintings in the Kano style. The colored silk wooden Avalokiteśvara statue in the main hall is the work of the Kamakura period.

== Garden and plum blossoms ==
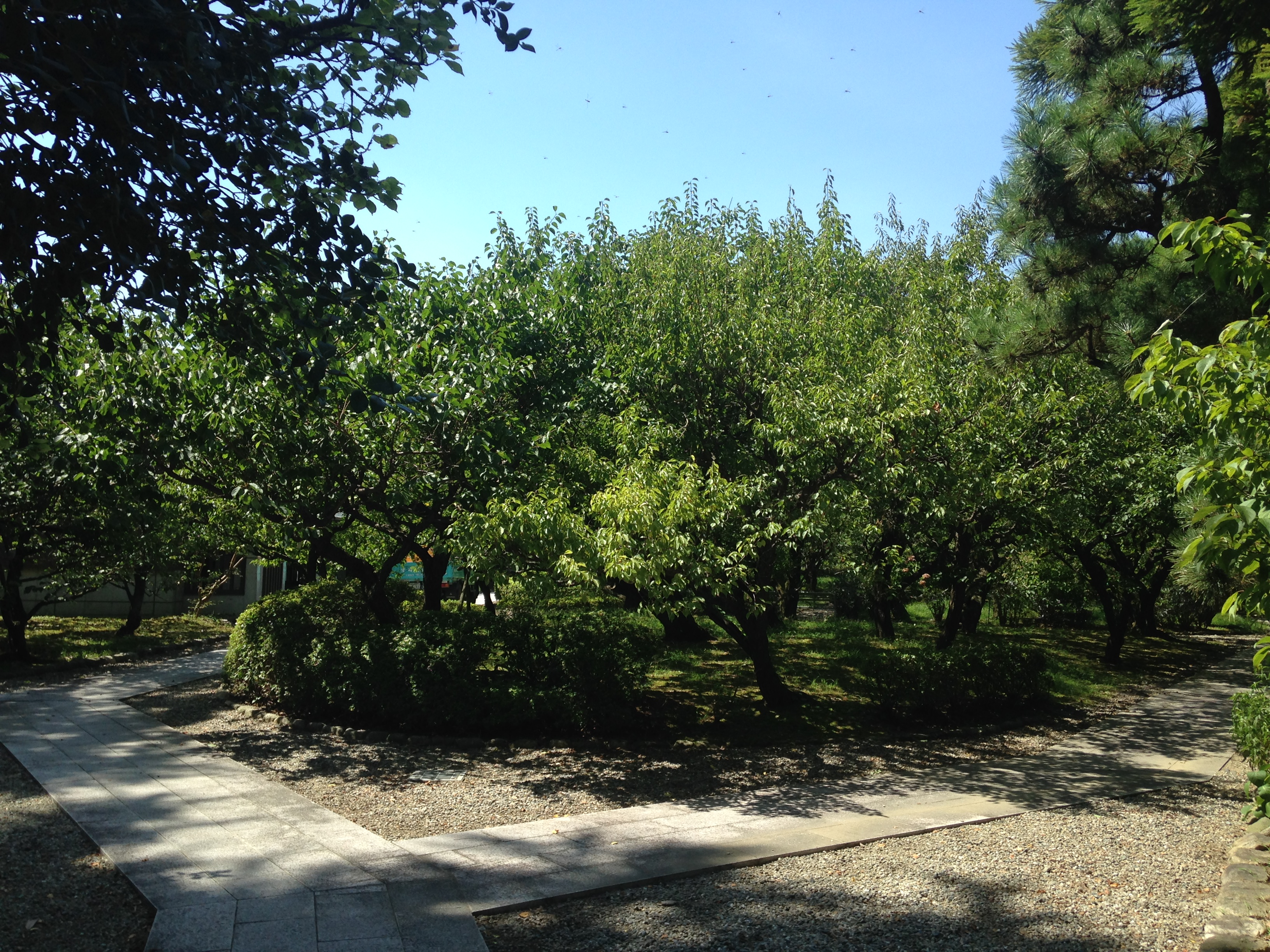
Plum Garden at Bairin-ji

The Gaien (外苑) is a garden which is adjacent to Chikugo River side to the north side. Approximately 30 species of 500 plums donated by the citizens, and many azaleas are planted in the garden. It was opened as a park in 1958 to commemorate the 350 years old of the founding priest, Umon Genkyū Zenji (禹門玄級禅師).

Stained Glass Window of Kurume JR Station Depicting the Main Gate of Bairinji Temple, Plum Blossoms and the Annual Fireworks

Stained Glass Art at Kurume JR Station

The temple's name, Bairinji, translates to Plum Grove Temple. The plum trees, flower mid-February to mid-March, adding a streak of pink and white to the temple grounds. The blossoms are quite fragrant, and many visitors go to the temple to enjoy a cup of tea and sweets beneath the flowering trees.

== Arima clan cemetery ==
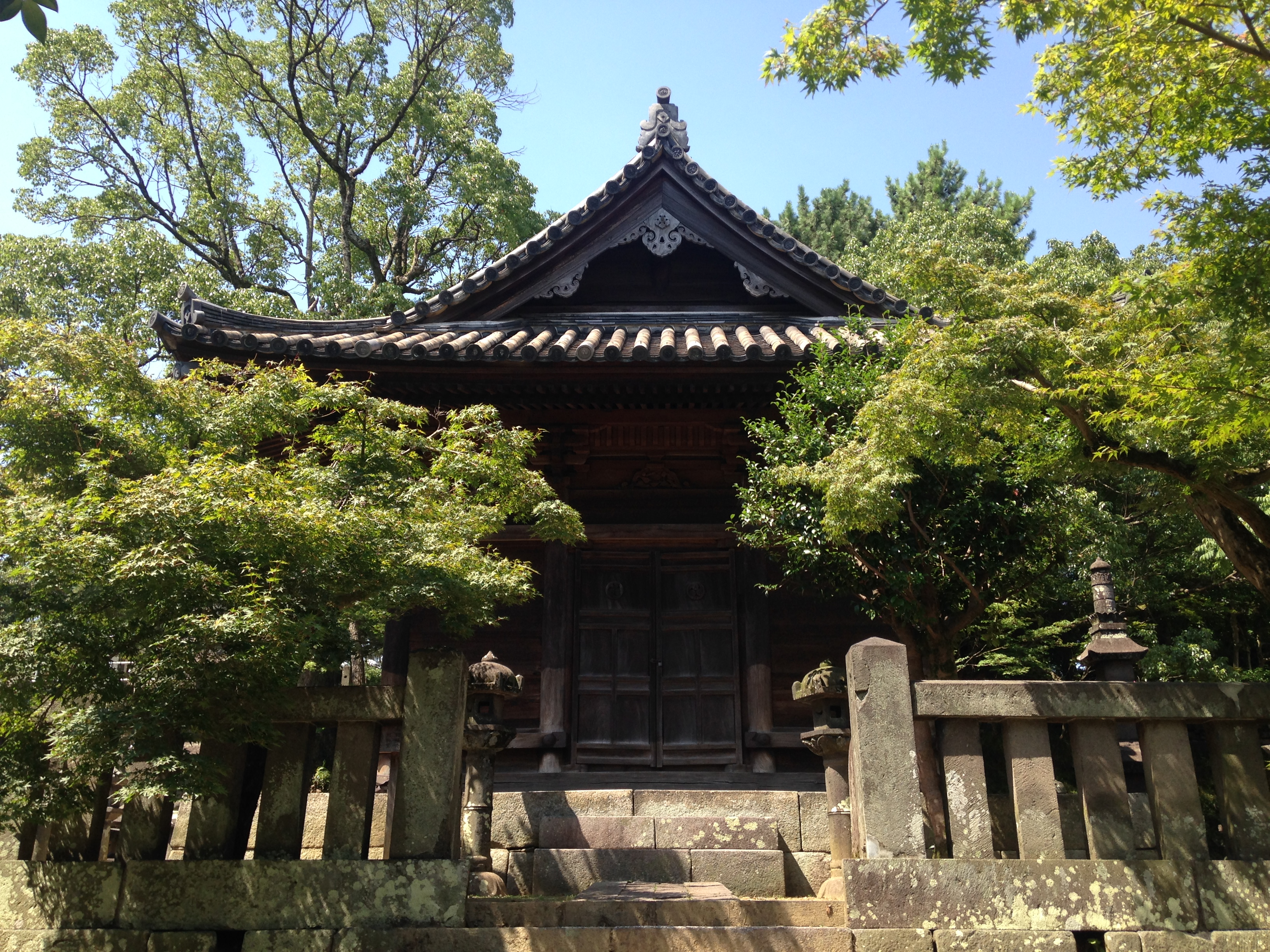
The Mausoleum of Arima clan

On the grounds of Bairin-ji is a cemetery with the graves of the Edo period Arima clan daimyō of Kurume Domain and their families, as well as their deceased vassals. This was designated a National Historic Site in 2021. It was the practice of the Arima clan to construct the grave of a daimyō who died while in residence in Kurume at Bairin-ji, whereas if he died while on sankin kōtai duties in Edo, the grave would be erected at the clan's Edo bodai-ji of Shoun-ji in Hiroo. Thus at Bairin-ji are the graves of the 1st daimyō, Arima Toyouji, the 2nd daimyō, Arima Tagayori, the 7th daimyō Arima Yoriyuki and the 10th daimyō Arima Yorinaga.

The cemetery contains five memorial chapels, all constructed between 1630–1655. These structures were designated National Important Cultural Properties in 2018.

== Sub-temple ==
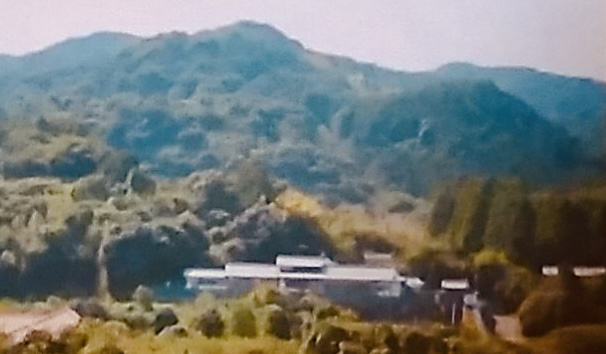
Bird view of Yamamoto Bairinji Sub-temple in the Mino Mountains (postcard)

There are several temples in Fukuoka, Saga and Kumamoto Prefectures that are closely related to Bairinji Temple. Mostly for the fact that they also belong to the Myoshin-ji Sect and their respective abbots trained at Bairinji. However, the only temple that is a direct sub-temple is a temple that also bears, for the very reason, a partly identical name:

• Yamamoto Bairinji(梅林寺山本分院) is located ten kilometers to the West of its mother temple, in Yamamoto Village at the foot of the rugged Mino Mountains.

== See also ==
- List of Historic Sites of Japan (Fukuoka)
