= Ontsuka - Gongenzuka Kofun =

Historic Japanese Burial Mounds

Ontsuka・Gongenzuka Kofun
- 御塚・権現塚古墳 (Japanese)
- Ontsuka・Gongenzuka Kofun Ontsuka - Gongenzuka Kofun (Japan)
- Interactive map of Ontsuka・Gongenzuka Kofun
- 33°16′48″N 130°28′40″E
- Type: Kofun
- Periods: Kofun period
- Location: Kurume, Fukuoka, Japan
- Region: Kyushu

History
- Built: c.5th to 6th century

Site notes
- Public access: Yes (no facilities)

The Ontsuka・Gongenzuka Kofun (御塚・権現塚古墳) are a pair of Kofun period burial mounds, located in the Miyamoto, Daizenji neighborhood of the city of Kurume, Fukuoka Prefecture Japan. The tumulus pair was designated a National Historic Site of Japan in 1931, with the area under protection expanded in 1979.

== Overview ==
The Ontsuka・Gongenzuka Kofun are located close to a low plateau on the left bank of the Chikugo River west of downtown Kurume. These two burial mounds were the central tombs of a cluster of more than 40 kofun that once existed near Daizenji-cho. Fragments of cylindrical clay haniwa were found in both tumuli, indicating that both were built around the same time in the late 5th century to early 6th century. These tumuli are believed to be that of the local ruling clan, the "Minuma no Kimi", which is mentioned in the Nihon Shoki.

Ontsuka Kofun

The southwestern Ontsuka Kofun is a scallop-shaped (帆立型古墳, hotate-gata kofun). Archaeological excavations in 1970 revealed that the main axis of the mound is 76 meters long, the diameter of the posterior circular portion is 67 meters with a height of 10 meters, and the width of the anterior rectangular part is 22.5 meters. It is estimated that it was built around the 5th century. A sketch by Yano Kazusada, a scholar of Kurume Domain who surveyed the area in 1848, shows that it was surrounded by a triple moat and had a total length about 130 meters.The three layers of outer moats and outer embankments around the outer periphery have been confirmed by modern archaeology, and the outer diameter of the outer embankment was confirmed to be 123 meters. The inside of the tomb is unknown, but as the top of the tumulus has been largely destroyed, so it is thought that to have been robbed in antiquity.

Gongenzuka Kofun

The Gongenzuka Kofun is located immediately to the northeast of the Ontsuka Kofun. It is a round enpun (円墳)-style tumulus surrounded by a double moat, with an outer embankment of approximately 150 meters in diameter. The tumulus itself is 55 meters in diameter, with a height of nine meters. The outer moat is partially reclaimed and can be crossed, but the inner moat is intact. Although pieces of haniwa and pottery have been found on the inner embankment, there is a lack of materials to determine the construction date of the tomb itself, and as it has never been excavated, and its internal structure is unknown.

Currently, the site is maintained as a park. It is approximately 15 minutes on foot from Daizenji Station on the Nishitetsu Tenjin Ōmuta Line.

== See also ==
- List of Historic Sites of Japan (Fukuoka)
- Decorated kofun
