= Kyukodai =

Kyukodai may refer to:

- Kurume Institute of Technology
- Kyushu Institute of Technology
