= Kurume Shin-Ai Women's College =

Private women's junior college in Kurume, Fukuoka, Japan

Coordinates: 33°17′46″N 130°33′03″E

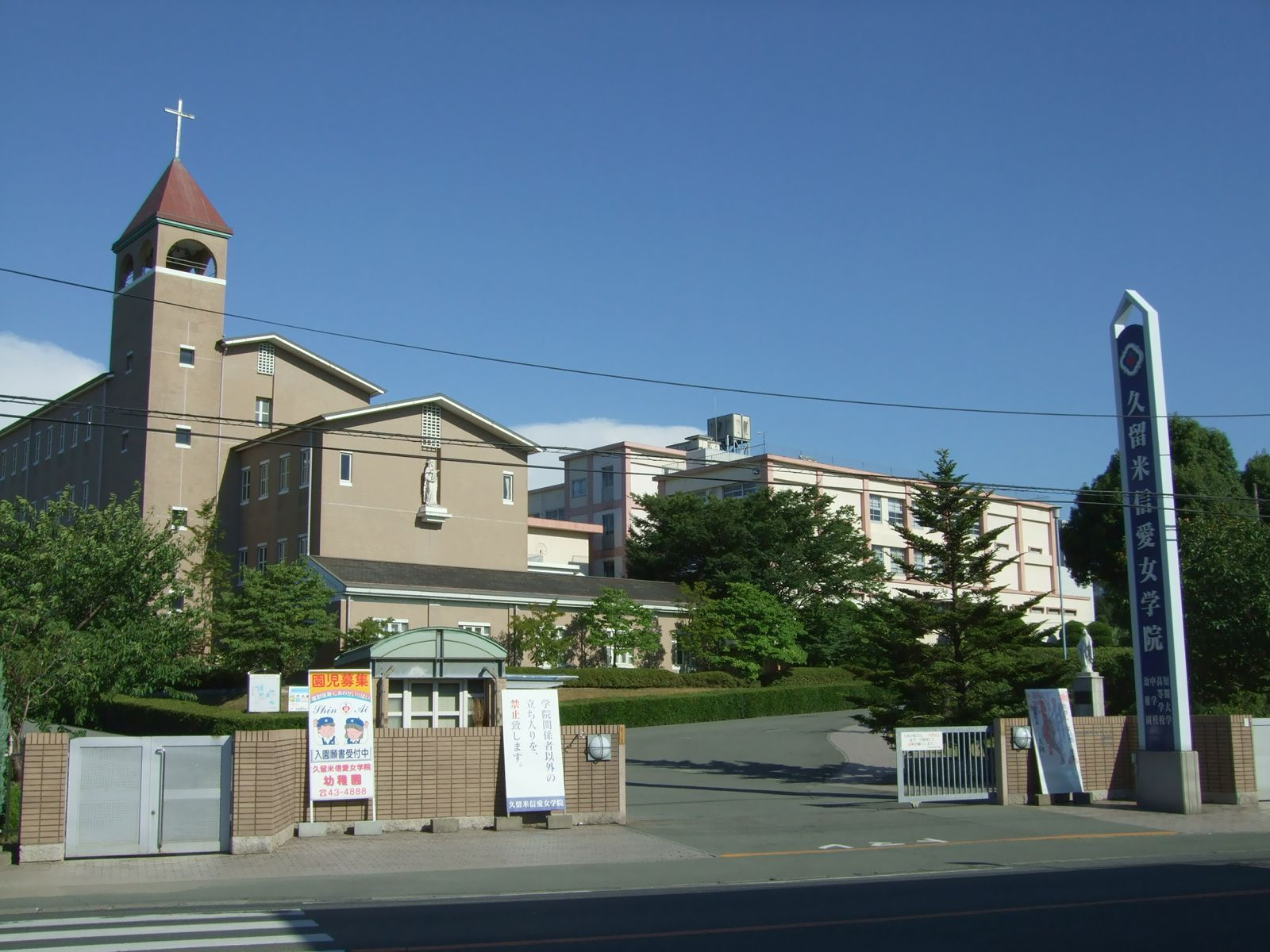
Kurume Shin-Ai Women's College

Kurume Shin-Ai Women's College (久留米信愛女学院短期大学, Kurume shin-ai jogakuin tanki daigaku) is a private women's junior college in Kurume, Fukuoka, Japan, established in 1968. In 2004 the college was selected for Good Practice, a fund program by the ministry of education.
