= Kurume =

Core City in Kyushu, Japan

Kurume 久留米市
- Core city
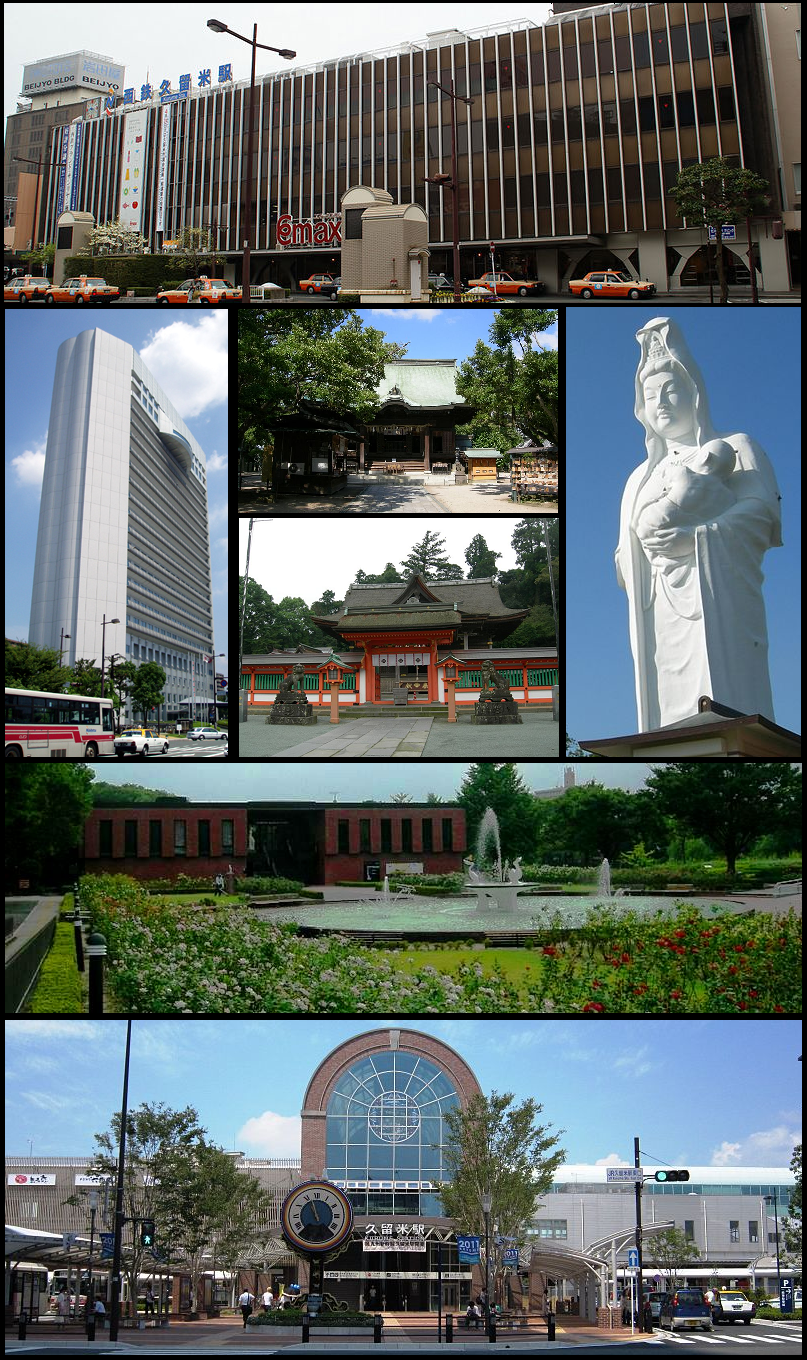
- From the upper left: Nishitetsu Kurume Station, city hall, Suitengu shrine, Kora-taisha shrine, Narita-san temple Ishibashi bunka center, JR Kurume Station

- Flag Emblem
- Interactive map of Kurume
- Location in Japan
- Coordinates: 33°19′09″N 130°30′30″E
- Country: Japan
- Region: Kyushu
- Prefecture: Fukuoka

Government
  - Mayor: Shingo Haraguchi

Area
  - Total: 229.96 km^{2} (88.79 sq mi)

Population (February 1, 2024)
  - Total: 295,367
  - Density: 1,284.4/km^{2} (3,326.7/sq mi)
- Time zone: UTC+09:00 (JST)
- City hall address: 15-3 Jonan, Kurume-shi, Fukuoka-ken 830-8520
- Climate: Cfa
- Website: Official website
- Symbols
- Flower: Azalea, Cosmos
- Tree: Cinnamomum camphora, Zelkova serrata, Rhus succedanea, Camellia, Round Leaf Holly

Kurume (久留米市, Kurume-shi) is a city in Fukuoka Prefecture, Japan. As of 1 February 2024, the city had an estimated population of 295,367 in 137,140 households, and a population density of 1309 people per km². The total area of the city is 229.96 km^{2} (88.79 sq mi).

== Geography ==
Kurume is located in the Chikugo Plain in southern Fukuoka Prefecture. The urban center is located approximately 40 kilometers from the prefectural capital at Fukuoka City, but due to the incorporation of surrounding municipalities in 2005, the city area has become approximately 32 kilometers east-west and approximately 16 kilometers north-south, making it a municipality with a long east-west direction. The Chikugo River flows from the northeast to the southwest of the city. The boundary is drawn almost along the river, and there are only a few parts of the city where the Chikugo River runs through the city. From the southern part of the city to the southeastern part is a mountain range called the Minou Mountain Range, which includes mountains such as Mt. Takatori, Mt. Hatsushin, and Mt. Mino.

=== Neighboring municipalities ===
Fukuoka Prefecture

- Asakura
- Chikugo
- Hirokawa
- Ogōri
- Ōkawa
- Ōki
- Tachiarai
- Ukiha
- Yame

Saga Prefecture

- Kanzaki
- Miyaki
- Tosu

=== Climate ===
Kurume has a humid subtropical climate (Köppen: Cfa). The average annual temperature in Kurume is 16.8 °C (62.2 °F). The average annual rainfall is 1,938.4 mm (76.31 in) with July as the wettest month. The temperatures are highest on average in August, at around 28.2 °C (82.8 °F), and lowest in January, at around 5.6 °C (42.1 °F). The highest temperature ever recorded in Kurume was 40.4 °C (104.7 °F) on 3 August 2026; the coldest temperature ever recorded was −6.5 °C (20.3 °F) on 25 January 2016.

Climate data for Kurume (1991−2020 normals, extremes 1977−present)
Month	Jan	Feb	Mar	Apr	May	Jun	Jul	Aug	Sep	Oct	Nov	Dec	Year
Record high °C (°F)	20.0 (68.0)	23.0 (73.4)	25.6 (78.1)	30.7 (87.3)	35.8 (96.4)	37.5 (99.5)	39.8 (103.6)	40.4 (104.7)	38.0 (100.4)	33.8 (92.8)	29.6 (85.3)	23.9 (75.0)	40.4 (104.7)
Mean daily maximum °C (°F)	10.1 (50.2)	11.8 (53.2)	15.4 (59.7)	21.0 (69.8)	25.9 (78.6)	28.2 (82.8)	31.8 (89.2)	33.1 (91.6)	29.3 (84.7)	24.2 (75.6)	18.1 (64.6)	12.3 (54.1)	21.8 (71.2)
Daily mean °C (°F)	5.6 (42.1)	6.9 (44.4)	10.2 (50.4)	15.2 (59.4)	20.0 (68.0)	23.5 (74.3)	27.3 (81.1)	28.2 (82.8)	24.5 (76.1)	19.1 (66.4)	13.2 (55.8)	7.7 (45.9)	16.8 (62.2)
Mean daily minimum °C (°F)	1.7 (35.1)	2.5 (36.5)	5.5 (41.9)	10.1 (50.2)	15.1 (59.2)	19.8 (67.6)	24.0 (75.2)	24.6 (76.3)	20.9 (69.6)	14.8 (58.6)	8.9 (48.0)	3.6 (38.5)	12.6 (54.7)
Record low °C (°F)	−6.5 (20.3)	−6.1 (21.0)	−4.9 (23.2)	−0.3 (31.5)	5.9 (42.6)	10.8 (51.4)	16.8 (62.2)	17.9 (64.2)	9.9 (49.8)	3.7 (38.7)	−0.8 (30.6)	−3.9 (25.0)	−6.5 (20.3)
Average precipitation mm (inches)	56.0 (2.20)	80.2 (3.16)	122.5 (4.82)	156.0 (6.14)	177.7 (7.00)	339.2 (13.35)	376.3 (14.81)	227.7 (8.96)	165.4 (6.51)	89.1 (3.51)	89.3 (3.52)	59.0 (2.32)	1,938.4 (76.31)
Average precipitation days (≥ 1.0 mm)	8.3	9.0	10.6	9.9	9.4	13.2	12.6	10.7	9.0	6.2	8.3	7.8	115
Mean monthly sunshine hours	125.6	138.6	170.0	186.6	191.9	125.3	173.6	204.6	178.4	185.2	147.9	131.3	1,963.9
Source: Japan Meteorological Agency

=== Demographics ===
Per Japanese census data, the population of Kurume in 2020 is 303,316 people. Kurume has been conducting censuses since 1960.

Historical population
Year	Pop.	±%
1960	248,997	—
1965	248,963	−0.0%
1970	255,203	+2.5%
1975	265,132	+3.9%
1980	280,291	+5.7%
1985	288,574	+3.0%
1990	294,665	+2.1%
1995	302,741	+2.7%
2000	304,884	+0.7%
2005	306,434	+0.5%
2010	302,323	−1.3%
2015	304,552	+0.7%
2020	303,316	−0.4%
Kurume population statistics

== History ==
The area of Kurume was part of ancient Chikugo Province, and the location of its ancient provincial capital and the site of its kokubun-ji and ichinomiya. During the Edo Period the area was under the control of Kurume Domain, ruled for most of its history by the Arima clan, who developed the jōkamachi around Kurume Castle into a commercial center due to the clan's policy to promote industries. Bairin-ji, the clan’s family temple was also founded in the relative vicinity of the castle. After the Meiji restoration, the city of Kurume was established on May 1, 1889, with the creation of the modern municipalities system.

During the First World War from 1915 to 1919, over 1,000 German and about 50 Austro-Hungarian soldiers (Prisoners of War) after surrendering at Tsingtao, were allocated to an internment camp in Kurume, which was the largest such camp in Japan.

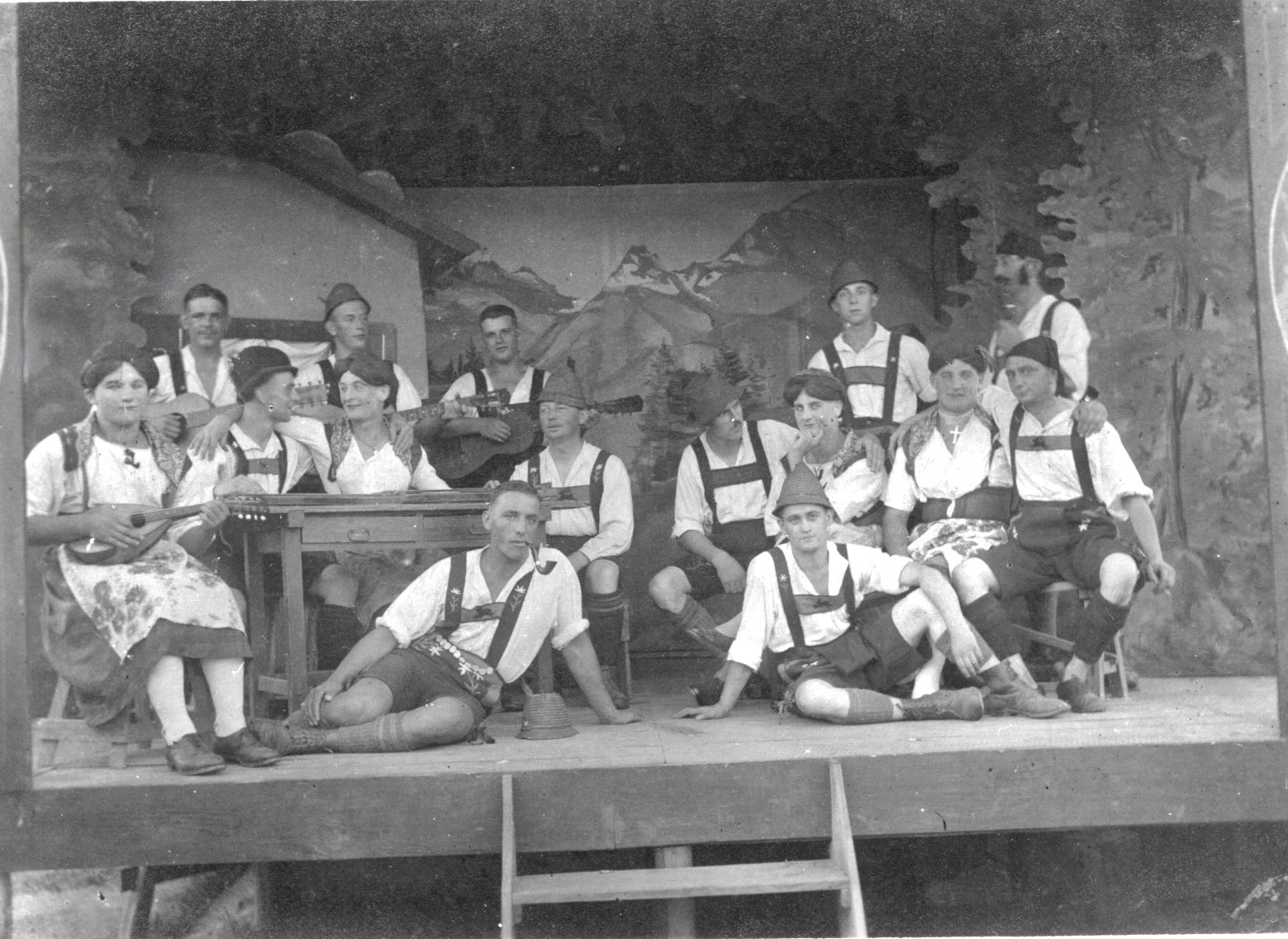
Theatre Activity in Camp Kurume

The cultural and other exchanges between the Western and Japanese soldiers, as well as local people made a long lasting impact on both the cultural and industrial development of the city. The prisoners’ work and skills contributed to the development of the local rubber industry which served as a basis for the now world-famous tyre manufacturer Bridgestone.

Kurume was a garrison town for the Imperial Japanese Army and from 1922, a center for the rubber and chemical industries. During World War II, on August 11, 1945, and just a few days after the atomic attacks on Hiroshima and Nagasaki, the Kurume air raid (consisting of 53 B-24 bombers operating from US airfields in Okinawa and using M76 incendiary bombs) left 212 people dead and much of the urban center destroyed.

The city area continued to expand throughout the post-war period by annexing surrounding villages and towns. On April 1, 2001, Kurume was designated as a special city and on April 1, 2008, it became a core city. On February 5, 2005, the town of Kitano (from Mii District), the towns of Jōjima and Mizuma (both from Mizuma District), and the town of Tanushimaru (from Ukiha District) were merged into Kurume.

== Government ==
Kurume has a mayor-council form of government with a directly elected mayor and a unicameral city council of 36 members. Kurume, together with the city of Ukiha contributes five members to the Fukuoka Prefectural Assembly. In terms of national politics, the city is part of the Fukuoka 6th district of the lower house of the Diet of Japan.

== Economy ==
Kurume is a regional commercial center. In terms of industry, the city is the birthplace of Bridgestone and is an important production base as the group's original plant remains located here. There are also many factories of various manufacturers of rubber processed products. In recent years, the light vehicle engine factory of Daihatsu Kyushu, a subsidiary of Daihatsu Motor Corporation, and the press parts manufacturing factory of Topre Kyushu, a subsidiary of Topre, have expanded into the area, playing a role in the consolidation of the automobile industry in northern Kyushu.

=== Traditional products ===
Traditional products of Kurume are kasuri (絣), or woven indigo-dyed cloth; tonkotsu ramen (pork-bone broth noodles); and trays and bowls made from rantai shikki (籃胎漆器), a composite made from lacquered bamboo.

== Education ==
=== Universities ===
- Kurume Institute of Technology
- Kurume Shin-Ai Women's College
- Kurume University
  - Kurume University Hospital
- St.Mary's College

=== Primary and secondary education ===
Kurume has 45 public elementary schools and 17 public junior high schools and two high school operated by the city government and six public high schools operated by the Fukuoka Prefectural Board of Education. There is also one private combined elementary/junior high school and four private high schools. The city operates one and the prefecture operates two schools for the handicapped.

== Transportation ==
=== Railways ===
JR Kyushu - Kyushu Shinkansen

Kurume

JR Kyushu - Kagoshima Main Line

JA Kurume - Araki

JR Kyushu - Kyūdai Main Line

Kyūdai Main Line
- Kurume - Kurume-Kōkōmae - Minami-Kurume - Kurume-Daigakumae - Mii - Zendōji - Chikugo-Kusano - Tanushimaru

Nishitetsu Tenjin Ōmuta Line

- Miyanojin - Kushiwara - Nishitetsu Kurume - Hanabatake - Shikenjōmae - Tsubuku - Yasutake - Daizenji - Mizuma - Inuzuka

Nishitetsu Amagi Line

- Miyanojin - Gorōmaru - Gakkōmae - Koganchaya - Kitano - Ōki - Kaneshima

=== Highways ===
- Kyushu Expressway
- National Route 3
- National Route 209
- National Route 210
- National Route 264
- National Route 322
- National Route 385

=== Air transport ===
The city does not have its own airport. The nearest airports are:

- Saga Airport provides direct routes to Tokyo and some international destinations to China, Taiwan, and South Korea. It is located 33 km (21 mi) south west.
- Fukuoka Airport provides most domestic and international flights. It is located 42 km (26 mi) north west.

== Sister cities ==
Kurume is twinned with the following cities.

- Kōriyama, Fukushima, Japan
- Modesto, California, United States
- Hefei, Anhui, China

== Local attractions ==
- Bairin-ji, a main Zen Buddhist temple in Kyushu
- Kōra taisha, ichinomiya of Chikugo Province
- Kurume Castle
- Kurume Suitengū
- Naritasan Kurume Bunin
- Zendō-ji, the head temple of the Jōdo Buddhist sect in Kyushu.

=== National Historic Sites ===
- Ankokuji Burial Jar Cluster
- Chikugo Kokufu ruins
- Kōra-san Kōgoishi
- Kurume Domain Arima Clan Cemetery
- Nichirinji Kofun
- Ontsuka - Gongenzuka Kofun
- Shimobaba Kofun
- Takayama Hikokurō Grave
- Tanushimaru Kofun Cluster
- Urayama Kofun

== Notable people born or raised in Kurume ==
In chronological order of birth year:

- Tanaka Hisashige (1799-1881) Engineer and Inventor who started the company which became Toshiba.
- George Shima (1864–1926), "Potato King" of California.
- Hiroshi Yoshida (1876–1950), Japanese traditional painter and woodblock printmaker.
- Sakamoto Hanjiro (1882–1969), Western-style artist.
- Shigeru Aoki (1882–1911), Western-style artist.
- Shōjirō Ishibashi (1889–1976), founder of Bridgestone Corporation, which originated in Kurume as traditional footwear manufacturers, producing the sock-like shoe (jika-tabi) used by farmers; they found that by coating the bottom of tabi with rubber, farmers could be protected from the invasion of parasitic worms that live in rice paddies.
- Takashima Yajuro (1890–1975), Western-style painter who established his own style of realism.
- Harue Koga (1895–1933), eclectic avant-garde artist and poet.
- Susumu Fujita (1912–1990/91), actor.
- Leiji Matsumoto (1938–2023), manga artist, anime character designer and animator.
- Seiji Sakaguchi (1942–present), Japanese professional wrestler and judoka
- Ryo Ishibashi (1956–present), actor.
- Seiko Matsuda (1962–present), singer and actress.
- Fumiya Fujii (1962–present), lead vocalist of The Checkers (Japanese band).
- Izumi Sakai (1967–2007), lead vocalist of Zard; born in Kurume, but raised in Kanagawa.
- Rena Tanaka (1980–present), actress.
- Kanikapila 7 piece Pop Band.
- Leo Ieiri (1994–present), singer, songwriter.
- Haruka Noma (2002-present), known as Hal-Ca, guitarist and vocalist of heavy metal/hard rock band Asterism (band)
