= Arima Yoriyuki =

Japanese mathematician

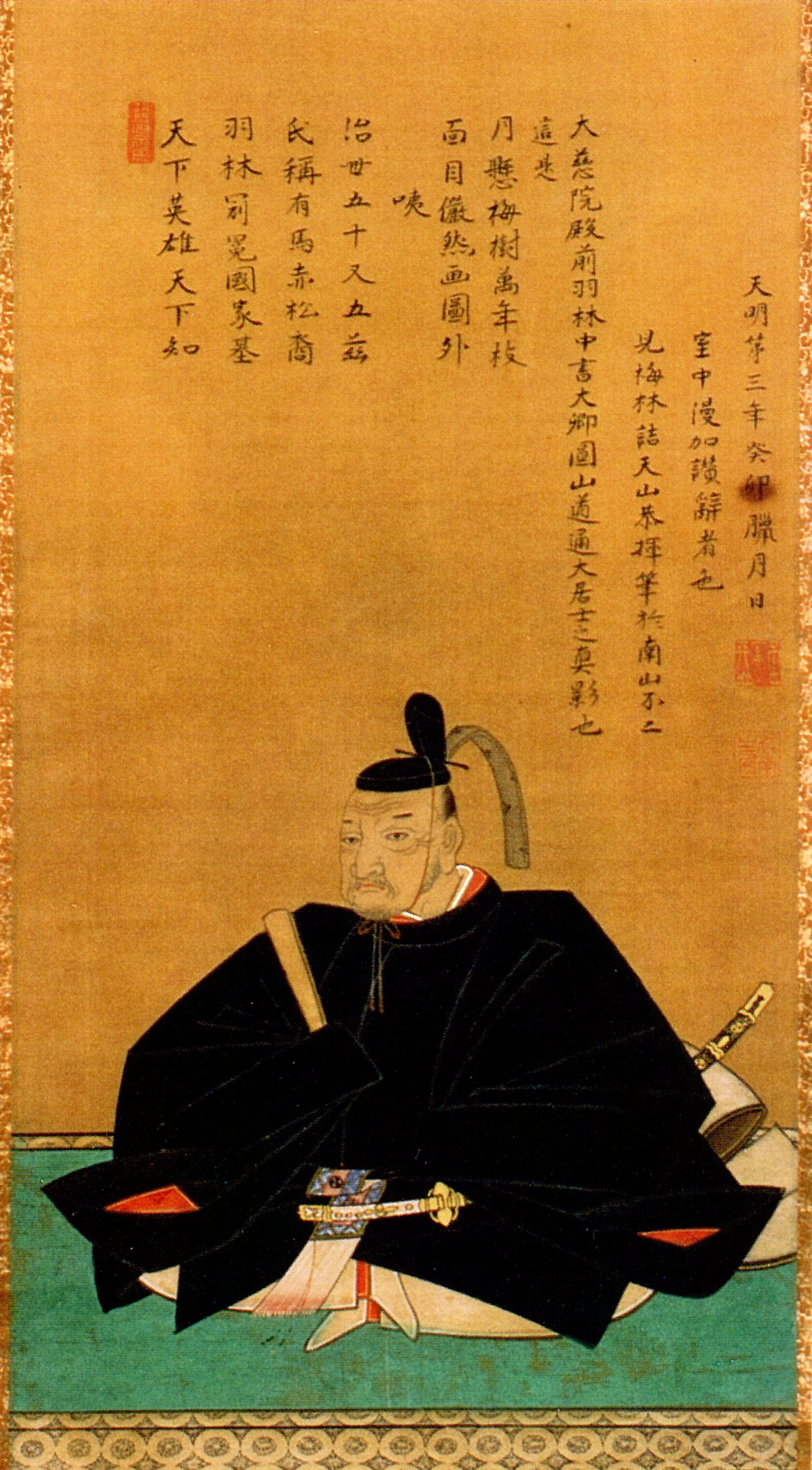
Arima Yoriyuki

Arima Yoriyuki (有馬 頼徸; December 31, 1714 – December 16, 1783) was a Japanese mathematician of the Edo period. He was the lord of Kurume Domain.

He approximated the value of $\pi$ and its square, $\pi^2$. In 1766, he found the following rational approximation of $\pi$, correct to 29 digits:

$$\pi\approx\frac{428224593349304}{136308121570117}=3.14159265358979323846264338327(569...).$$
