= Kōra taisha =

Shinto shrine in Fukuoka Prefecture

Kōra taisha (高良大社)
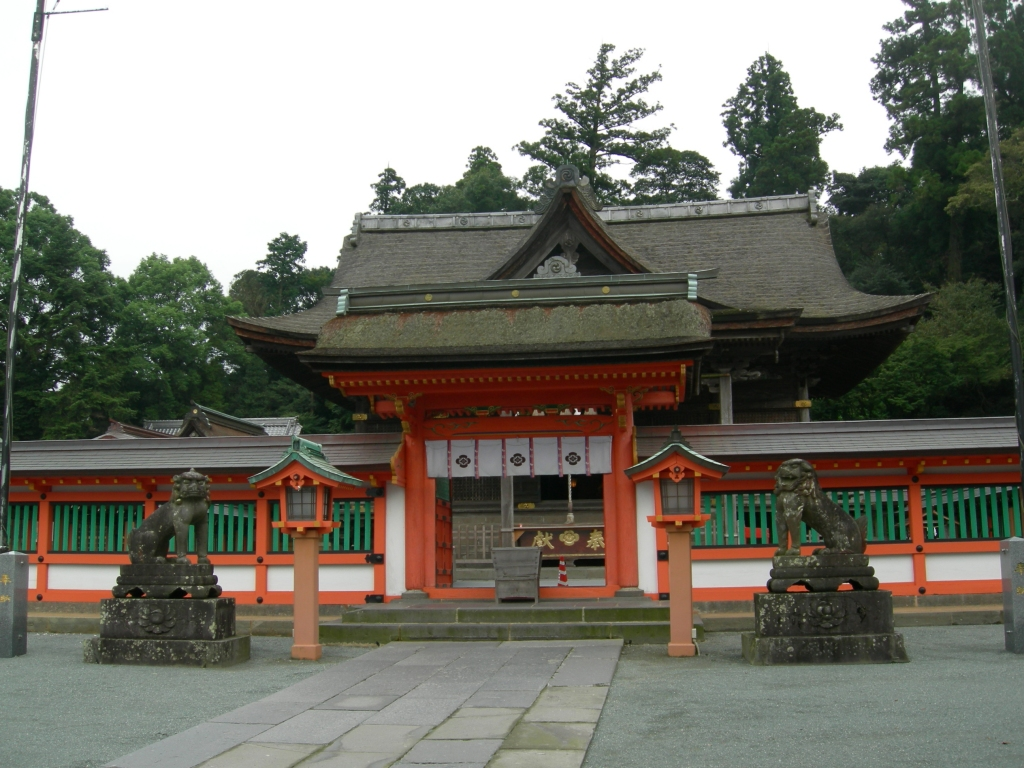
- Kōra Taisha

- Kōra taisha Kōra taisha (Japan)

Religion
- Affiliation: Shinto
- Deity: Kōra Tamatare no mikoto
- Festival: 9 October

Location
- Location: 1 Mii-machi, Kurume-shi, Fukuoka-ken
- Interactive map of Kōra taisha (高良大社)
- Coordinates: 33°18′5.83″N 130°33′57.28″E

Architecture
- Founder: c. Emperor Richū
- Established: pre-Nara period

Website
- Official website

Kōra Taisha (高良大社, Kōra-taisha) is a Shinto shrine located on Mount Kōra of the city of Kurume, Fukuoka Prefecture, Japan. It is the ichinomiya of former Chikugo Province as well as its sōja shrine. The shrine's main festival is held annually on 9 October. It was also known as the Kōra Tamatare no mikoto Jinja (高良玉垂命神社) or the Kōra Tamatare no miya (高良玉垂宮)

== Enshrined kami ==
The kami enshrined at Kōra Taisha are:

- Kōra Tamatare no mikoto (高良玉垂命)
- Hachiman (八幡大神)
- Sumiyoshi (住吉大神)

In addition, there is a guest room inside the main shrine, where Toyohime Ōkami (豊比咩大神) is enshrined. She is said to be the wife of Kōra Tamatare no mikoto. There are also many sub-shrines scattered around the main shrine's grounds.

== History ==
The foundation of Kōra Taisha is unknown. Per the shrine's legend, it was founded either during the reign of Kofun period Emperor Nintoku or his son, Emperor Richū (during the late 4th or early 5th century). It first appears in historical documentation in the Nihon Kiryaku dated 795, in entries in the Shoku Nihon Kōki dated 840, 841, and 848 and in the Nihon Montoku Tennō Jitsuroku in entries dated 851 and 858. Per the Nihon Sandai Jitsuroku, the enshrined kami Takara Tamatare-no-miko was awarded first court rank by the Imperial court in 870. In the early Heian period Engishiki it is given the rank of Myojin Taisha and is listed as the ichinomiya of Chikugo Province.

Furthermore, according to legend, the mountain was originally sacred to Takamimusubi and was named Takamure-yama. This name remains reflected in several place names around Kurume. The connection between Takamimusubi and Kōra Tamatare has been the subject of much controversy over the centuries. He has been identified as an ancestor of the Mononobe clan, Nakatomi clan, Watatsumi, Emperor Keiko, and incarnation of Sumiyoshi or even a deity from Baekje, Shilla or Goryeo, among others. In the Edo Period, the prevailing theory identified him with Takenouchi no Sukune, but since the Meiji period no particular theory is promoted.

The current shrine buildings were donated by Arima Yoritoshi, the third daimyō of Kurume Domain, and the main shrine was completed in 1660. Following the Meiji restoration, with the establishment of State Shinto in 1871, the shrine was originally designed as a National Shrine, 2nd Rank (国幣中社, kokuhei-chusha), but was promoted to a National Shrine, 1st Rank (国幣大社, kokuhei-taisha) in 1915.

The shrine is located a 50 minute walk from Kurume-Daigakumae Station on the JR Kyushu Kyūdai Main Line.

== Cultural Properties ==
=== Important Cultural Properties ===
Kōra Taisha Honden, Heiden, Haiden (高良大社 本殿・幣殿・拝殿), Edo Period (1661), designated 1972.

Ōtorii (高良大社 大鳥居), Edo Period (1654), designated 1972.

Heike Monogatari (紙本墨書平家物語; Shihon bokusho Heike Monogatari), Paper and ink, Muromachi Period (1654), dedicated to the shrine by the monk Jakushun in 1794, designated 1911.

=== Natural Monuments ===
Phyllostachys edulis forest in Mt. Kōra (高良山のモウソウキンメイチク林; Kōra-san no Mosokinmei Chikurin), bamboo forest, designated in 1974

=== Fukuoka Prefecture designated tangible cultural properties ===
Kōra-san Mitarai Bridge (高良山御手洗橋)
Kōra-taisha Engi (絹本著色高良大社縁起)
Kōra-taisha Documents (高良大社所蔵文書)

=== Fukuoka Prefecture designated natural monument ===
Kōra-taisha Camphora officinarum

== Gallery ==
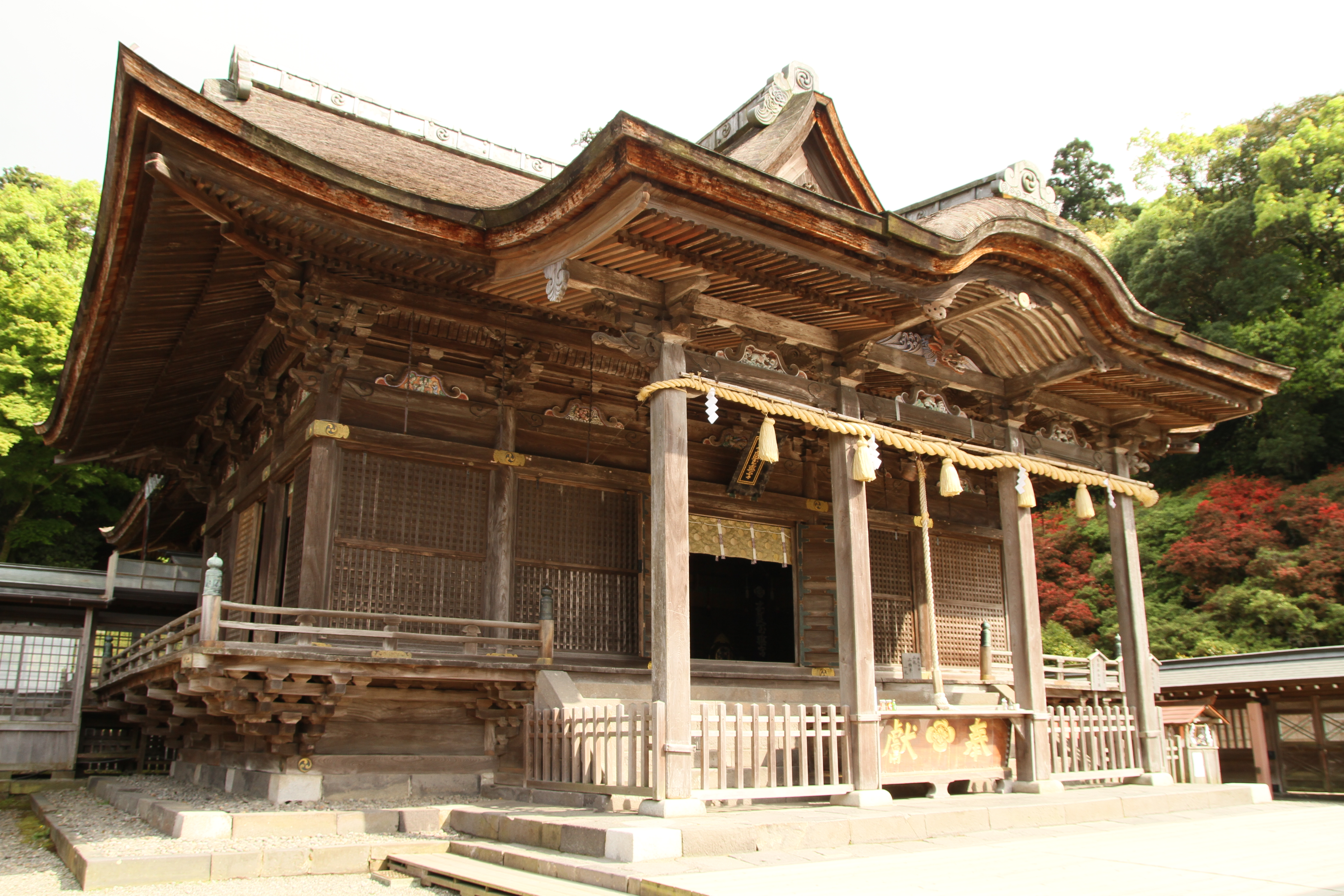
Haiden

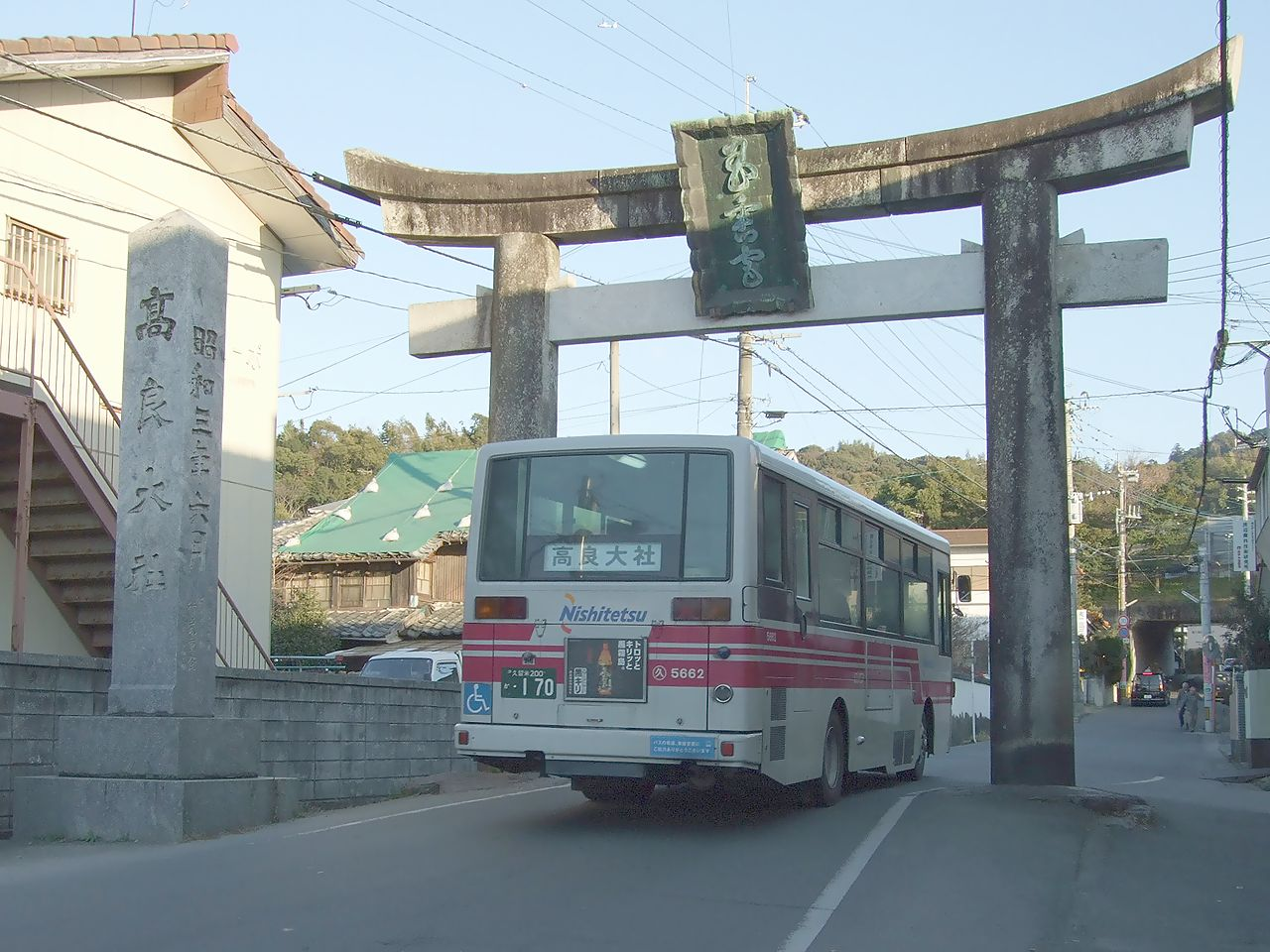
Otorii (NICP)

== See also ==
- List of Shinto shrines in Japan
- Ichinomiya
