= St. Mary's College (Japan) =

Private university in Kurume, Fukuoka, Japan

Coordinates: 33°18′21″N 130°30′30″E

St. Mary's College (聖マリア学院, Sei maria gakuin) is a private university in Kurume, Fukuoka, Japan, established in 2006. It is a member of Japan Association of Catholic Universities.
