= Kurume Institute of Technology =

Coordinates: 33°15′56″N 130°32′15″E

- Kurume kōgyō daigaku
- Type: Private
- Established: 1976
- Location: Kurume, Fukuoka, Japan
- Website: www.kurume-it.ac.jp/english/

Kurume Institute of Technology (久留米工業大学, Kurume kōgyō daigaku) is a private university in Kurume, Fukuoka, Japan, established in 1976.

KIT offers undergraduate degree programs in mechanical engineering, electrical engineering, information engineering, architecture, and civil engineering. The college also offers a doctoral program in engineering.

KIT offers undergraduate programs in five departments: Mechanical Engineering, Electrical and Electronic Engineering, Information Engineering, Materials Science and Engineering, and Architecture. It also offers graduate programs in these areas, as well as in Applied Mathematics and Physics.
