= Zoyama Kōgoishi =

Castle ruins in Miyama, Fukuoka, Japan

Zoyama kōgoshi
- 女山神籠石
- Miyama, Fukuoka, Fukuoka Prefecture, Japan
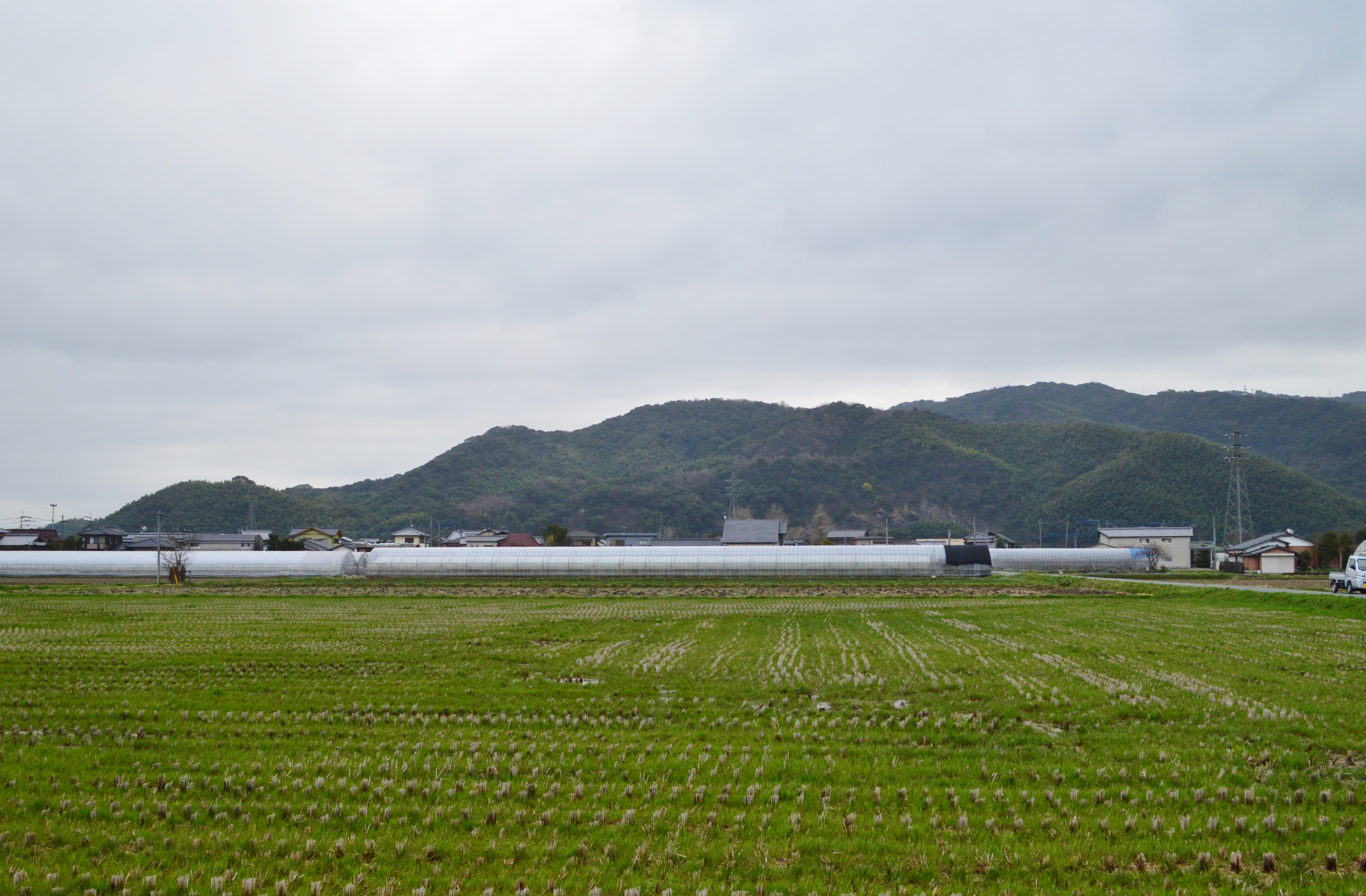
- Zoyama kōgoshi

Site information
- Type: Korean-style fortress
- Condition: Ruins

Location
- Coordinates: 33°9′47.90″N 130°31′8.32″E

Site history
- Built by: Yamato court
- In use: Asuka period
- Zoyama Kōgoishi (Fukuoka Prefecture) Zoyama Kōgoishi (Japan) National Historic Site of Japan

Zoyama kōgoshi (女山神籠石, Zoyama-kōgoshi) was an ancient castle (also known as a Korean-style fortress (朝鮮式山城, Chōsen-shiki yamajiro) located in the Ōkusa, Setaka-chō neighborhood of the city of Kōge, Chikujō District, Fukuoka Prefecture Japan. Its ruins have been protected as a National Historic Site since 1953, with the area under protection expanded in 1977.

== History ==
After the defeat of the combined Baekje and Yamato Japan forces, at the hands of the Silla and Tang China alliance at the Battle of Hakusukinoe in 663, the Yamato court feared an invasion from either or both Tang or Silla. In response, a huge network of shore fortifications was constructed throughout the rest of the 600s, often with the assistance of Baekje engineers, generals and artisans. Unaware of the outbreak of the Silla-Tang War (670–676), the Japanese would continue to build fortifications until 701, even after finding out that Silla was no longer friendly with Tang.

The Zoyama ruins are located on Mount Kosouzu, at an elevation of 200 meters above sea level, overlooking the middle reaches of the Yabe River that flows west of the Chikugo Plain. The fortification is not mentioned in any known literature or historical documentation, so its actual name, and date of construction are unknown. The fortification encloses the Yamauchi Kofun Cluster, a group of Kofun period burial mounds which date from before the construction of the castle. According to the archaeological excavations, it is estimated that the fortifications were built around the latter half of the 7th century.

The local legend was that "Zoyama" was so named as it was the residence of Yayoi period Queen Himiko of Yamatai in the third century. The northern part of the mountain has strange-shaped rocks that were part of the Shugendō mountain cult, and ritual artifacts, including bronze swords and bronze vessels believed to be of Chinese origin have been excavated. In addition, there are over a hundred known kofun burial mounds in four clusters, indicating that the entire mountain was regarded as a sacred mountain since ancient times. The low walls with simple stonework and incomplete encirclement of the mountain, lack of any evidence of building structures, as well as its lack of mention in the Nihon Shoki or other contemporary documents were all cited as supporting evidence of the now largely discredited kōgoishi theory that the site is a sacred site rather than a fortification.

The rows of stones were used for the foundation of earthworks are cube-shaped with each side approximately 70 centimeters. There are also stones with an L-shaped cutout on the top edge. These stones are placed on top of a layer of red clay, with the front and top surfaces aligned in a straight line, and the overall structure arranged in a curved line. The earthworks above the stone rows were made of two meters of rammed earth, and two types of alternating soil layers are recognized. There are also post holes spaced three meters apart in front of the stone rows, indicating the existence of a wooden palisade. The total length of the fortifications (which incorporates sections of natural stone outcrops) is approximately three kilometers, and encloses four valleys, each of which has water gates; however, no earthwork line or line of stone lines have yet been confirmed on the north and east sides. The sluice gate of Kagyu Mochidani is seven meters wide and 2.5 meters high, and is made of cut stones built into four to five tiers. It is estimated that it was constructed around the 645 to 665, and retains its ancient appearance.

Currently, only a small length of the walls remains on the southern ridgeline of Mount Zoyama and a portion to the west. Many stones were used in the Edo Period for the construction of the walls of Yanagawa Castle. In the early twentieth century, when the inner moat of the castle was filled in, stones take from this site were used to build embankments on reclaimed land. Stones are also found in revetments for irrigation canals near Zoyama, and as the foundation stones of private houses and tameples. As late as 1962, some of the stone rows were illegally removed to make way for housing and roads.

The area is now part of the Zoyama Historical Forest Park, and has an observation deck and other facilities overlooking the Chikugo Plain and the Ariake Sea. It is approximately 15 minutes by car from Setaka Station on the JR Kyushu Kagoshima Main Line.

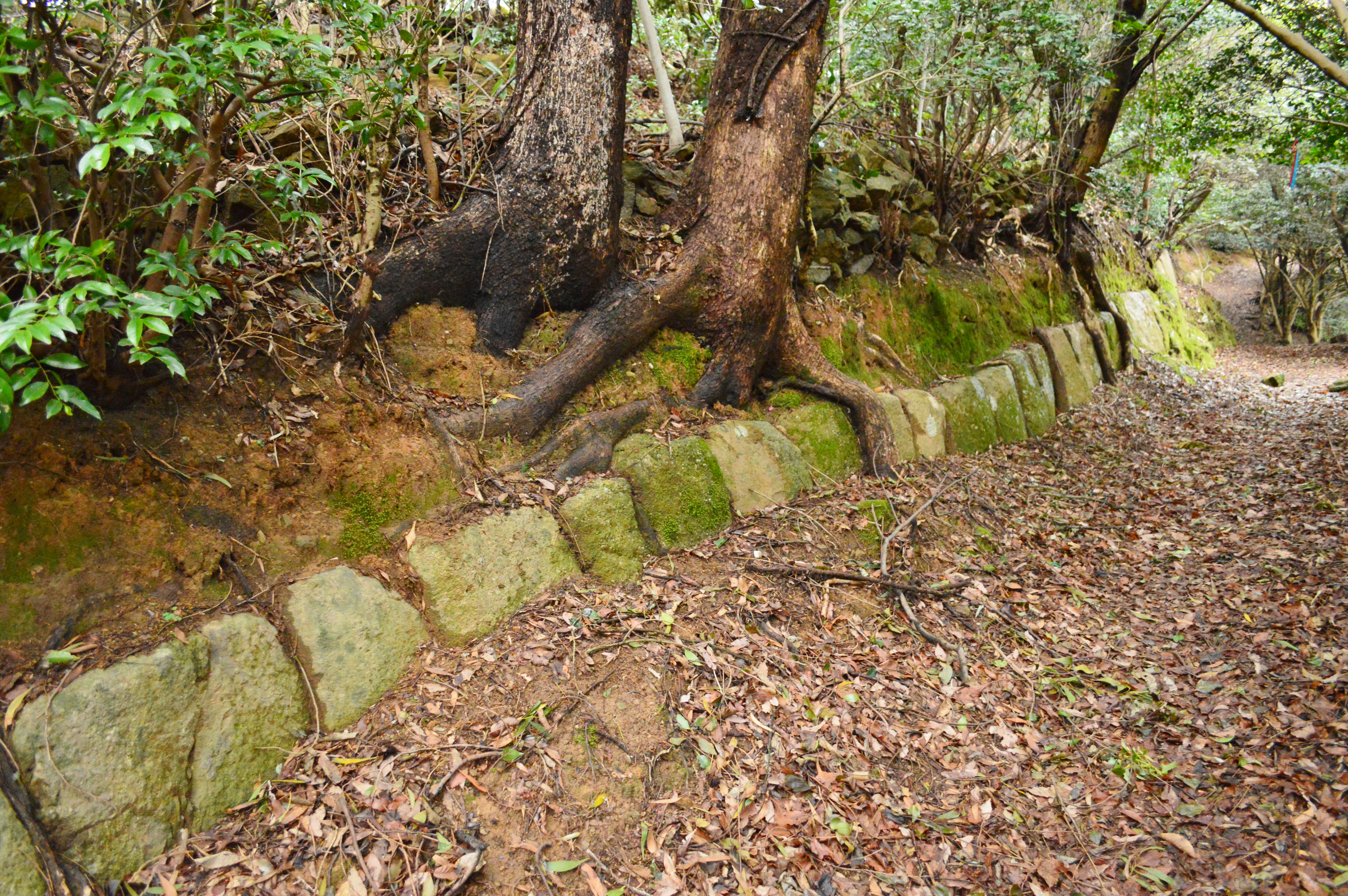
ruins of walls

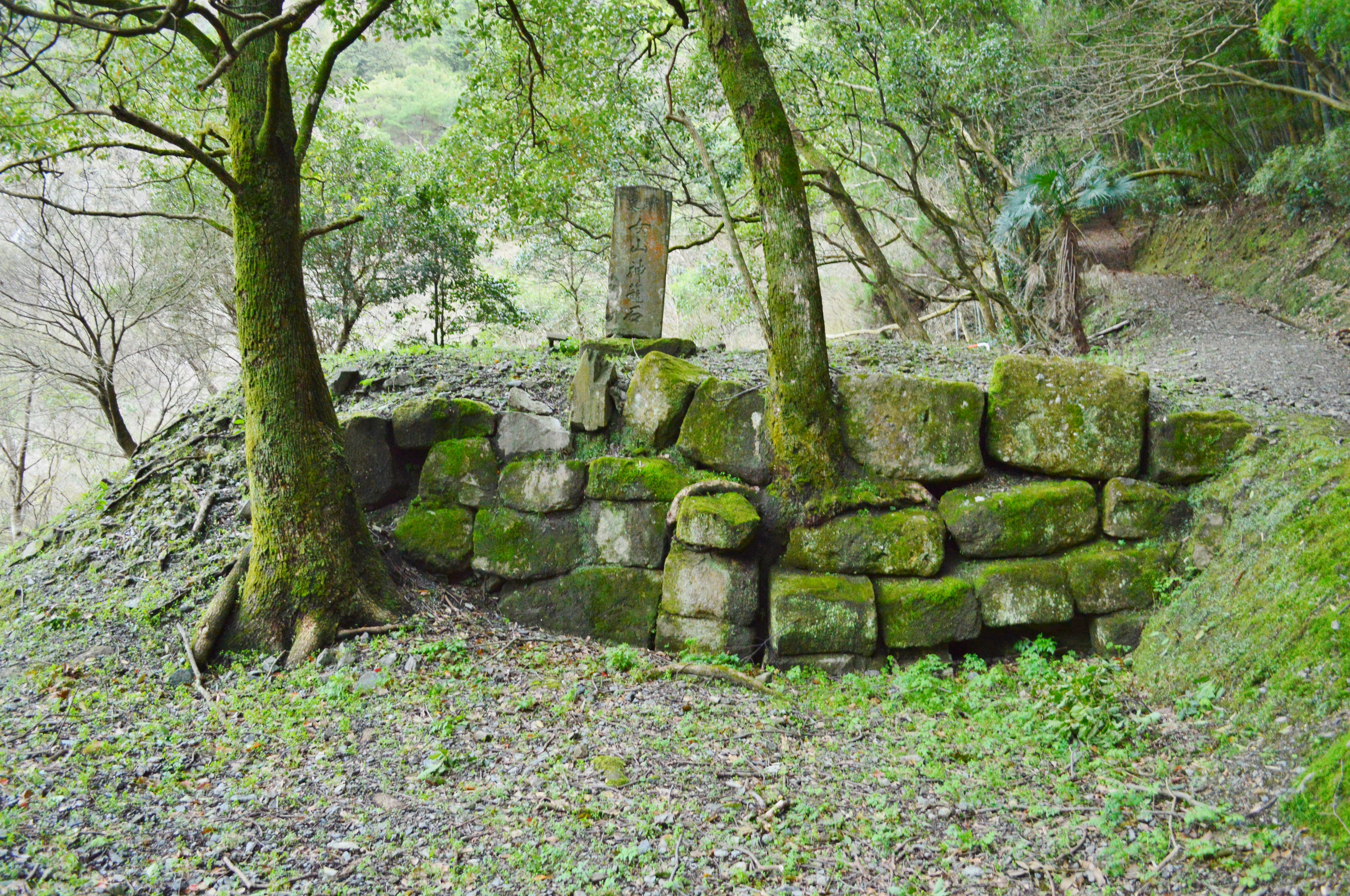
Umedani Water Gate

== See also ==
- List of Historic Sites of Japan (Fukuoka)
- List of foreign-style castles in Japan
- Kōgoishi

== Literature ==
- De Lange, William (2021). An Encyclopedia of Japanese Castles. Groningen: Toyo Press. pp. 600 pages. ISBN 978-9492722300.
- Motoo, Hinago (1986). Japanese Castles. Tokyo: Kodansha. pp. 200 pages. ISBN 0-87011-766-1.
