= Kurume Castle =

Castle ruins in Kurume, Japan

- 久留米城
- Kumano, Mie, Japan
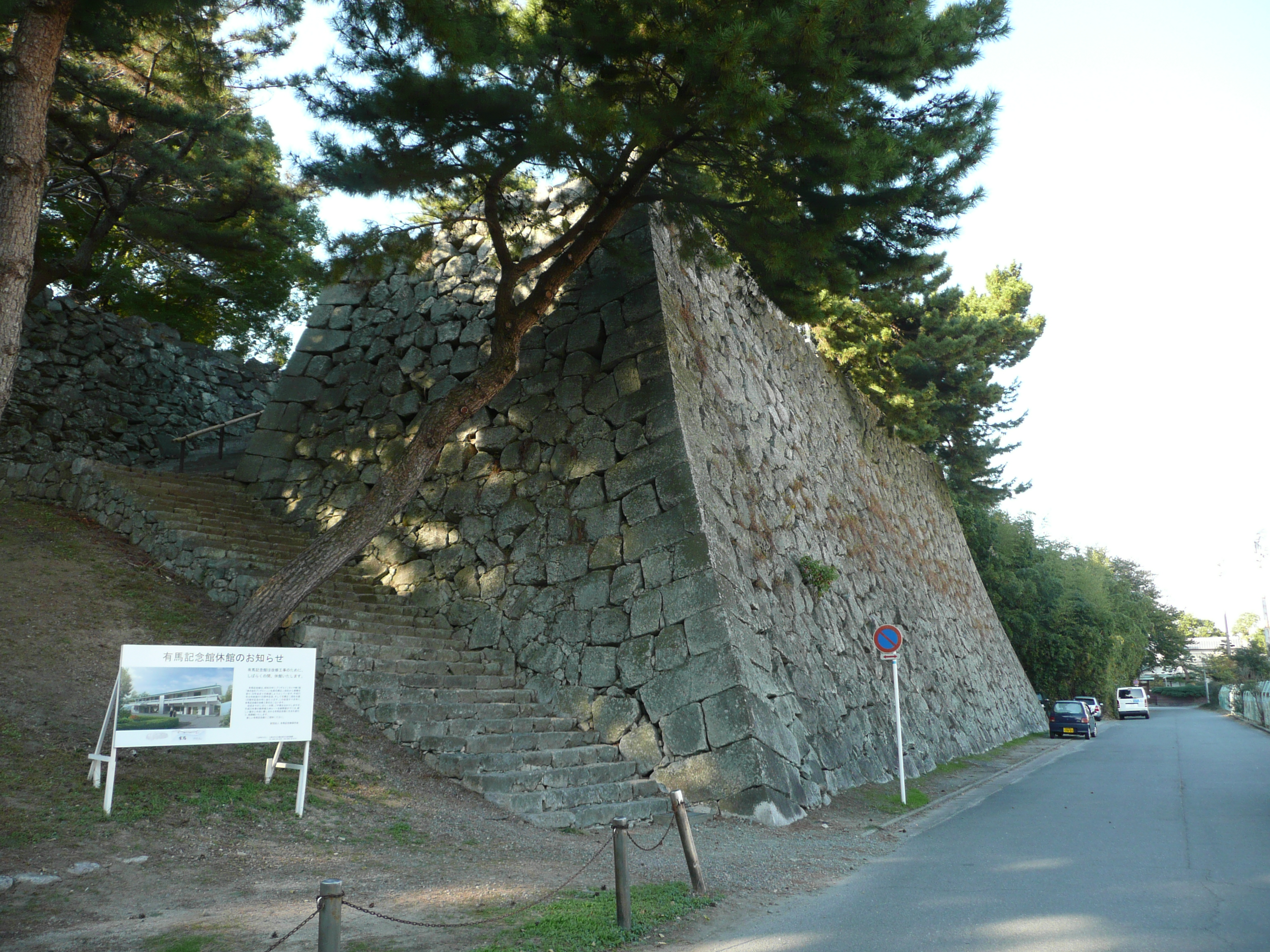
- Stone wall of Kurume Castle

Site information
- Type: Hirajirostyle castle
- Condition: ruins

Site history
- Built: 1504-21 / 1587
- Built by: Kobayakawa Hidekane
- Materials: Stone walls
- Demolished: 1871

Garrison information
- Past commanders: Kobayakawa Hidekane

Kurume Castle (久留米城, Kurume-jō) was a castle structure in Kurume, Japan. Kurume Castle was built by the ninth son of Mōri Motonari, Kobayakawa Hidekane in 1587.

Kurume castle is now only ruins, with some stone walls and water moat. The castle was listed as one of the Continued Top 100 Japanese Castles in 2017.

== Gallery ==
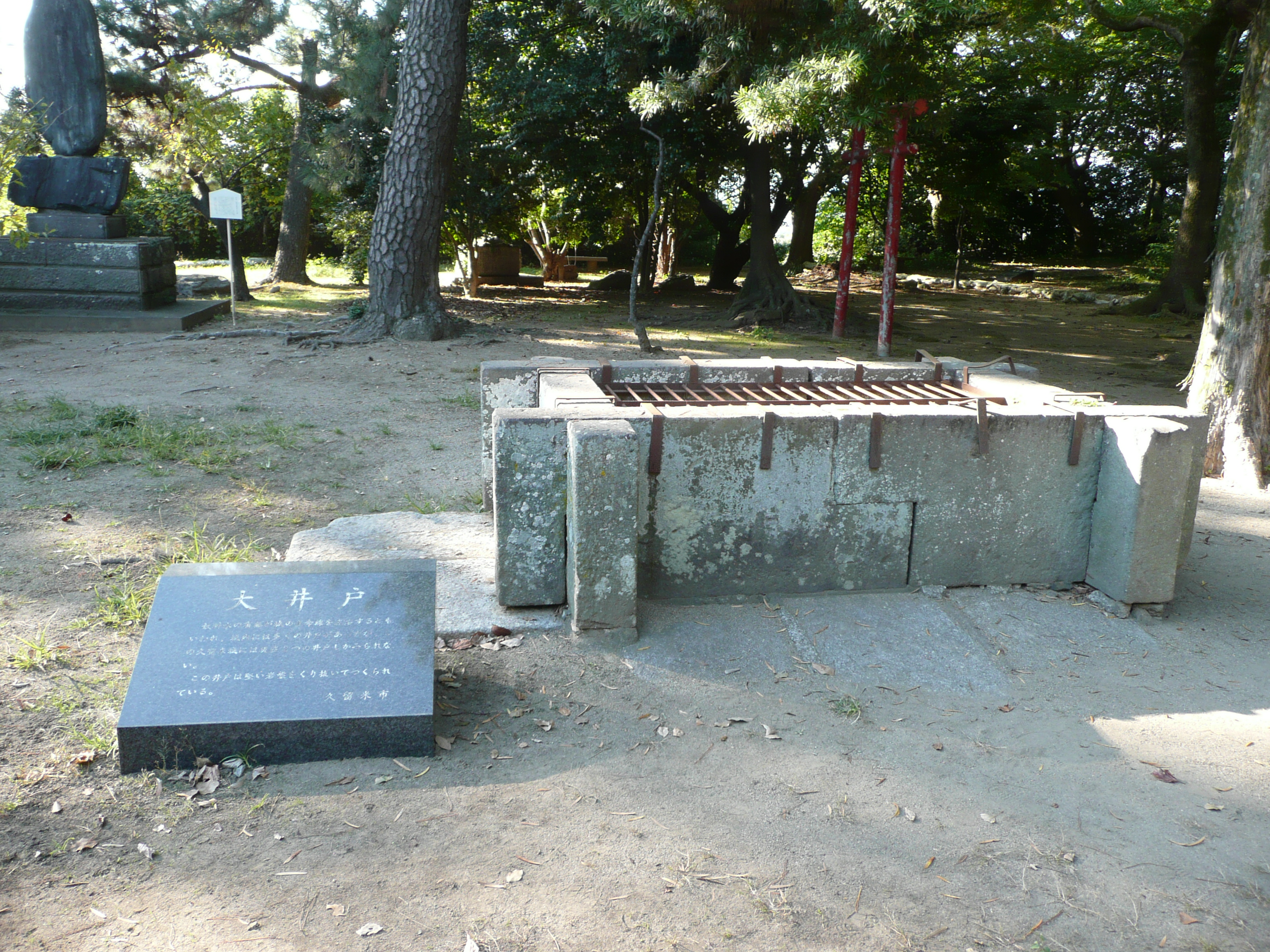
Well of Kurume Castle

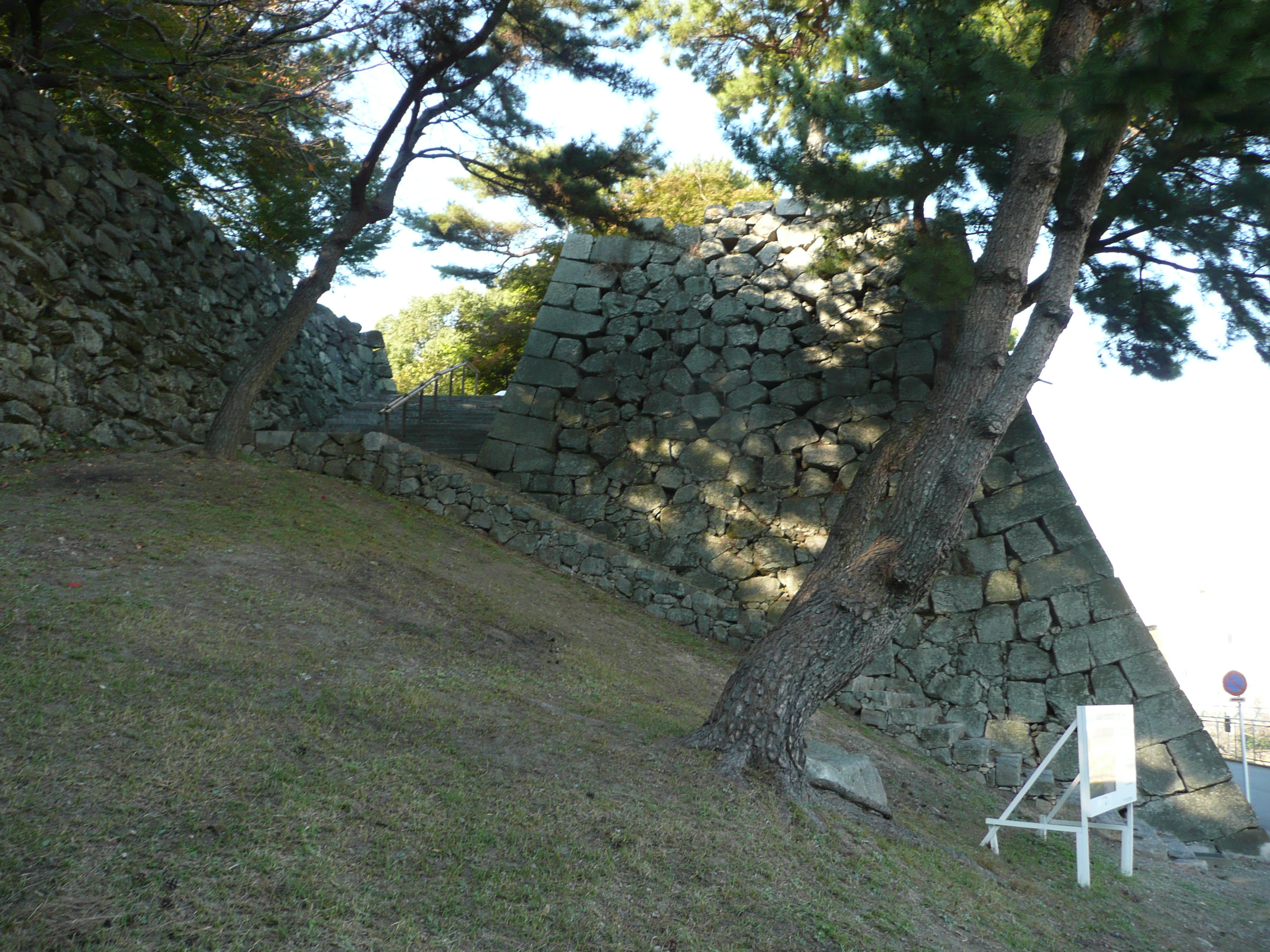
Stone wall of Higashigomon

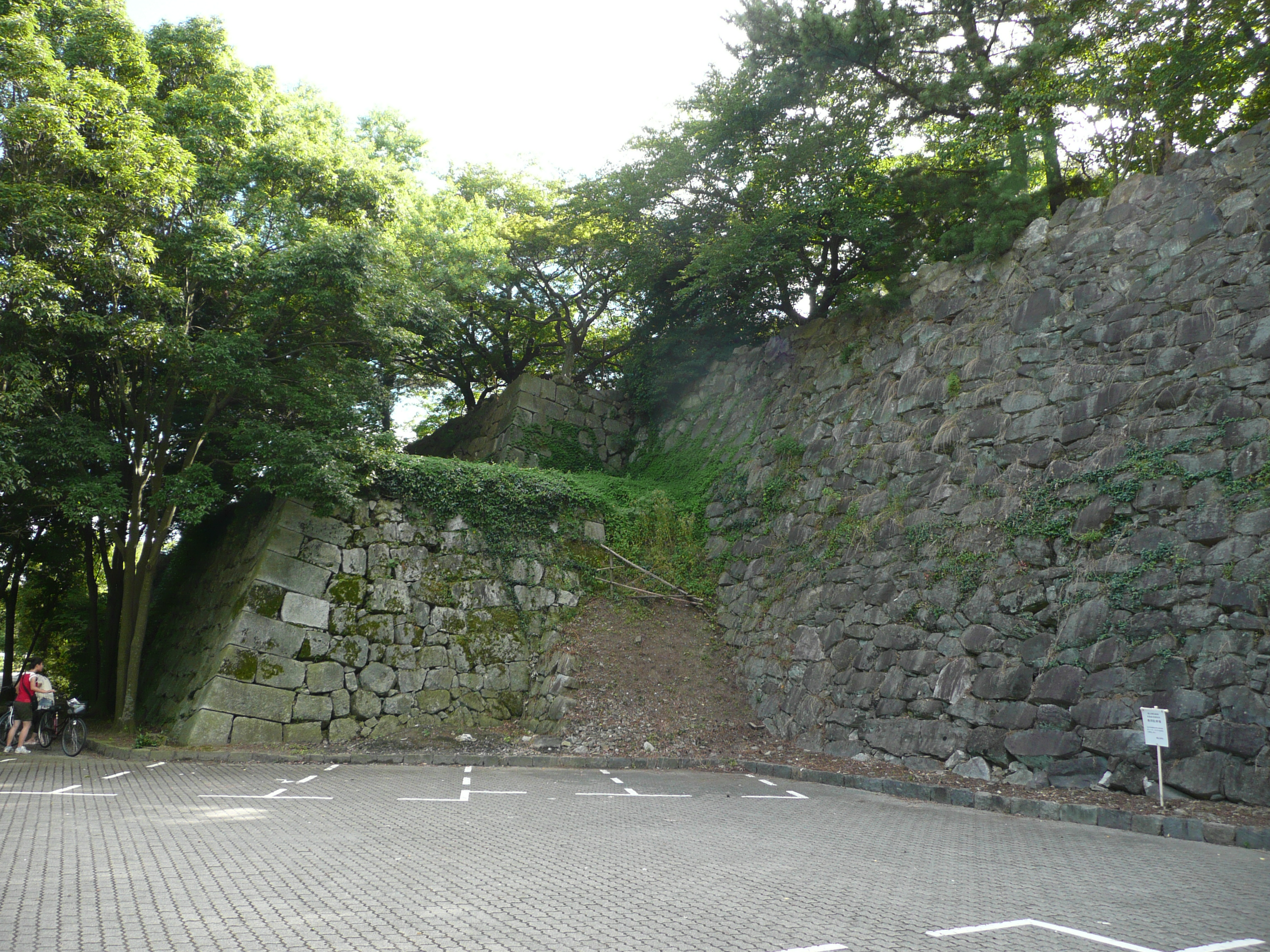
Stone wall of Tatsumiyagura

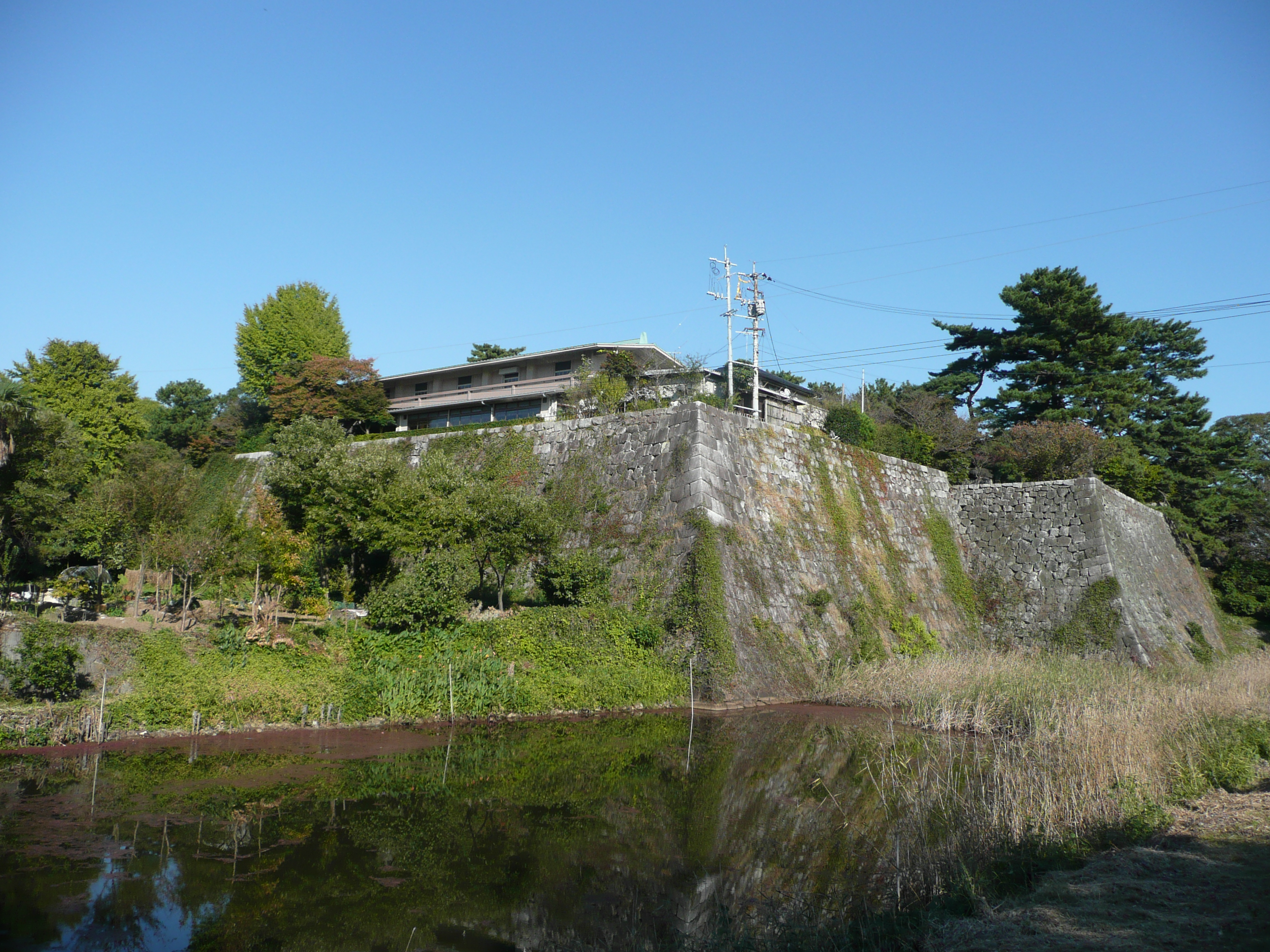
Stone wall of TaikoYagura

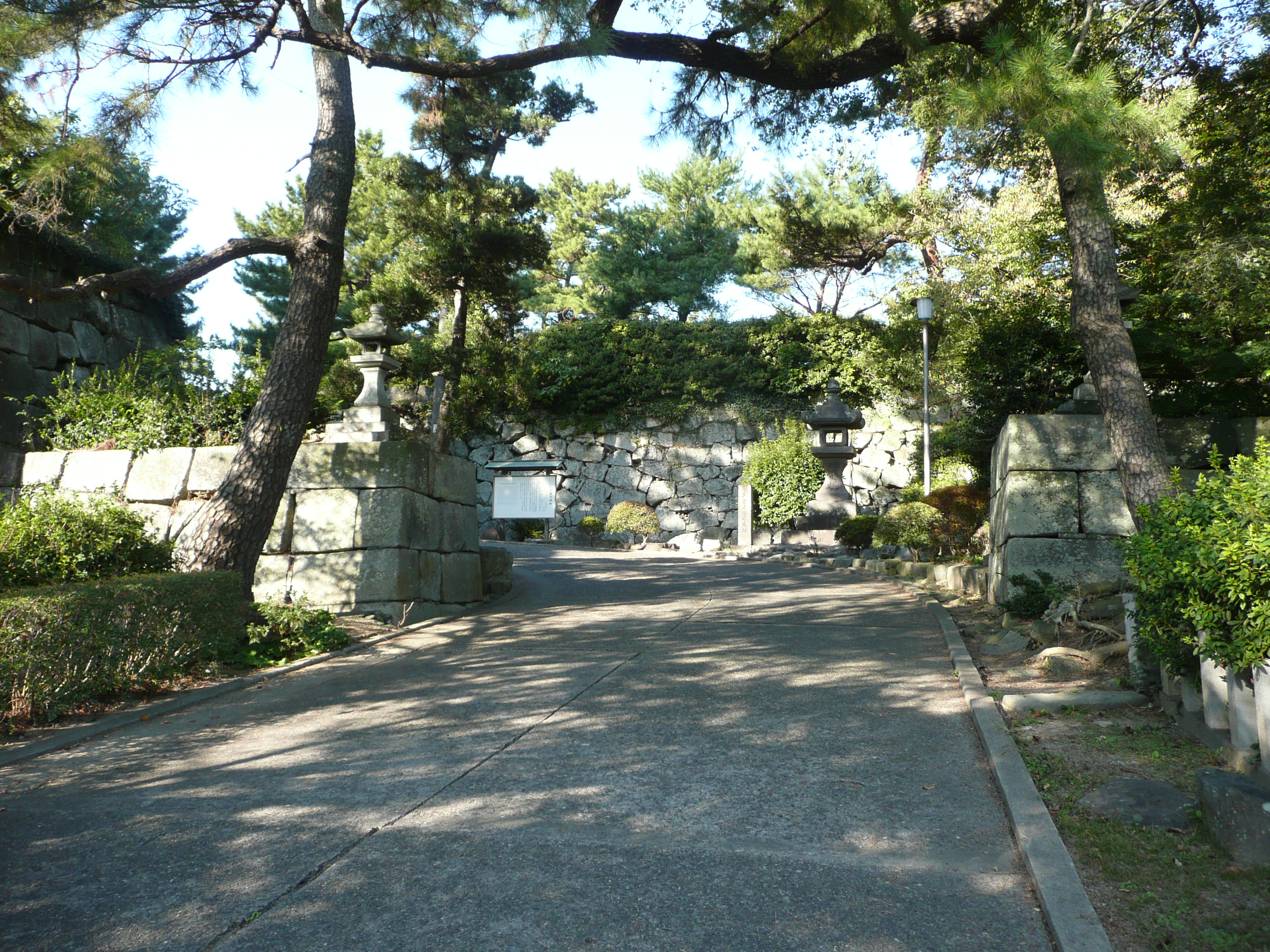
Kabokigomon gate

== Literature ==
- De Lange, William (2021). An Encyclopedia of Japanese Castles. Groningen: Toyo Press. pp. 600 pages. ISBN 978-9492722300.
