= Kurume Domain =

Japanese domain of the Edo period

Kurume Domain 久留米藩
- Domain of Japan
- 1620–1871
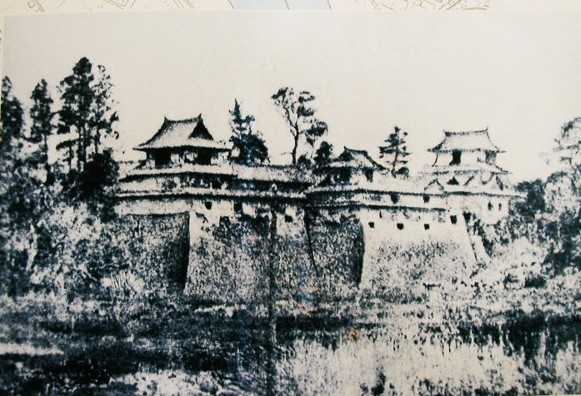
- Kurume Castle in the Bakumatsu period

- Mon of the Arima clan
- Capital: Kurume Castle
- Area
  - Coordinates: 33°19′42.33″N 130°30′27.98″E
  - Type: Daimyō
- Historical era: Edo period
  - Established: 1620
  - Disestablished: 1871
- Today part of: Fukuoka Prefecture

Location of Kurume Castle
Kurume Domain (Japan)

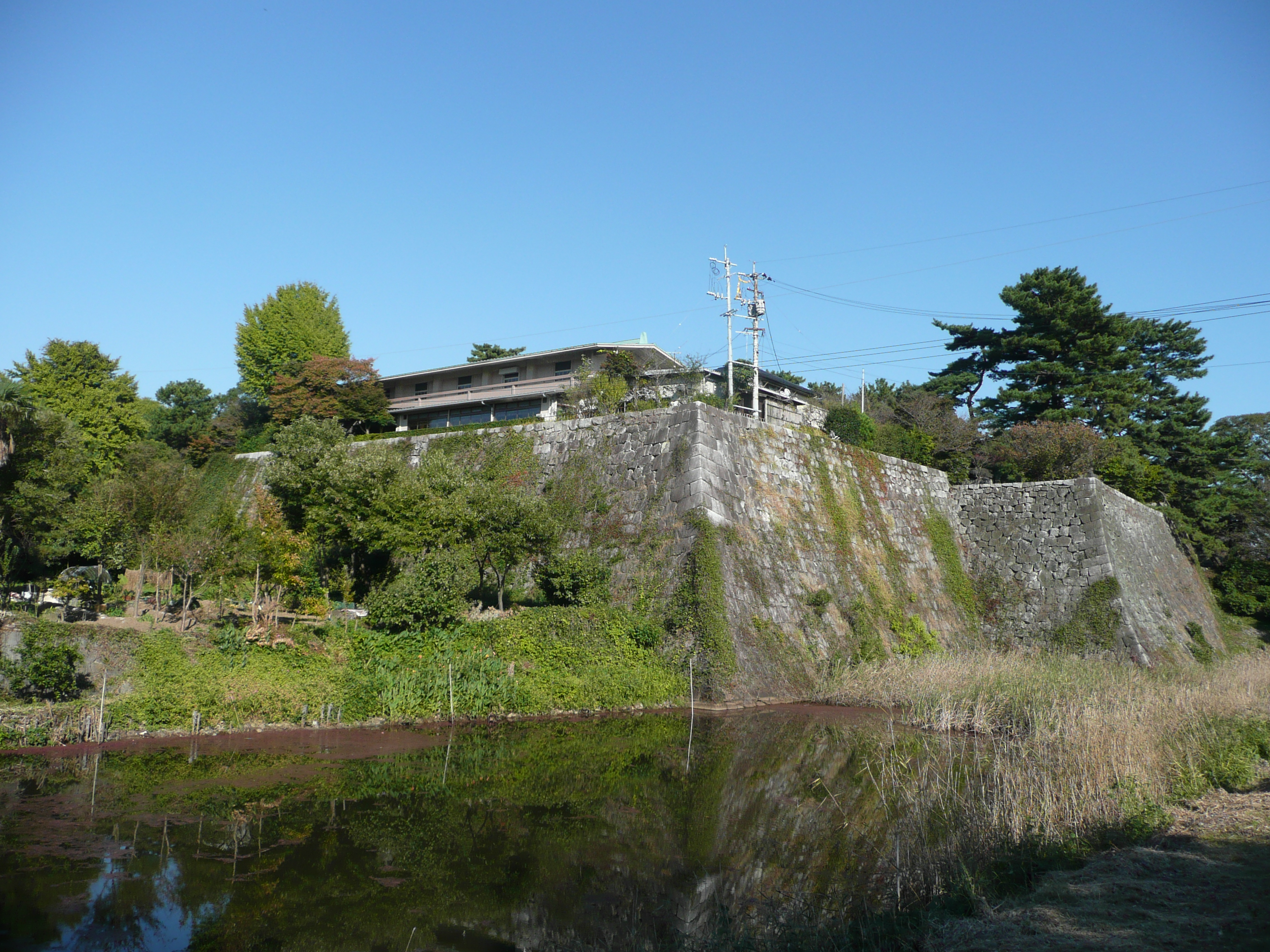
Remains of Kurume Castle (November 4, 2010)

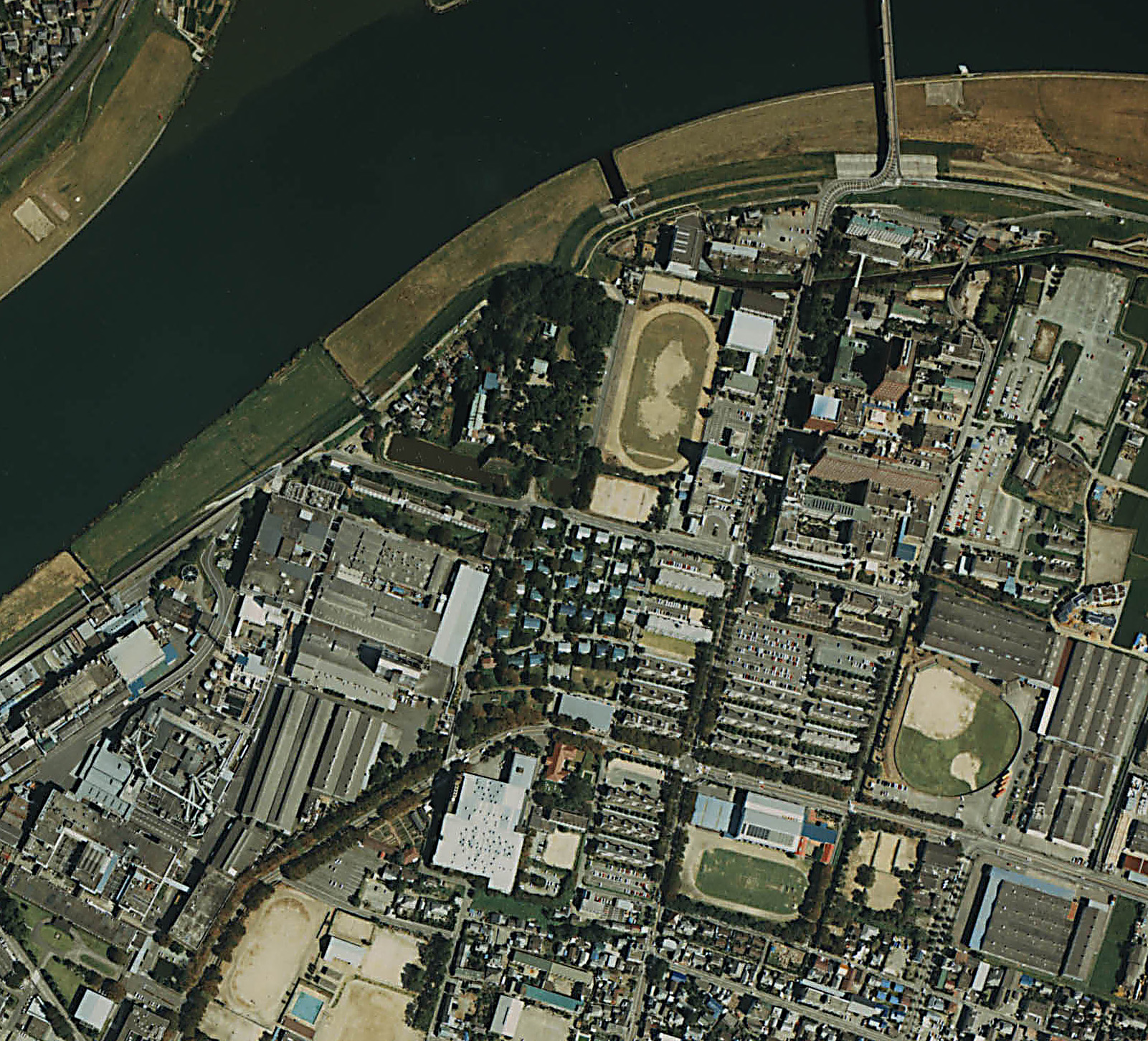
The site of Kurume Castle, as seen from the air

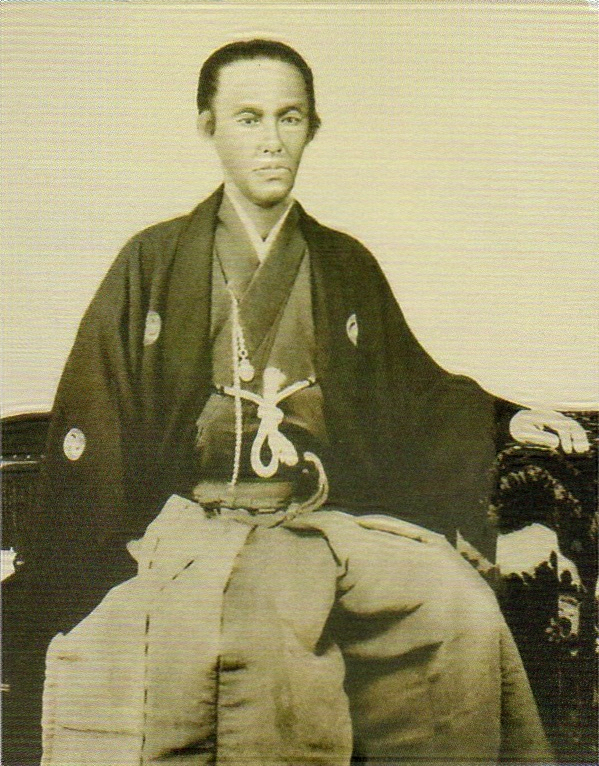
Arima Yorishige, final daimyo of Kurume Domain

Kurume Domain (久留米藩, Kurume-han) was a Japanese domain of the Edo period. It was associated with Chikugo Province in modern-day Fukuoka Prefecture on the island of Kyushu.

== History ==
Following Toyotomi Hideyoshi's conquest of Kyushu of 1586-1587, he assigned Kobayakawa Hidekane a fief of 75,000 koku in three counties of Chikugo Province and renovated Kurume Castle to be his stronghold. Due to his service in the Japanese invasions of Korea (1592–1598), his holdings were increased to 130,000 koku. However, as he sided with the pro-Toyotomi Western Army during the 1600 Battle of Sekigahara, he was dispossessed by the victorious Tokugawa Ieyasu. The Tokugawa shogunate re-assigned his territories to Tanaka Yoshimasa, formerly the castellan of Okazaki Castle in Mikawa Province. Tanaka Yoshimasa made Yanagawa Castle his stronghold, with Kurume Castle assigned to his son Tanaka Yoshinobu as a secondary fortification. During this era Kurume Castle was expanded and modernized but the shogunate ordered that it be destroyed in 1615 under the "one domain-one castle" ordinance. In 1620, when the daimyō of Yanagawa Domain, Tanaka Tadamasa, died without heir, the domain fell to attainder and was divided. The central portion, with a kokudaka of 210,000 koku in central and northern Chikugo (including Kurume) was assigned to Arima Toyouji, formerly daimyō of the 80,000 koku Fukuchiyama Domain in Tanba Province. The significant increase in kokudaka was a reward for his successes during the Siege of Osaka, although history does not record any details as to the nature of these achievements. When the Shimabara Rebellion broke out in 1637, Arima Toyouji was in Edo . Although he was old, he led his forces to Shimabara in person, and during the campaign the domain dispatched more than 6,300 troops and suffered 173 killed and 1412 wounded.

Under Arima Toyouji, Kurume Castle was rebuilt and the jōkamachi castle town developed. From 1664 to 1676, the domain carried out extensive public works projects for flood control and irrigation on the Chikugo River. While aimed at increasing paddy fields and thereby the domain's rice production, the result was severe pressure on the domain's finances. At the time of the fourth daimyō, Arima Yorimoto, the domain was forced to start borrowing money from its own retainers, and in 1681 began issuing hansatsu paper money. Yorimoto was willing to cut back on redundant expenses and became a model for saving money. On the death of the fifth daimyō, Arima Yoriichi, the direct lineage died out, and the sixth daimyō, Arima Naritsugu came from a hatamoto cadet branch of the clan. He took over the reforms to the domain's government for financial reconstruction that had been continued since Yorimoto and which had achieved some success. The seventh daimyō, Arima Yoritsuki, took over as head of the family in 1729 at the age of 16 and remained the lord for the next 54 years. He was famous as a mathematician and author of textbooks on mathematics. However, the Kyōhō famine of 1732 caused many deaths from starvation at a time when the domain was burdened by the shogunate with expenses in rebuilding palaces and repairs along to Tōkaidō. Increased taxes in the domain led to uprisings. The daimyō, Arima Yoritaka, loved sumo and sponsored many wrestlers (including yokozuna Onogawa Kisaburō), he devoted himself to his many hobbies, such as collecting dogs, and ignored the deteriorating finances of the domain. On the other hand, one of the achievements of his tenure is that he opened a han school in 1783, which was named "Shuukan" in 1787; it was later renamed "Meizendo". This disinterest in the domain's finances continued into the tenure of Arima Yorinori, and widespread uprisings occurred in 1832. The 10th daimyō, Arima Yorinaga, attempted reforms in 1846, but fell ill and died young. He was succeeded by his younger brother, Arima Yoshiyori. Conflicts over the reform of the domain finances and administration developed into intense power struggles between factions of retainers, complicated further by conflicts between Sonnō-jōi supporters and pro-Shogunate supporters. In 1852, the Sonnō-jōi faction was suppressed. Kurume Domain attempted to modernize and established a navy, even purchasing a Western-style warship. However, in 1868, the Sonnō-jōi faction was restored when word was received of the defeat of Tokugawa forces at the Battle of Toba-Fushimi and in the domain became an enthusiastic supporter of the new government in the Boshin War. However, there was considerably much less support for ending Japan's national isolation policy and the domain's samurai were important players in both the Two Lords Incident which attempted to overthrow the fledgling Meiji government and the occupation of Kumamoto Castle (the "Kurume clan incident" of 1871).

In July 1871, Kurume Domain became "Kurume Prefecture" with the abolition of the han system. In November of the same year, it was incorporated into "Mizuma Prefecture", and in 1876, it became part of Fukuoka Prefecture. In 1884, Arima Yoritsumu (the son of the last daimyō, Arima Yorishige), became a count in the kazoku peerage.

== Holdings at the end of the Edo period ==
As with most domains in the han system, Kurume Domain consisted of several discontinuous territories calculated to provide the assigned kokudaka, based on periodic cadastral surveys and projected agricultural yields.

Kurume Domain

- Chikugo Province
  - 59 villages in Ikuha District (entire district)
  - 89 villages in Takeno District (entire district)
  - 30 villages in Yamamoto District (entire district)
  - 72 villages in Mii District (entire district)
  - 36 villages in Mihara District (entire district)
  - 137 villages in Mizuma District
  - 27 villages in Shimotsuma District
  - 97 villages in Kamitsuma District

== List of daimyō ==
#	Name	Tenure	Courtesy title	Court Rank	kokudaka
Arima clan, 1620–1868 (fudai daimyō)
1	Arima Toyouji (有馬豊氏),	1620–1642	Genba-no-kami (玄蕃頭)	Junior 4th Rank, Lower Grade (従四位下)	210,000 koku
2	Arima Tadayori (有馬忠頼),	1642–1655	Nakatsukasa-no-taifu (中務大輔)	Junior 4th Rank, Lower Grade (従五位下)	210,000 koku
3	Arima Yoritoshi (有馬頼利),	1655–1668	Genba-no-kami (玄蕃頭)	Junior 4th Rank, Lower Grade (従四位下)	210,000 koku
4	Arima Yorimoto (有馬頼元),	1668–1705	Nakatsukasa-no-taifu (中務大輔)	Junior 4th Rank, Lower Grade (従五位下)	210,000 koku
5	Arima Yorimune (有馬頼旨),	1705–1706	Chikugo-no-kami (筑後守)	Junior 4th Rank, Lower Grade (従五位下)	210,000 koku
6	Arima Norifusa (有馬則維),	1706–1729	Genba-no-kami (玄蕃頭)	Junior 4th Rank, Lower Grade (従四位下)	210,000 koku
7	Arima Yoriyuki (有馬頼徸),	1729–1783	Nakatsukasa-no-taifu (中務大輔)	Junior 4th Rank, Lower Grade (従五位下)	210,000 koku
8	Arima Yoritaka (有馬頼貴),	1784–1812	Sa-shōshō (左少将)	Junior 4th Rank, Lower Grade (従五位下)	210,000 koku
9	Arima Yorinori (有馬頼徳),	1812–1844	Sa-shōshō (左少将)	Junior 4th Rank, Lower Grade (従五位下)	210,000 koku
10	Arima Yoritō (有馬頼永),	1844–1846	Chikugo-no-kami (筑後守)	Junior 4th Rank, Lower Grade (従五位下)	210,000 koku
11	Arima Yorishige (有馬頼咸),	1846–1871	Sa-chūshō(左中将)	Junior 4th Rank, Lower Grade (従五位下)	210,000 koku

=== Genealogy (simplified) ===
- Arima Noriyori, Lord of Sanda (1533–1602)
  - I. Toyouji, 1st daimyō of Kurume (cr. 1620) (1569–1642; r. 1620–1642)
    - II. Tadayori, 2nd daimyō of Kurume (1603–1655; r. 1642–1655)
      - III. Yoritoshi, 3rd daimyō of Kurume (1652–1668; r. 1655–1668)
      - IV. Yorimoto, 4th daimyō of Kurume (1654–1705; r. 1668–1705)
        - V. Yorimune, 5th daimyō of Kurume (1685–1706; r. 1705–1706)
  - A daughter, who m. Ishino (Akamatsu) Ujimitsu (1553–1606)
    - Akamatsu
      - Ishino
        - Ishino
          - Ishino Norikazu
            - VI. Arima Norifusa, 6th daimyō of Kurume (1674–1738; r. 1707–1729)
              - VII. Yoriyuki, 7th daimyō of Kurume (1714–1783; r. 1729–1783)
                - VIII. Yoritaka, 8th daimyō of Kurume (1746–1812; r. 1783–1812)
                  - Yorinao (1779-1805)
                    - IX. Yorinori, 9th daimyō of Kurume (1797–1844; r. 1812–1844)
                      - X. Yorito, 10th daimyō of Kurume (1822–1846; r. 1844–1846)
                        - XI. Yorishige, 11th daimyō, 1st Governor (1828–1893; daimyō: 1846–1869; Governor: 1869–1871)
                          - Yoritsumu, 1st Count (1864–1927; Count: 1884)
                            - Yoriyasu, 2nd Count (1884–1957; Count: 1927–1947)
                              - Yorichika (1918–1980)
                                - Yorinaka (b. 1959)

== See also ==
- List of Han
- Abolition of the han system
