= Chikugo River =

River in Kyūshū, Japan

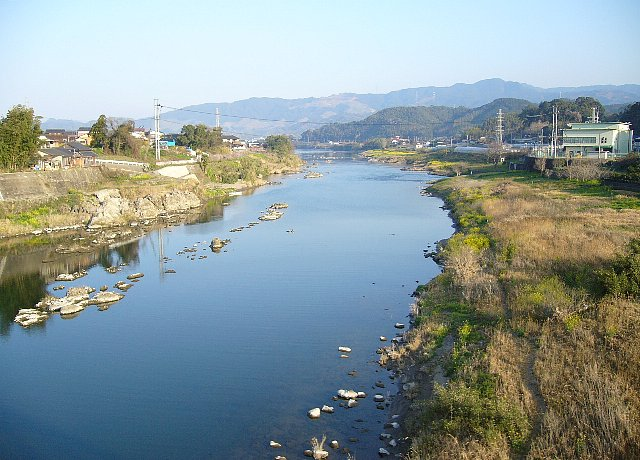
- Chikugo River at Ukiha-Hita

- Location within Japan
- Native name: 筑後川 (Japanese)

Location
- Country: Japan

Physical characteristics
- Source
  - location: Mount Aso, Kyūshū
  - coordinates: 33.0866°N 131.1656°E
- Mouth
  - location: Ariake Sea
  - coordinates: 33.1398°N 130.3408°E}
  - elevation: 0 m (0 ft)
- Length: 143 km (89 mi)
- Basin size: 2,860 km^{2} (1,100 sq mi)
- Discharge
  - average: 94.09 m^{3}/s (3,323 cu ft/s)

Basin features
- River system: Chikugo River

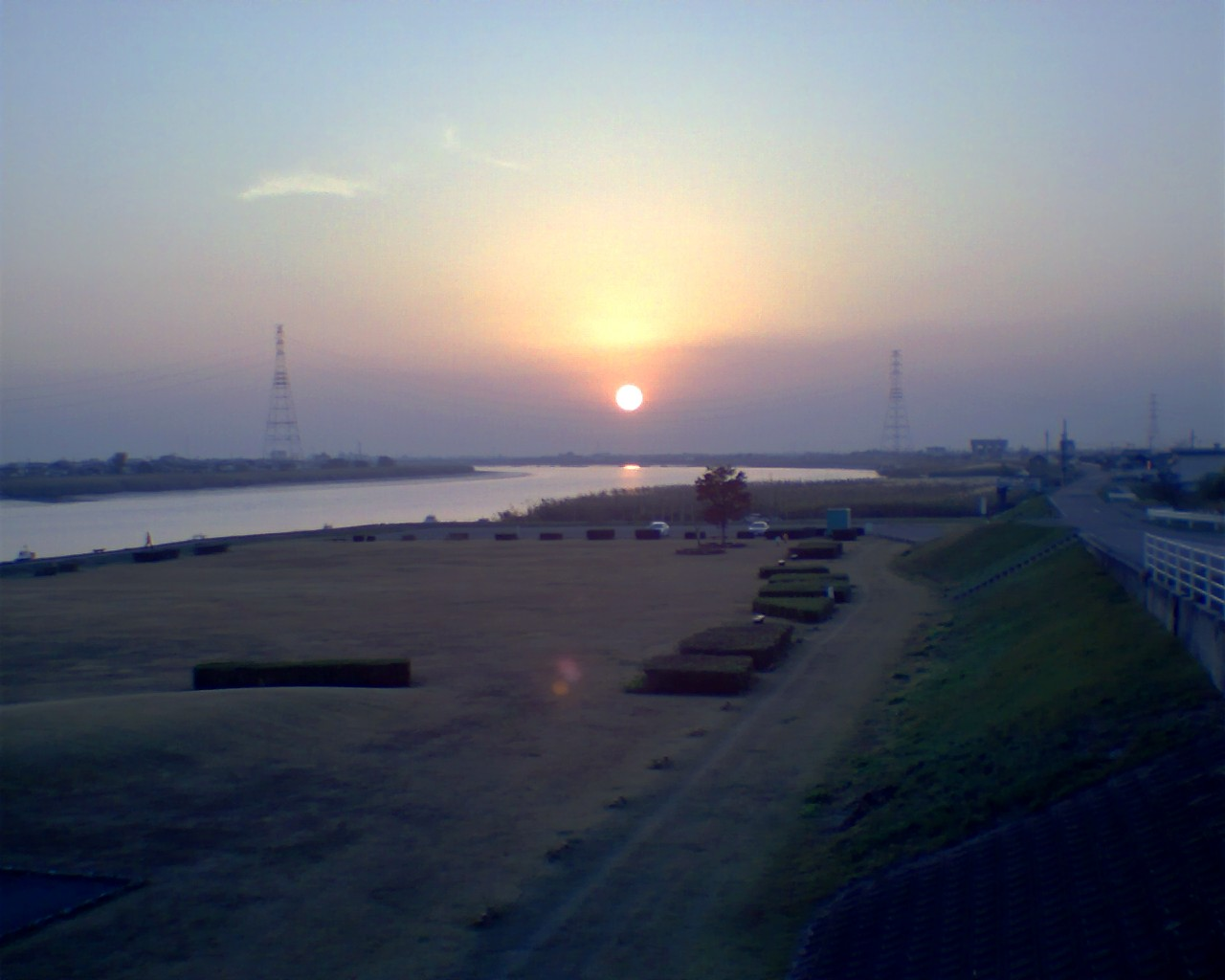
Chikugo River in Kurume, Fukuoka

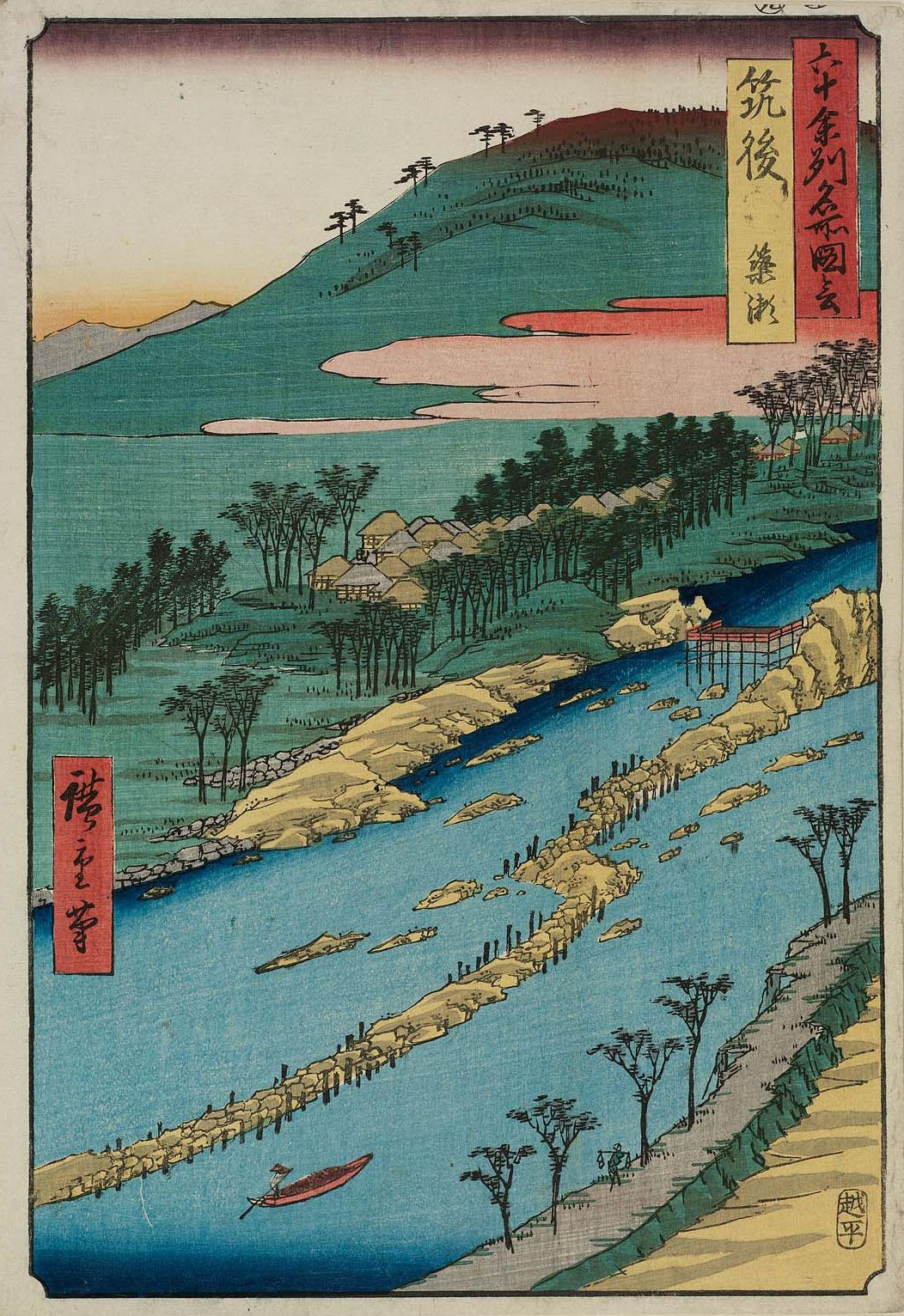
Hiroshige

The Chikugo River (筑後川, Chikugo-gawa) flows through Kumamoto, Ōita, Fukuoka and Saga prefectures in Japan. With a total length of 143 kilometres (89 mi), it is the longest river on Kyūshū. It flows from Mount Aso and empties into the Ariake Sea. It is also nicknamed "Tsukushi Jirō".

The upper reaches of the Class A river are important to forestry, and the middle and lower reaches are important to local agriculture, providing irrigation to some 400 square kilometres (154 mi^{2}) of rice fields on the Tsukushi Plain. The river is also important to industry, with twenty electrical power plants located along its banks, as well as the major city of Kurume in Fukuoka Prefecture. Recognizing the requirement to satisfy divergent needs of various communities along the river, the Japanese Ministry of Land, Infrastructure, Transport and Tourism designated the Chikugo River (along with six other river systems in Japan) as a "Water Resources Development River System" with a comprehensive utilization plan to develop the river's resources.

The Chikugogawa Onsen Fireworks, held annually on July 28, are the largest fireworks display in Kyūshū. The event has been held since 1650 on the riverbanks at Kurume.

== See also ==
- Chikugo River Lift Bridge
