= Nishi-Tachiarai Station =

Railway station in Tachiarai, Fukuoka Prefecture, Japan

Nishi-Tachiarai Station 西太刀洗駅
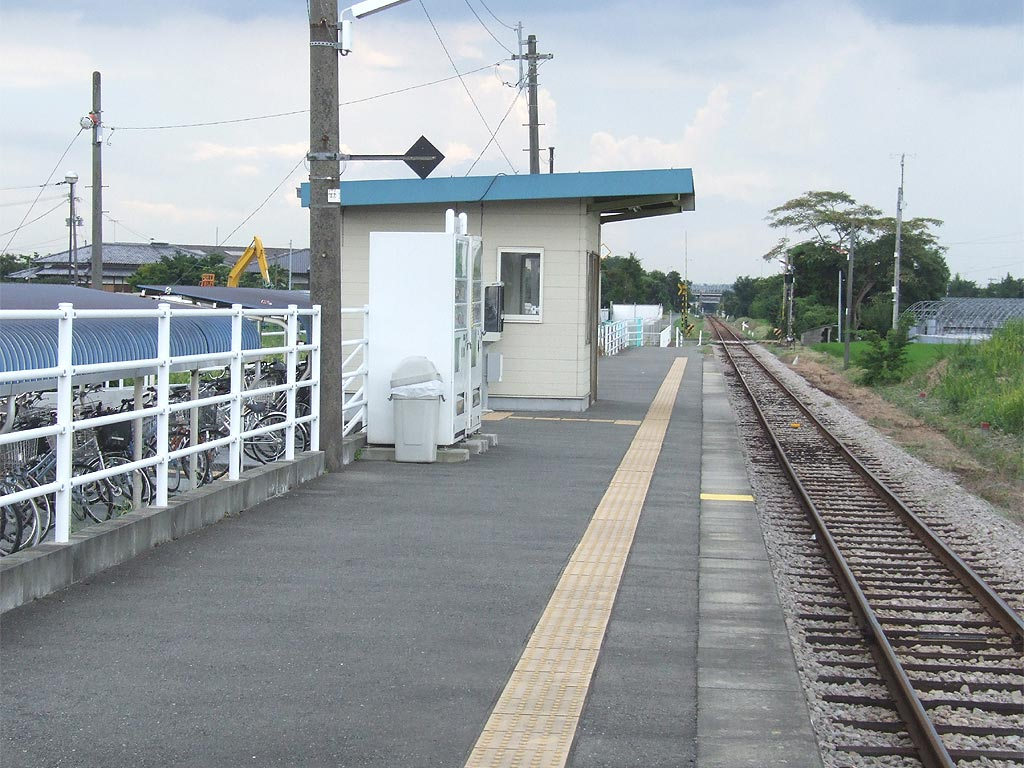
- Nishi-Tachiarai Station in 2008

General information
- Location: Yamaguma, Tachiarai-machi, Mii-gun, Fukuoka-ken 830-1226; Japan
- Coordinates: 33°24′28.22″N 130°35′57.69″E
- Operator: Amagi Railway
- Line: ■ Amagi Line
- Distance: 8.4 km from Kiyama
- Platforms: 1 side platform
- Tracks: 1

Construction
- Structure type: At grade
- Parking: Available
- Cycle facilities: Bike shed
- Accessible: Yes - ramp to platform

Other information
- Status: Unstaffed

History
- Opened: 28 April 1939

Passengers
- FY2018: 183
Location
- Location within Fukuoka Prefecture Location within Japan

Nishi-Tachiarai Station (西太刀洗駅, Nishi-Tachiarai-eki) is a passenger railway station located in the town of Tachiarai, Fukuoka Prefecture, Japan. It is operated by the Amagi Railway, a third sector public-private partnership corporation. Although the station's address is in Tachiarai, most of the platform extends across the border into the neighboring city of Ogōri, Fukuoka.

== Lines ==
The station is served by the Amagi Railway Amagi Line and is located 8.4 km from the start of the line at Kiyama. All Amagi Line trains stop at the station.

== Layout ==
The station consists of a side platform serving a single bi-directional track. There is no station building but an enclosed shelter is provided on the platform for waiting passengers. Access to the platform is by a flight of steps or a ramp. A bike shed is provided by the station entrance and parking for cars is available.

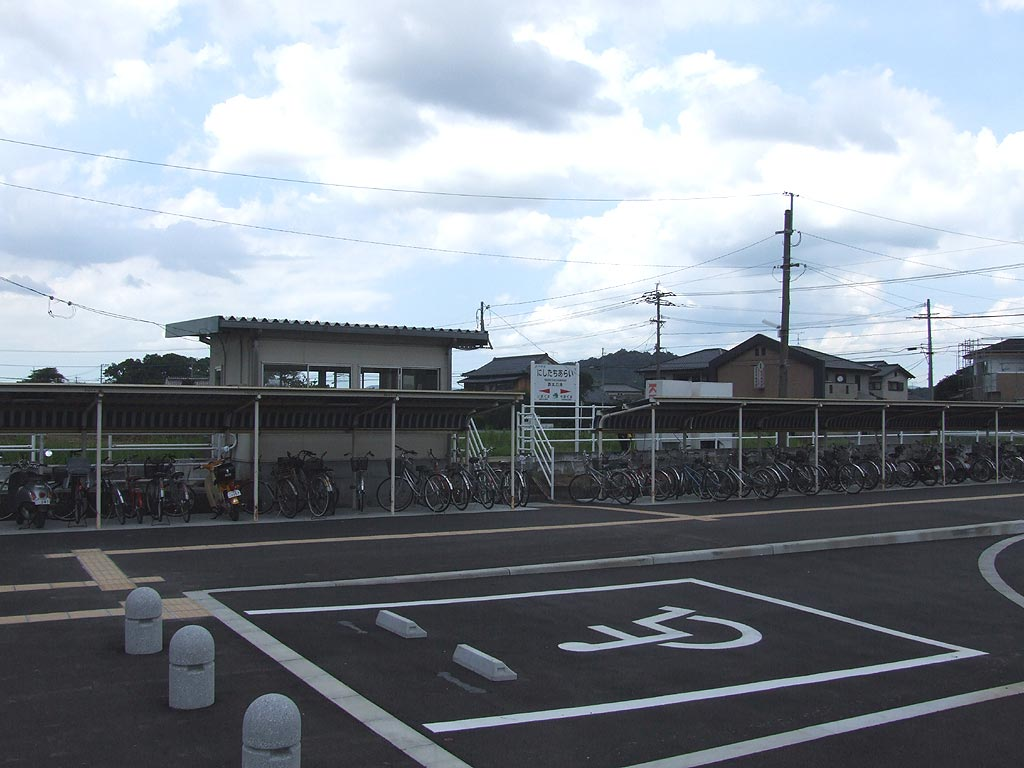
Nishi-Tachiarai Station entrance.

=== Platforms ===
1	■ Amagi Line	for Kiyama and Amagi

== Adjacent stations ==
←	Service	→
Amagi Railway Amagi Line
Imaguma	Local	Yamaguma

== History ==
Japanese Government Railways (JGR) opened the station was opened on 28 April 1939 as an intermediate station on its Amagi Line between Kiyama and Amagi. On 1 April 1986, control of the station was handed over to the Amagi Railway.

== Surrounding area ==
- Shiroyama Park
- Tachiarai Park
- Maruyama Hospital
- Kikuchi Post Office
- Kikuchi Nursery
- Kikuchi Elementary School
- Japan National Route 500
- Oita Expressway

== See also ==
- List of railway stations in Japan
