= Imaguma Station =

Railway station in Ogōri, Fukuoka Prefecture, Japan

Imaguma Station 今隈駅
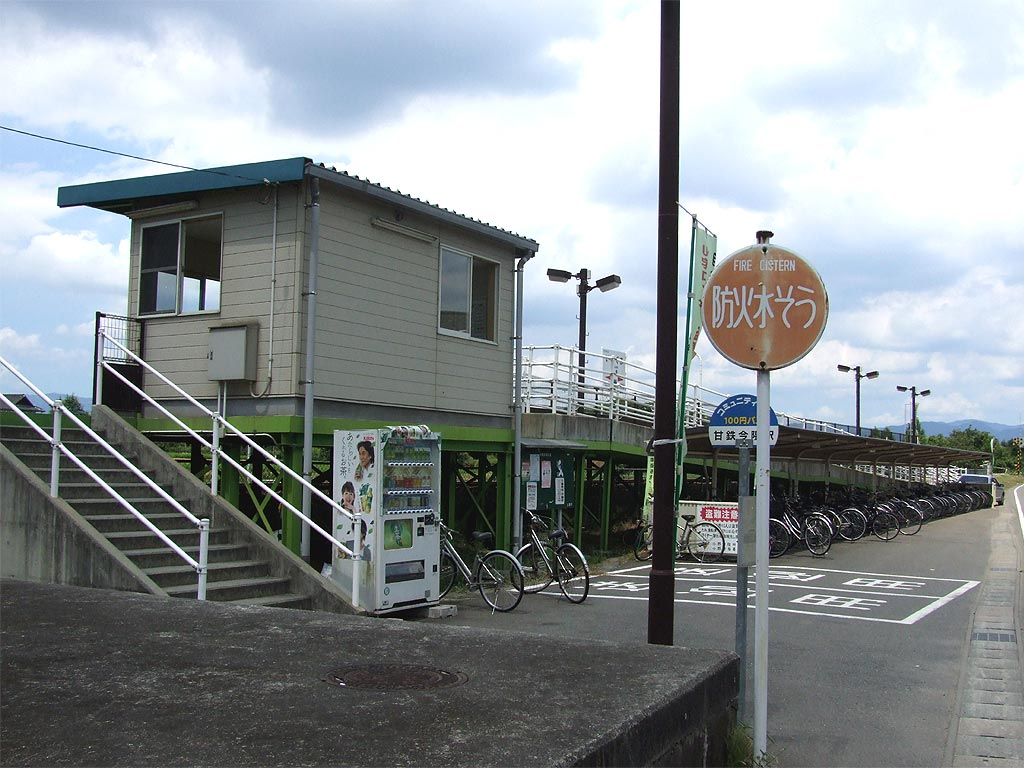
- The entrance of Imaguma Station in 2006

General information
- Location: Yamaguma, Ogori-shi, Fukuoka-ken 838-0113; Japan
- Coordinates: 33°24′13.76″N 130°35′38.34″E
- Operator: Amagi Railway
- Line: ■ Amagi Line
- Distance: 7.7 km from Kiyama
- Platforms: 1 side platform
- Tracks: 1

Construction
- Structure type: At grade
- Parking: Available
- Cycle facilities: Bike shed
- Accessible: Yes - ramp leads to platform

Other information
- Status: Unstaffed

History
- Opened: 1 December 2002

Passengers
- FY2018: 113
Location
- Location within Fukuoka Prefecture Location within Japan

Imaguma Station (今隈駅, Imaguma-eki) is a passenger railway station located in the city of Ogōri, Fukuoka Prefecture, Japan. It is operated by the Amagi Railway, a third sector public-private partnership corporation.

== Lines ==
The station is served by the Amagi Railway Amagi Line and is located 7.7 km from the start of the line at Kiyama. All Amagi Line trains stop at the station.

== Layout ==
The station consists of a side platform serving a single bi-directional track. There is no station building but an enclosed shelter is provided on the platform for waiting passengers. Access to the platform is by a flight of steps or a ramp. A bike shed is provided by the station entrance and parking for cars is available.

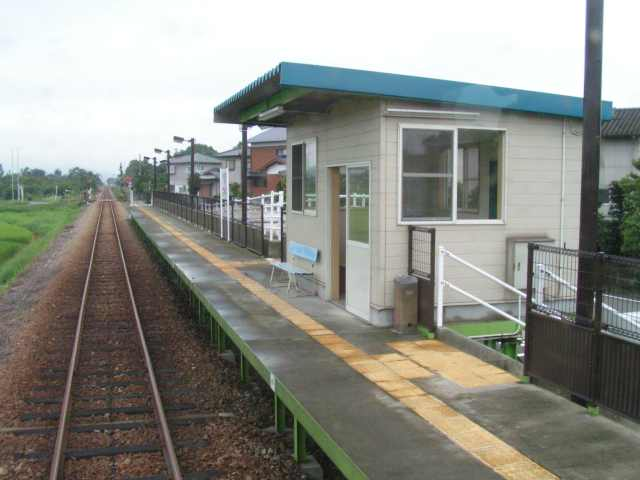
A view of the station platform and track.

=== Platforms ===
1	■ Amagi Line	for Kiyama and Amagi

== Adjacent stations ==
←	Service	→
Amagi Railway Amagi Line
Matsuzaki	Local	Nishi-Tachiarai

== History ==
Amagi Railway opened the station on 1 December 2002 as an added station on the existing Amagi Line track.

== Surrounding area ==
- Japan National Route 500
- Oita Expressway Chikugo Ogōri Interchange

== See also ==
- List of railway stations in Japan
