= Ogōri Kanga ruins =

Archaeological site in Japan

Ogōri Kanga ruins complex
- 小郡官衙遺跡 (Japanese)
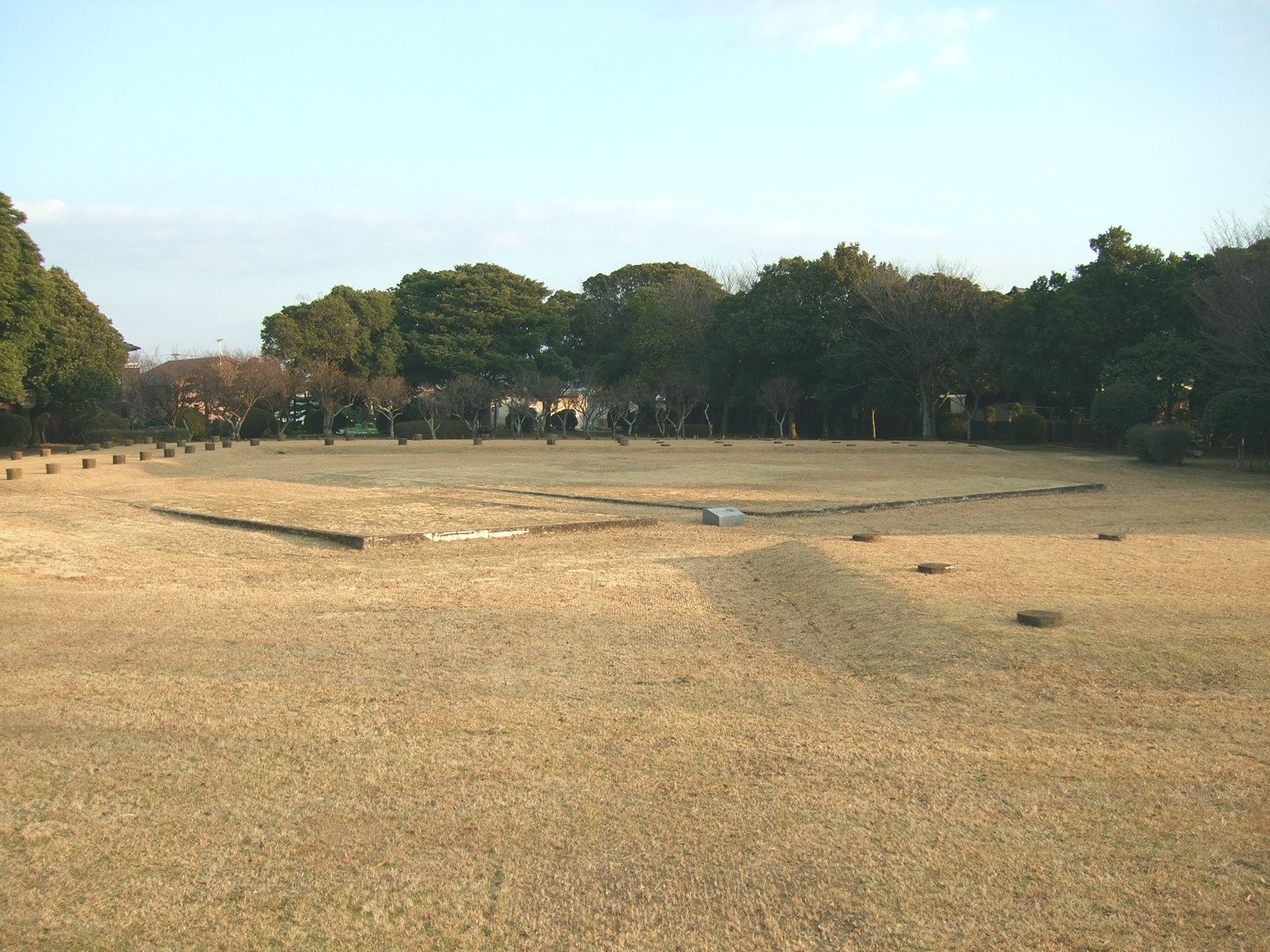
- Ogōri Kanga ruins

- Ogōri Kanga ruins Ogōri Kanga ruins (Japan)
- Interactive map of Ogōri Kanga ruins complex
- 33°24′05″N 130°33′24″E
- Periods: Nara period
- Location: Ogōri, Fukuoka, Japan
- Region: Kyushu

History
- Built: 7th century AD

Site notes
- Elevation: 27 m (89 ft)

The Ogōri Kanga ruins complex (小郡官衙遺跡, Ogōri Kanga iseki gun) is an archaeological site with the ruins of a Nara to Heian period government administrative complex located in what is now the city of Ogōri in Fukuoka prefecture in northern Kyushu, Japan. The site has been protected as a National Historic Site from 1971 with the area under protection expanded in 2001.

== Overview ==
In the late Nara period, after the establishment of a centralized government under the Ritsuryō system, local rule over the provinces was standardized under a kokufu (provincial capital), and each province was divided into smaller administrative districts, known as (郡, gun, kōri), composed of two to 20 townships in 715 AD. Each of the units had an administrative complex, or kanga (官衙遺跡) built on a semi-standardized layout based on contemporary Chinese design, similar to that of the kokufu, but on a much smaller scale. With a square layout or rectangular layout, each had office buildings for administration, taxation, and security, as well as granaries for tax rice and other taxable produce. In the periphery there was typically a Buddhist temple with some official standing. This system collapsed with the growth of feudalism in the Late Heian period, and the location of many of the kanga is now lost.

The Ogōri Kanga ruins are located on a low plateau in the northern part of the Chikugo Plain. It built around the latter half of the 7th century as the kanga for Mihara District in Chikugo Province. As a result of several excavations conducted from 1967, the foundations buildings with dug-out pillars and warehouses arranged in an orderly manner dating back to three periods, from the late 7th century to the late 8th century, were confirmed.Roof tiles, inkstones, and earthenware with writing on them were also unearthed.

The first period was in the latter half of the 7th century, only three buildings, which appear to be warehouses, have been confirmed, and the overall scale of the ruins is unclear. It appears to have been destroyed in the Great Chikugo Earthquake of 678. The second period of buildings, which is thought to have been dated from the beginning of the 8th century, contained three groups of structures arranged in the typical "U"-shaped configuration of kanga ruins, with what appears to be the county office, a kitchen complex to the west, and storehouses to the north. In the third period, from the mid to late 8th century, the facilities similar to those in the second period, but over a thousand iron arrowheads were excavated from a ditch on the side of the facility, which is presumed to be an armory. It is theorized that in the third period, the civil administrative functions of the complex were transferred to the Shimotakahashi Kanga, permitting the Ogōri site to take on more of a purely military role.

The associated Kamiiwata ruins (上岩田遺跡) are located on a fan-shaped plateau on the left bank of the Homan River. An archaeological excavation was conducted in 1996–1999, which determined that the remains covered an area of 16.6 hectares. A settlement with pit dwellings existed on this site from the Jōmon period to the Nara period, followed by buried pillar foundation buildings and various styles of graves. The final period, from the late 7th century to the early 9th century, contains the ruins of a Buddhist temple that appears to have been associated with the Ogōri Kanga complex.

A part of the ruins has been developed as an archaeological park and some of the excavated artifacts are displayed at the Ogōri City Buried Cultural Properties Research Center. The Ogōri Kanga ruins are about a ten-minute walk from Nishitetsu Ogōri Station on the Nishitetsu Tenjin Omuta Line. The Kamiiwata ruins are a short walk from Matsuzaki Station on the Amagi Railway Amagi Line.

== See also ==
- List of Historic Sites of Japan (Fukuoka)
