= Ōitai Station =

Railway station in Ogōri, Fukuoka Prefecture, Japan

Ōitai Station 大板井駅
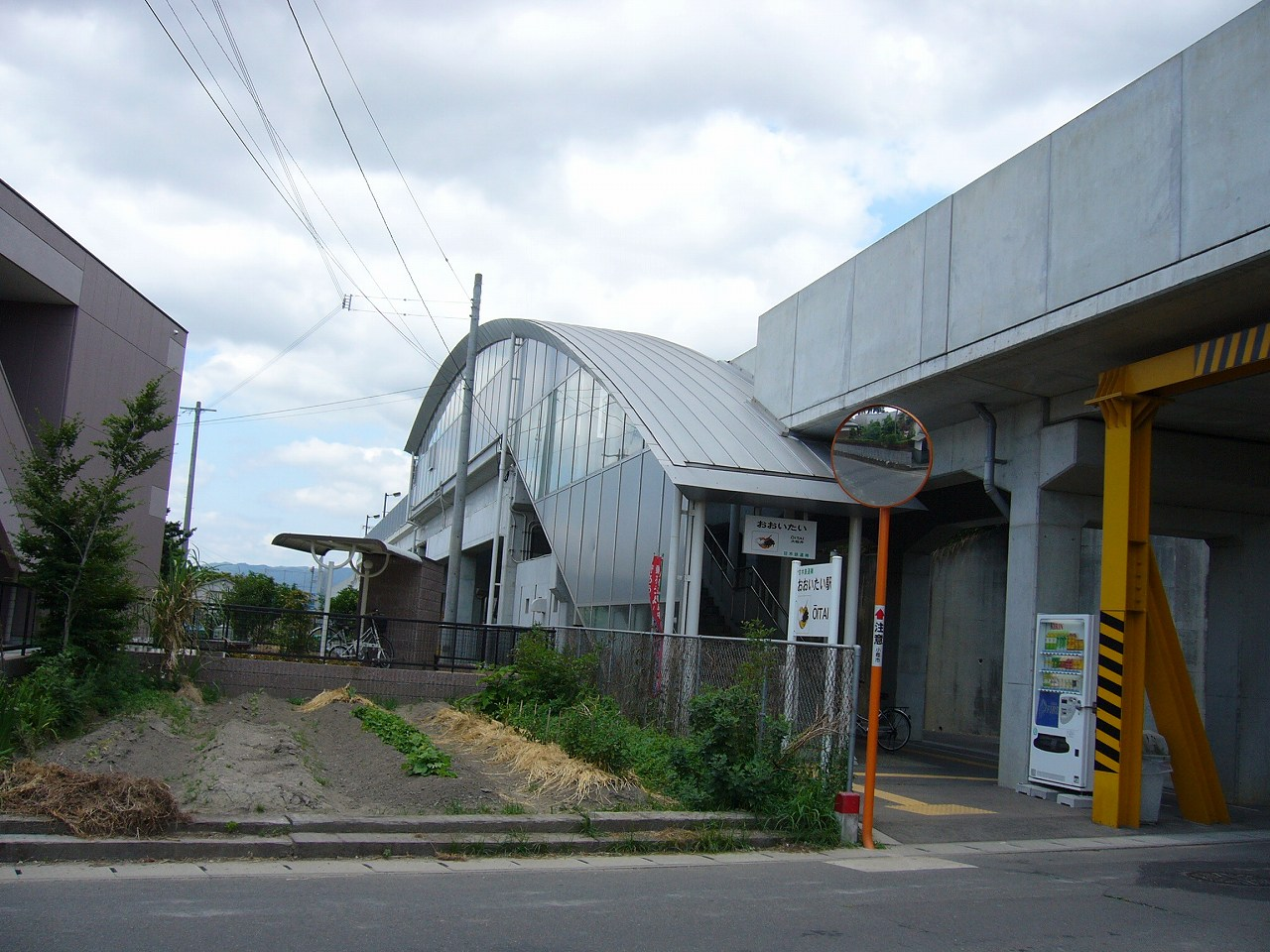
- Ōitai Station in 2007

General information
- Location: Oitai, Ogori-shi, Fukuoka-ken 838-0142; Japan
- Coordinates: 33°23′54.69″N 130°33′39.65″E
- Operator: Amagi Railway
- Line: ■ Amagi Line
- Distance: 4.5 km from Kiyama
- Platforms: 1 side platform
- Tracks: 1
- Connections: Nishitetsu Express Bus

Construction
- Structure type: Elevated

Other information
- Status: Unstaffed

History
- Opened: 1 November 1987

Passengers
- FY2018: 60
Location
- Location within Fukuoka Prefecture Location within Japan

Ōitai Station (大板井駅, Ōitai-eki) is a passenger railway station located in the city of Ogōri, Fukuoka Prefecture, Japan. It is operated by the Amagi Railway, a third sector public-private partnership corporation.

== Lines ==
The station is served by the Amagi Railway Amagi Line and is located 4.5 km from the start of the line at Kiyama. All Amagi Line trains stop at the station.

== Layout ==
The station consists of a side platform serving a single elevated track. There is no station building but the platform has a shelter for waiting passengers. Access to the platform is by means of a flight of steps. A toilet building has been built under the elevated structure. Another flight of steps near the station entrance provides access to the connecting bus stop for the Nishitetsu Express Bus. This stop is located on the Oita Expressway which is at the same level as the elevated railway track.

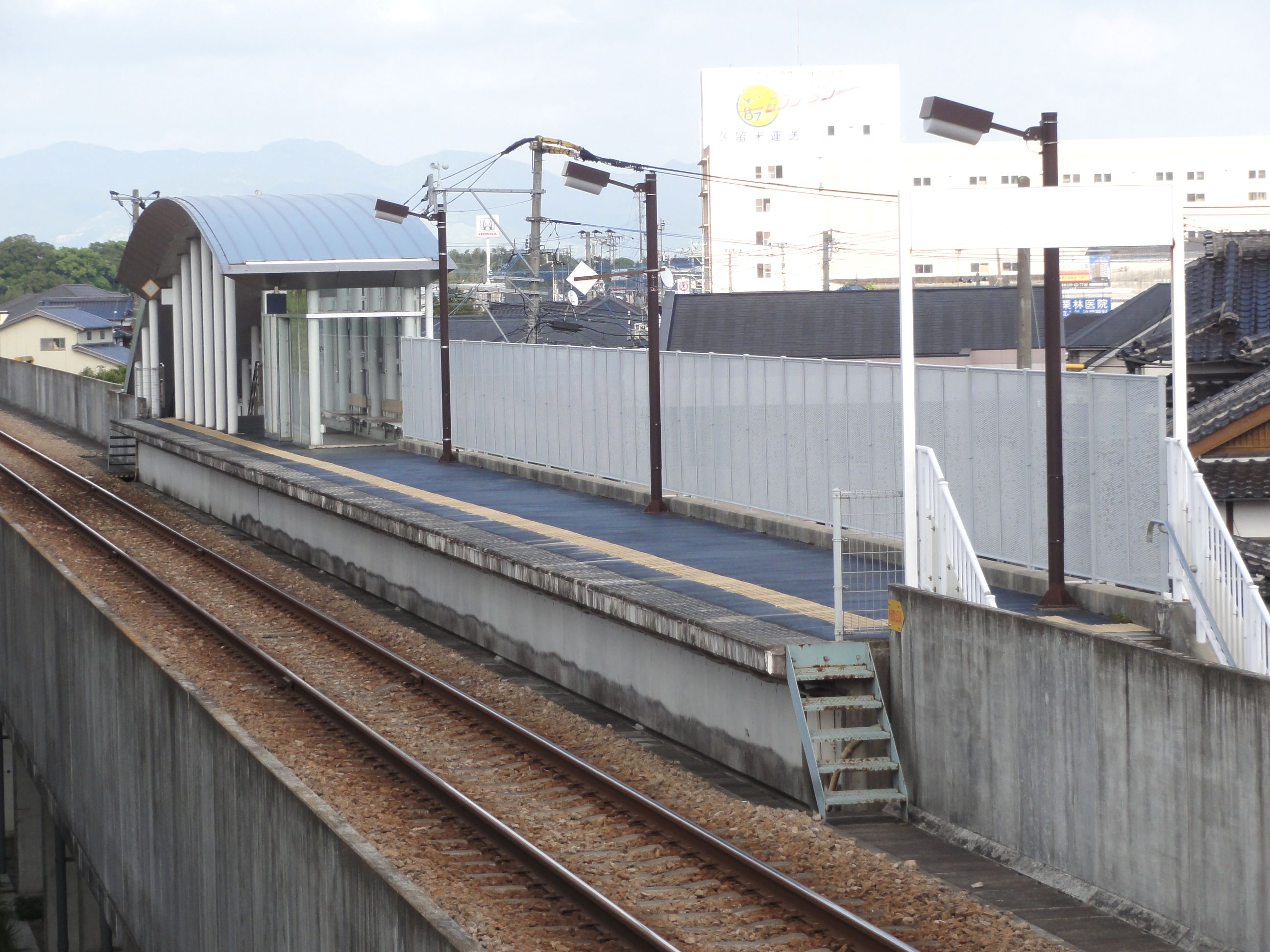
A view of the station platform and track.

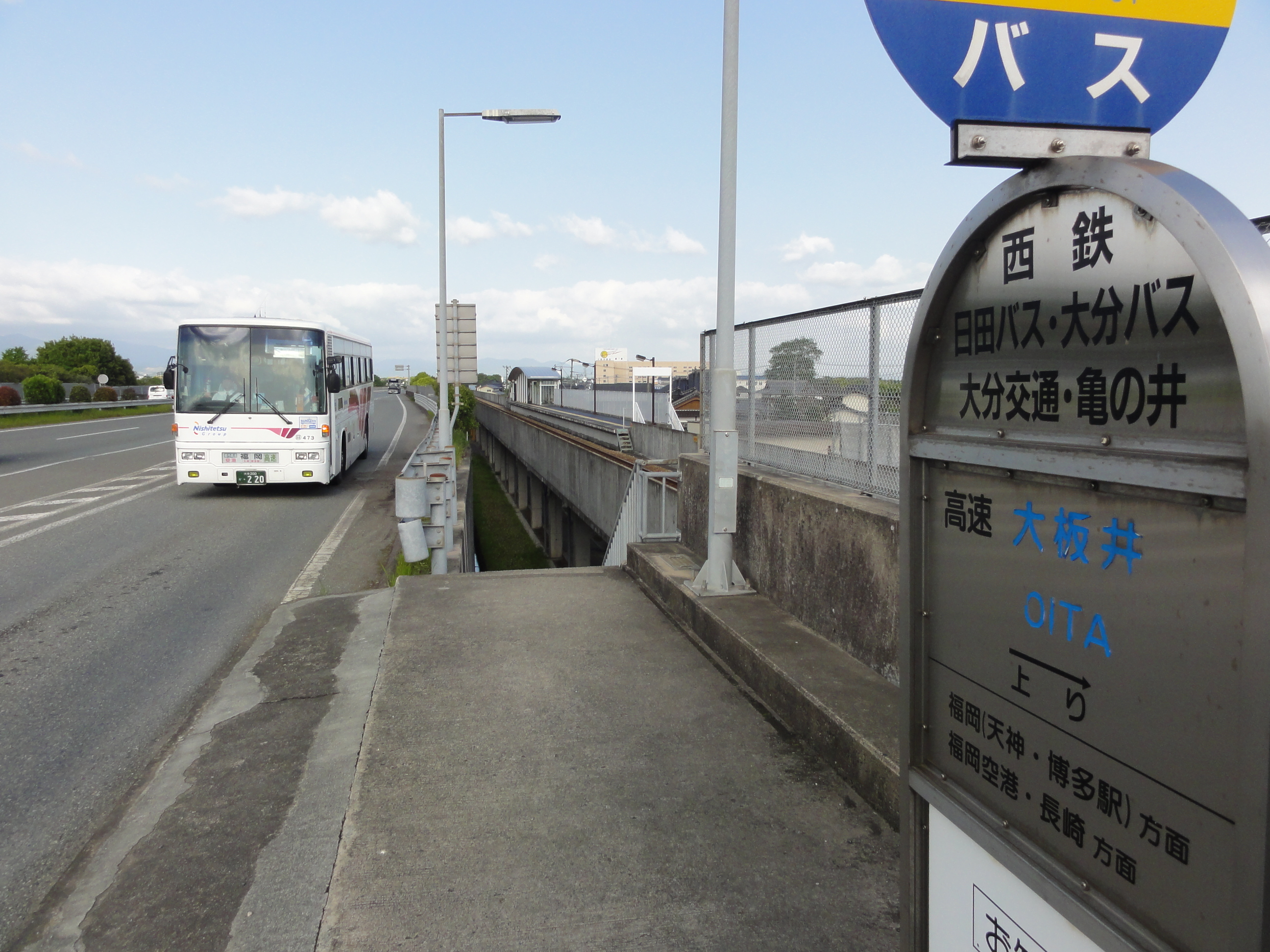
Express bus stop. Note station to the right is at the same level as the highway. The steps descend below the elevated tracks where another flight of steps leads to the station platform.

=== Platforms ===
1	■ Amagi Line	for Kiyama, and Amagi

== Adjacent stations ==
←	Service	→
Amagi Railway Amagi Line
Ogōri	Local	Matsuzaki

== History ==
Amagi Railway opened the station on 1 November 1987 as an added station on the existing Amagi Line track.

== Surrounding area ==
- Ogōri City Culture Center
- Ogōri City Library
- Ogōri City Gymnasium
- Ogōri City Police Station
- Ogōri Post Office
- Ogōri City Hall
- Aeon Ogōri Shopping Center
- Oita Expressway
- Japan National Route 500

== See also ==
- List of railway stations in Japan
