= Takata Station (Fukuoka) =

Railway station in Chikuzen, Fukuoka Prefecture, Japan

Takata Station 高田駅
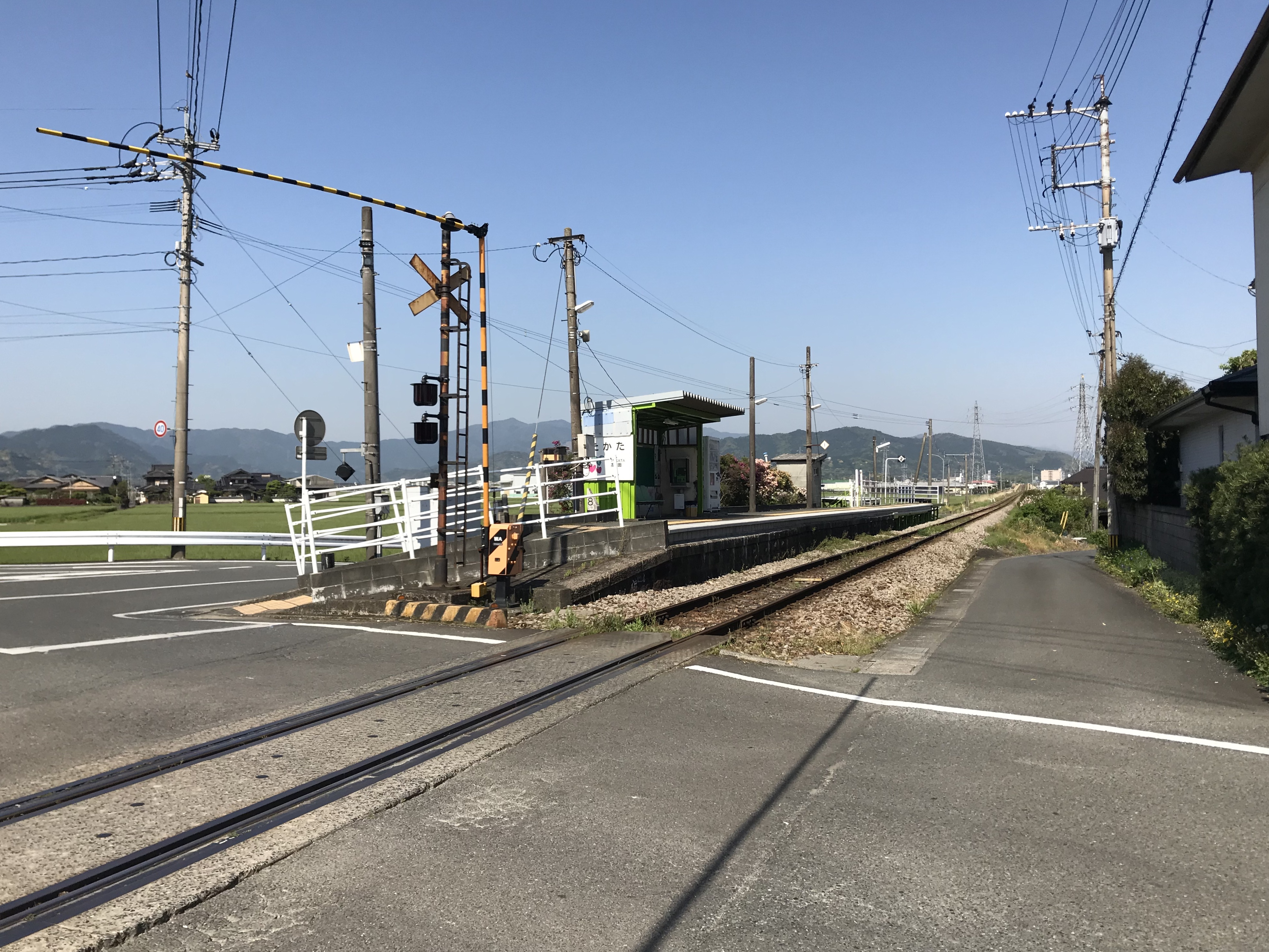
- Station platform

General information
- Location: Takata, Chikuzen-machi, Asakura-gun, Fukuoka-ken 838-0814; Japan
- Coordinates: 33°24′51.1″N 130°38′1.5″E
- Operator: Amagi Railway
- Line: ■ Amagi Line
- Distance: 11.8 km from Kiyama
- Platforms: 1 side platform
- Tracks: 1

Construction
- Structure type: At grade
- Cycle facilities: Bike shed
- Accessible: Yes - ramp leads up to platform

Other information
- Status: Unstaffed

History
- Opened: 1 November 1960
- Former names: Chikuzen Takata (until 1 April 1986)

Passengers
- FY2018: 73
Location
- Location within Fukuoka Prefecture Location within Japan

Takata Station (高田駅, Takata-eki) is a passenger railway station located in the town of Chikuzen, Fukuoka Prefecture, Japan. It is operated by the Amagi Railway, a third sector public-private partnership corporation.

== Lines ==
The station is served by the Amagi Railway Amagi Line and is located11.8 km from the start of the line at Kiyama. All Amagi Line trains stop at the station.

== Layout ==
The station consists of a side platform serving a single bi-directional track. There is no station building, only a shelter on the platform for waiting passengers. A ramp leads up to the platform from the access road. A bike shed is provided near the station entrance.

=== Platforms ===
1	■ Amagi Line	for Kiyama and Amagi

== Adjacent stations ==
←	Service	→
Amagi Railway Amagi Line
Tachiarai	Local	Amagi

== History ==
Japanese National Railways (JNR) opened the station on 1 November 1960 with the name Chikuzen Takata Station (筑前高田駅) as an added station on its existing Amagi Line track. On 1 April 1986, control of the station was handed over to the Amagi Railway. The name of the station was changed to Takata on the same day.

== Surrounding area ==
- Kirin Brewery Fukuoka Factory
- Japan National Route 500

== See also ==
- List of railway stations in Japan
