= Shimotakahashi Kanga ruins =

Archaeological site in Japan

- 下高橋官衙遺跡 (Japanese)
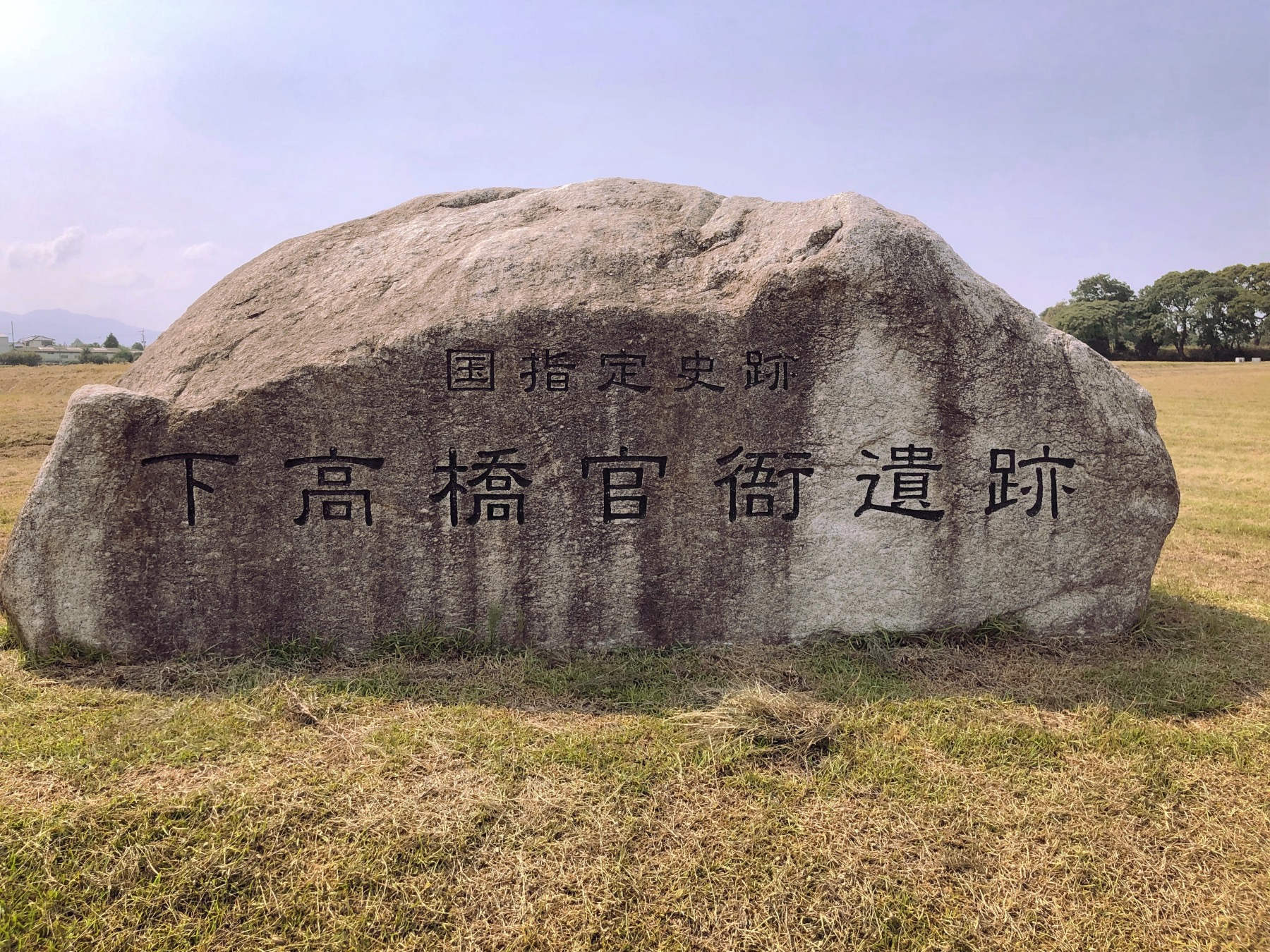
- Shimotakahashi Kanga ruins

- Shimotakahashi Kanga ruins Shimotakahashi Kanga ruins (Japan)
- Interactive map of Shimotakahashi Kanga ruins
- 33°23′15″N 130°35′23″E
- Periods: Nara period
- Location: Tachiarai, Fukuoka, Japan
- Region: Kyushu

History
- Built: 8th century AD

Site notes
- Elevation: 27 m (89 ft)

The Shimotakahashi Kanga ruins (下高橋官衙遺跡, Shimotakahashi Kanga iseki) is an archaeological site with the ruins of a Nara to Heian period government administrative complex located in what is now the town of Tachiarai in Fukuoka prefecture in northern Kyushu, Japan. The site has been protected as a National Historic Site from 1998.

== Overview ==
In the late Nara period, after the establishment of a centralized government under the Ritsuryō system, local rule over the provinces was standardized under a kokufu (provincial capital), and each province was divided into smaller administrative districts, known as (郡, gun, kōri), composed of two to 20 townships in 715 AD. Each of the units had an administrative complex, or kanga (官衙遺跡) built on a semi-standardized layout based on contemporary Chinese design, similar to that of the kokufu, but on a much smaller scale. With a square layout or rectangular layout, each had office buildings for administration, taxation, and security, as well as granaries for tax rice and other taxable produce. In the periphery there was typically a Buddhist temple with some official standing. This system collapsed with the growth of feudalism in the Late Heian period, and the location of many of the kanga is now lost.

The Tachiarai Kanga ruins are located in the northern part of the Chikugo Plain, on the east side of the Homan River, with a view to the southwest. The ruins are roughly divided into two rectangular sections parallel to each other from east-to-west. In the eastern section (the "Umayamoto ruins"), the foundations for more than 30 large-scale dug-out pillar buildings were discovered in a rectangular area approximately 170 meters square surrounded by double ditches of different sizes. In the western section (the "Ueno ruins"), the foundations for more than 18 large-scale dug-out pillared buildings in a rectangular area of more than 170 meters from north-to-south and 150 meters from east-to-west, surrounded by a large ditch. Of these, 13 are elevated warehouses that are believed to have been used to store tax rice. In the 8th century, this area belonged to Mihara District of Chikugo Province; however, but the Ogōri Kanga ruins discovered in 1967 have been identified as the kanga complex for Mihara District. The Ogōri Kanga was built from the latter half of the 7th century to the 8th century, and from around the middle of the 8th century, a large number of iron arrowheads were unearthed, from the partition ditch, indicating that the site had become more military-oriented. It is theorized that the civilian administrative functions were transferred from the Ogōri Kanga to the Shimotakahashi Kanga, permitting the Ogōri site to take on more of a purely military role.

The site is approximately a 20-minute walk from Matsuzaki Station on the Amagi Railway Amagi Line.

== See also ==
- List of Historic Sites of Japan (Fukuoka)
