= Tachiarai Station =

Railway station in Chikuzen, Fukuoka Prefecture, Japan

Tachiarai Station 太刀洗駅
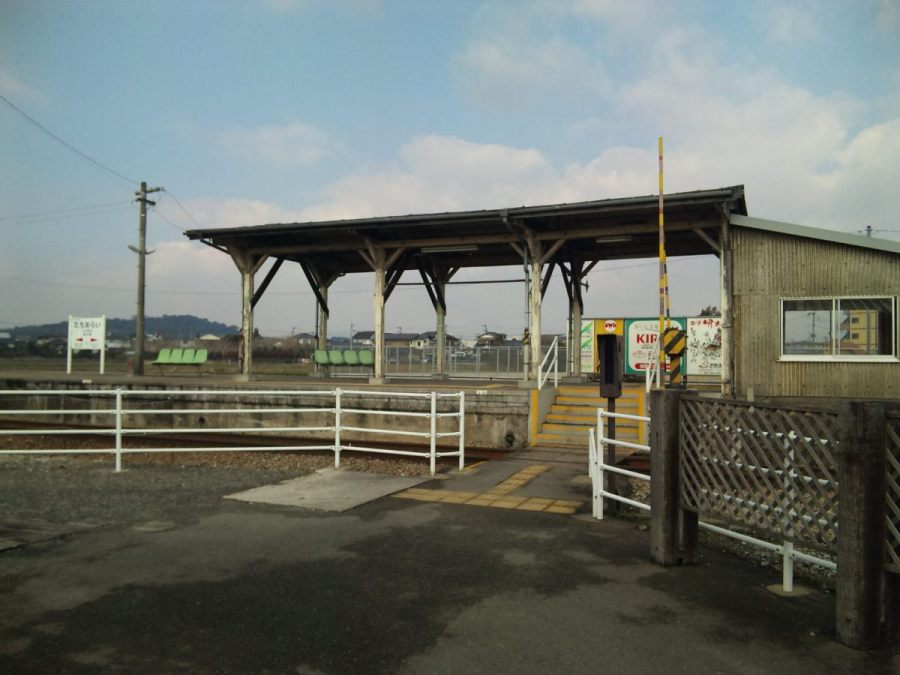
- Station platform

General information
- Location: Takata, Chikuzen-machi, Asakura-gun, Fukuoka-ken 838-0814; Japan
- Coordinates: 33°24′49.51″N 130°37′8.02″E
- Operator: Amagi Railway
- Line: ■ Amagi Line
- Distance: 10.4 km from Kiyama
- Platforms: 1 island platform
- Tracks: 2

Construction
- Structure type: At grade

Other information
- Status: Unstaffed

History
- Opened: 28 April 1939

Passengers
- FY2018: 260
Location
- Location within Fukuoka Prefecture Location within Japan

Tachiarai Station (太刀洗駅, Tachiarai-eki) is a passenger railway station on the Amagi Line located in Chikuzen, Fukuoka, Japan. It is operated by the Amagi Railway, a third sector public-private partnership corporation.

== Lines ==
The station is served by the Amagi Railway Amagi Line and is located 10.4 km from the start of the line at Kiyama.

== Layout ==
The station consists of one unnumbered island platform connected to the station building by a level crossing.

== Platforms ==
| station side | ■ Amagi Line | for Amagi |
| opposote side | ■ Amagi Line | for Kiyama |

== Adjacent stations ==
| ← | Service | → |
Amagi Railway Amagi Line
| Yamaguma | - | Takata |

== History ==
Japanese Government Railways (JGR) opened the station was opened on 28 April 1939 as an intermediate station on its Amagi Line between Kiyama and Amagi. On 1 April 1986, control of the station was handed over to the Amagi Railway.

== Surrounding area ==
- Kirin Brewery Fukuoka Factory
- Tachiarai Peace Memorial Museum
- Japan National Route 500

== See also ==
- List of railway stations in Japan
