= Ogōri Station (disambiguation) =

Ogōri Station may refer to:

- Ogōri Station on the Amagi Railway Amagi Line in Ogōri, Fukuoka, Japan
- Nishitetsu Ogōri Station on the Nishitetsu Tenjin Ōmuta Line in Ogōri, Fukuoka, Japan
- Shin-Yamaguchi Station in Yamaguchi, Yamaguchi, Japan, formerly called Ogōri Station
