= Yamaguma Station =

Railway station in Chikuzen, Fukuoka Prefecture, Japan

Yamaguma Station 山隈駅
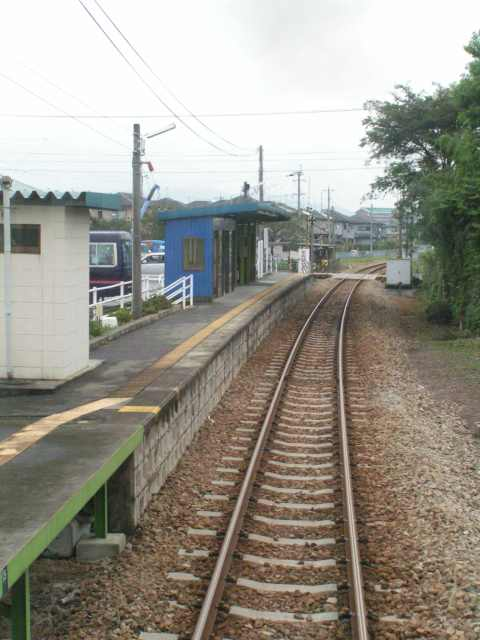
- Yamaguma Station in 2006

General information
- Location: Yamaguma, Chikuzen-machi, Asakura-gun, Fukuoka-ken 838-0823, Japan; Japan
- Coordinates: 33°24′50.8″N 130°36′36.82″E
- Operator: Amagi Railway
- Line: ■ Amagi Line
- Distance: 9.6 km from Kiyama
- Platforms: 1 side platform
- Tracks: 1

Construction
- Structure type: At grade
- Parking: Available
- Cycle facilities: Bike shed
- Accessible: Yes - ramp to platform

Other information
- Status: Unstaffed

History
- Opened: 1 November 1987

Passengers
- FY2018: 226
Location
- Location within Fukuoka Prefecture Location within Japan

Yamaguma Station (山隈駅, Yamaguma-eki) is a passenger railway station on the Amagi Line located in the town of Chikuzen, Fukuoka Prefecture, Japan. It is operated by the Amagi Railway, a third sector public-private partnership corporation.

== Lines ==
The station is served by the Amagi Railway Amagi Line and is located 9.6 km from the start of the line at Kiyama. All Amagi Line trains stop at the station.

== Layout ==
The station consists of a side platform serving a single bi-directional track. There is no station building but an enclosed shelter is provided on the platform for waiting passengers. A ramp leads up to the platform from the access road. A bike shed is provided across the road from the station entrance. Limited parking is available near the station entrance.

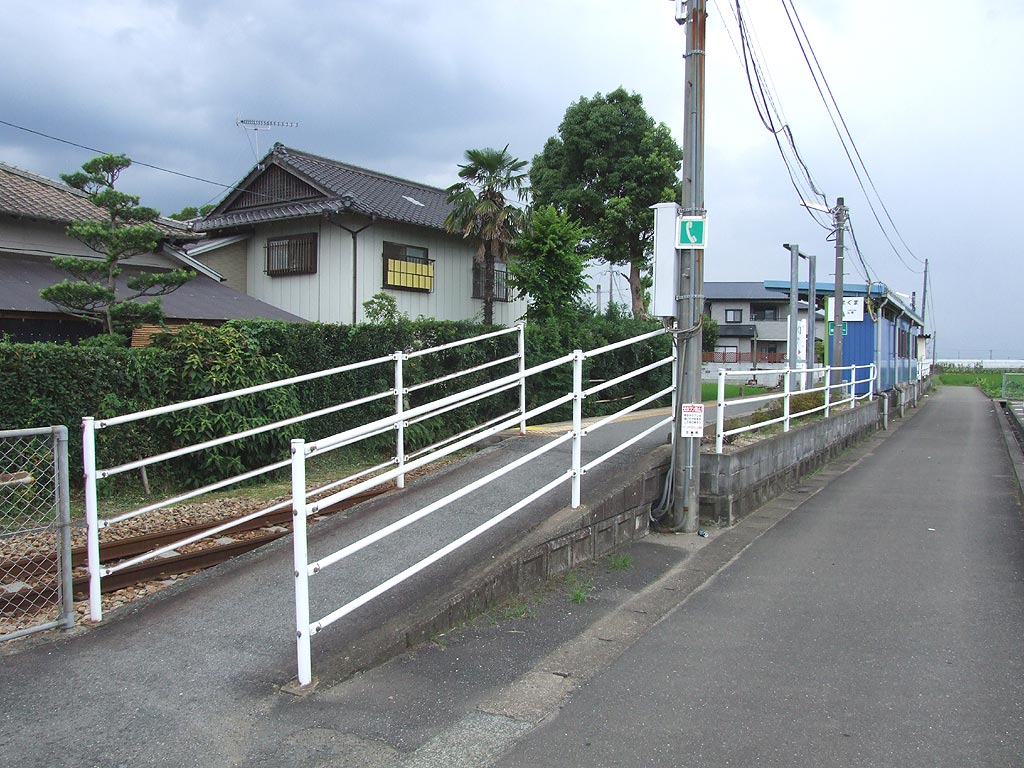
The entrance of Yamaguma Station.

=== Platforms ===
1	■ Amagi Line	for Kiyama and Amagi

== Adjacent stations ==
←	Service	→
Amagi Railway Amagi Line
Nishi-Tachiarai	Local	Tachiarai

== History ==
Amagi Railway opened the station on 1 November 1987 as an added station on the existing Amagi Line track.

== Surrounding area ==
- National Route 500 - runs parallel to the track in this vicinity.

== See also ==
- List of railway stations in Japan
