= Ogōri Station =

Railway station in Ogōri, Fukuoka Prefecture, Japan

Ogōri Station 小郡駅
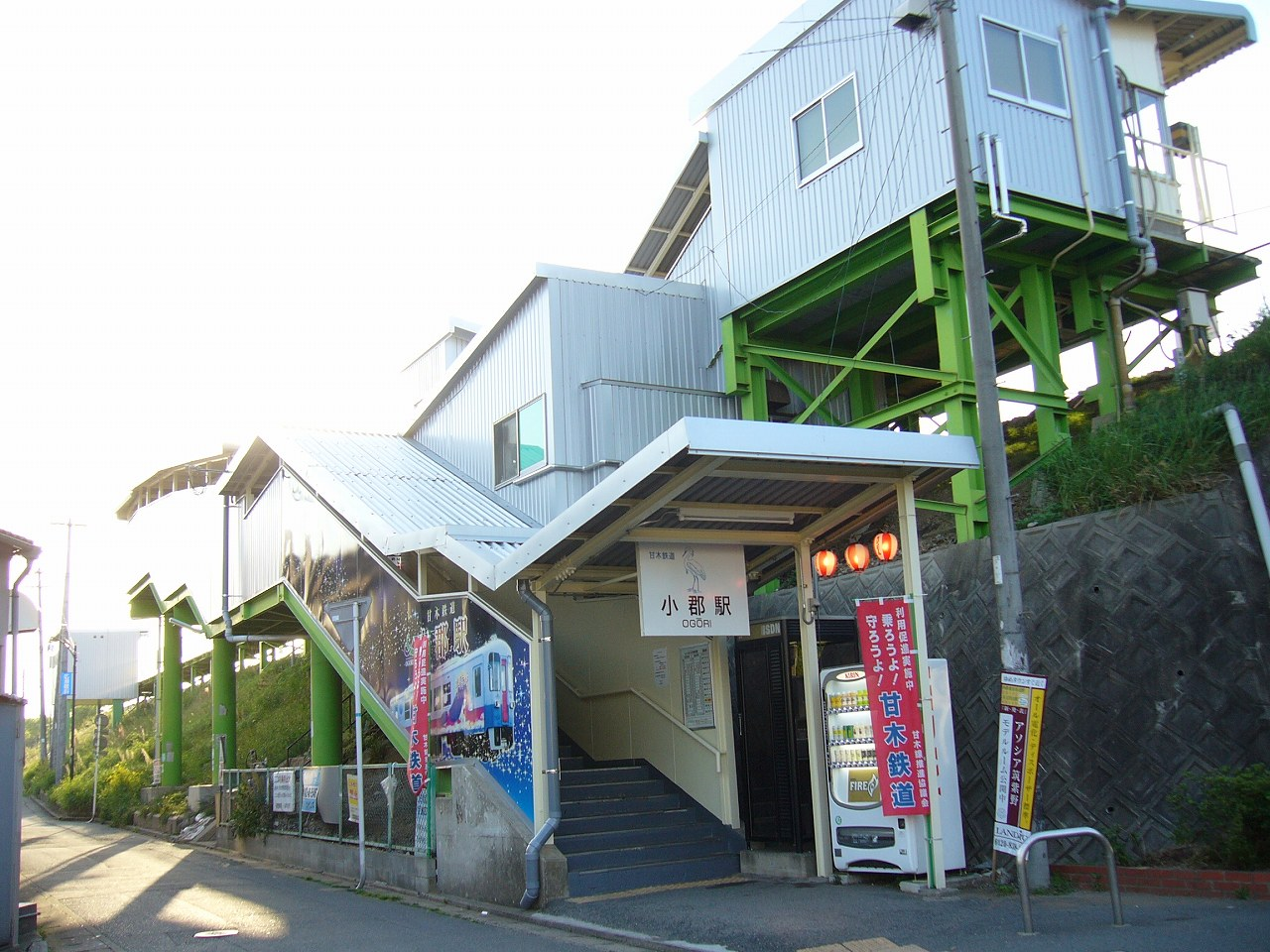
- Ogōri Station in 2007

General information
- Location: 1 Chome Gion, Ogori-shi, Fukuoka-ken 838-0141; Japan
- Coordinates: 33°23′53″N 130°33′13″E
- Operator: Amagi Railway
- Line: ■ Amagi Line
- Distance: 3.8 km from Kiyama
- Platforms: 1 side platform
- Tracks: 1
- Connections: Nishitetsu Tenjin Ōmuta Line

Construction
- Structure type: Embankment
- Accessible: No - steps to platform

Other information
- Status: Staffed Ticket window

History
- Opened: 28 April 1939
- Former names: Chikugo Ogōri (until 1 April 1986)

Passengers
- FY2018: 1021
Location
- Location within Fukuoka Prefecture Location within Japan

Ogōri Station (小郡駅, Ogōri-eki) is a passenger railway station located in the city of Ogōri, Fukuoka Prefecture, Japan. It is operated by the Amagi Railway, a third sector public-private partnership corporation.

== Lines ==
The station is served by the Amagi Railway Amagi Line and is located 3.8 km from the start of the line at Kiyama. All Amagi Line trains stop at the station.

== Layout ==
The station consists of a side platform serving a single track on an embankment. There is no station building but a shelter has been set up on the platform. From the main road, a roofed flight of steps leads up to the platform. A staffed ticket window is located at an intermediate landing halfway up the flight of steps.

=== Platforms ===
1	■ Amagi Line	for Kiyama, and Amagi

== Adjacent stations ==
←	Service	→
Amagi Railway Amagi Line
Tateno	-	Ōitai

== History ==
Japanese Government Railways (JGR) opened the station on 28 April 1939 with the name Chikugo-Ogōri Station (筑後小郡駅) as an intermediate station on its Amagi Line between Kiyama and Amagi. On 1 April 1986, control of the station was handed over to the Amagi Railway. The name of the station was changed to Ogōri and the location of the station was shifted 400 m further along the line from Kiyama.

== Connections ==
- Nishitetsu Ogōri Station on the Nishitetsu Tenjin Ōmuta Line is a short walk from the station across a road.

== Surrounding area ==
- Ogōri Elementary School
- Ogōri City Hall
- Ogōri Driving School
- Ogōriekimae Post Office
- Ogōri Swimming School

== See also ==
- List of railway stations in Japan
