= Tateno Station =

Tateno Station is the name of two train stations in Japan:

- Tateno Station (Kumamoto)
- Tateno Station (Saga)
