= Matsuzaki Station =

Matsuzaki Station is the name of two train stations in Japan:

- Matsuzaki Station (Fukuoka)
- Matsuzaki Station (Tottori)
