= Keyakidai Station =

Railway station in Kiyama, Saga Prefecture, Japan

JB 11 Keyakidai Station けやき台駅
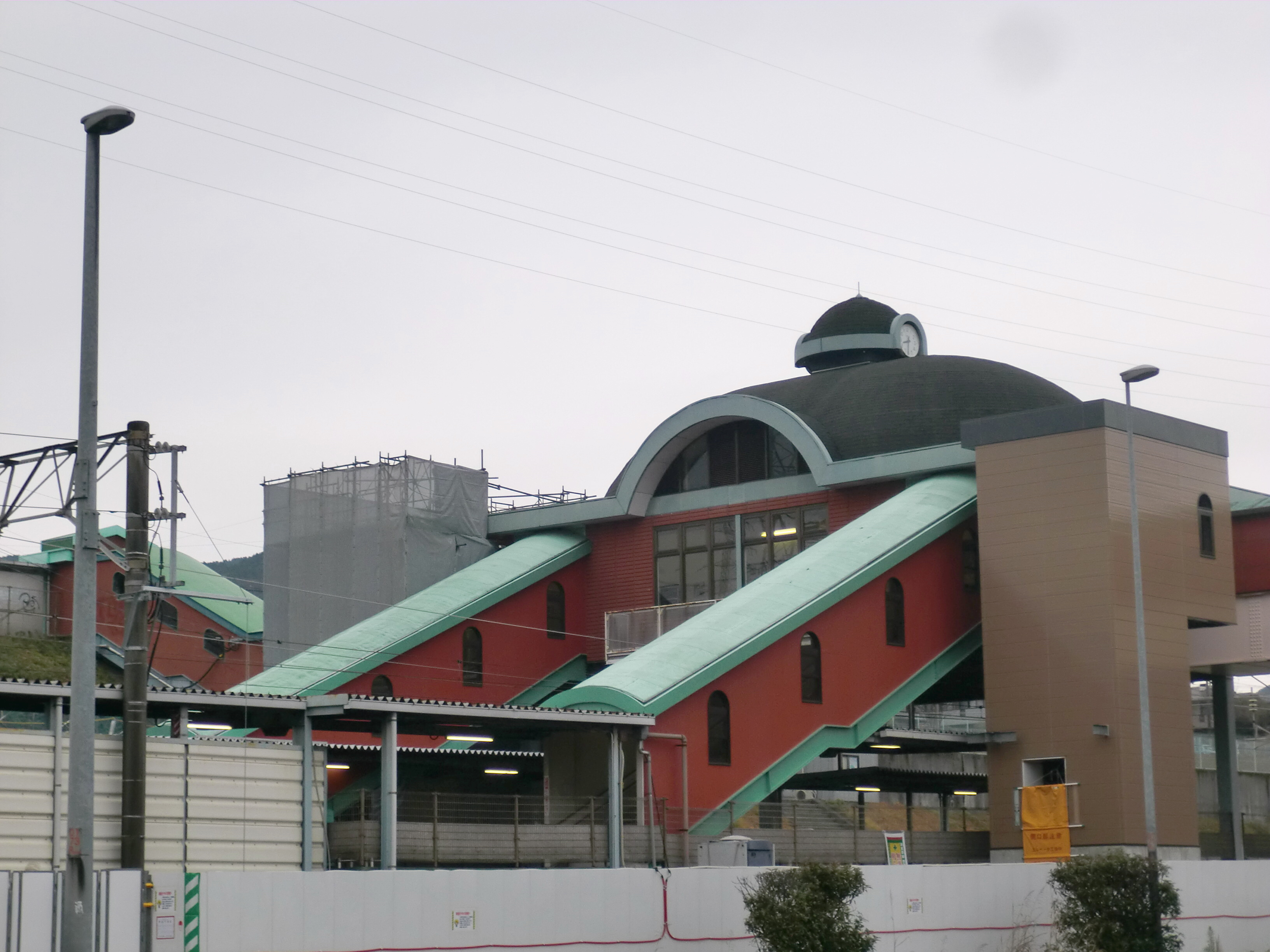
- The station exterior in January 2016

General information
- Location: Kokura, Kiyama-cho, Miyaki-gun, Saga-ken 841-0201; Japan
- Coordinates: 33°26′05″N 130°32′00″E
- Operator: JR Kyushu
- Line: JB Kagoshima Main Line
- Distance: 99.9 km from Mojikō
- Platforms: 2 side platforms
- Tracks: 2

Other information
- Status: staffed
- Website: Official website

History
- Opened: 10 March 1990

Passengers
- FY2020: 1002 daily
- Rank: 135th (among JR Kyushu stations)

Services
| Preceding station | JR Kyushu | Following station |
|---|---|---|
| Kiyama towards Kagoshima | Kagoshima Main Line | Haruda towards Mojikō |
Location
- Location within Saga Prefecture Location within Japan

Keyakidai Station (けやき台駅, Keyakidai-eki) is a passenger railway station located in the town of Kiyama, Saga Prefecture, Japan. It is operated by JR Kyushu.

== Lines ==
The station is served by the Kagoshima Main Line and is located 99.9 km from the starting point of the line at Mojikō.

== Layout ==
The station consists of two opposed side platforms serving two tracks, connected by an elevated station, with brick-like walls and dome roof, that was inspired by Tokyo Station. At the time of opening, the only exit was on the west side. However, in later years, neighboring Ogori City paid for the entire cost of a pedestrian bridge over Japan National Route 3 on the east side of the station, which is in neighbouring Fukuoka Prefecture. The station is staffed. The platforms were extended in March 2013 to enable 9-car trains to stop at the station from the start of the revised timetable on 16 March 2013.

=== Platforms ===
| 1 | ■ JA Kagoshima Main Line | for Orio, Kokura and Hakata |
| 2 | ■ JA Kagoshima Main Line | for Tosu and Kurume |

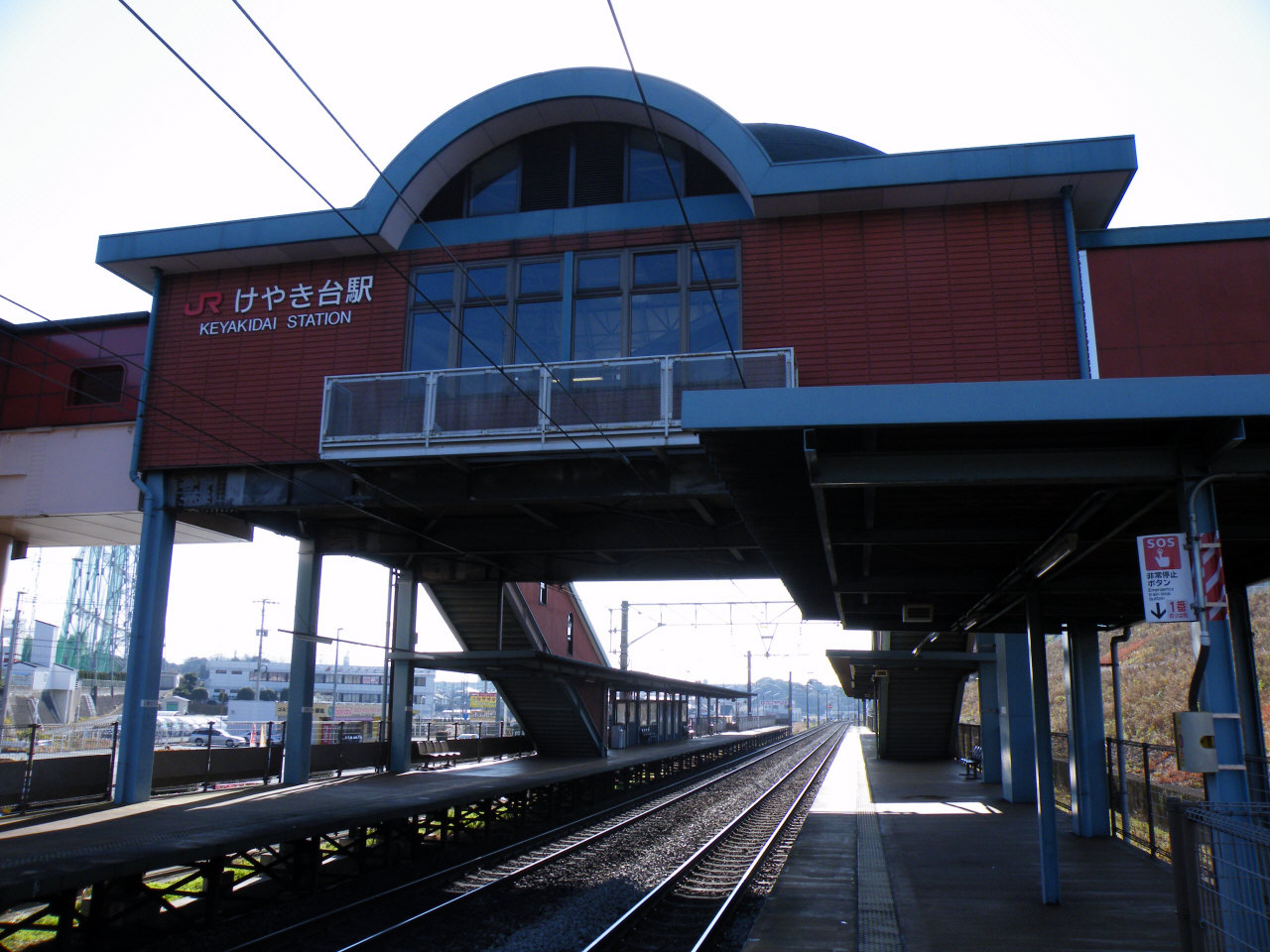
The platforms in January 2009

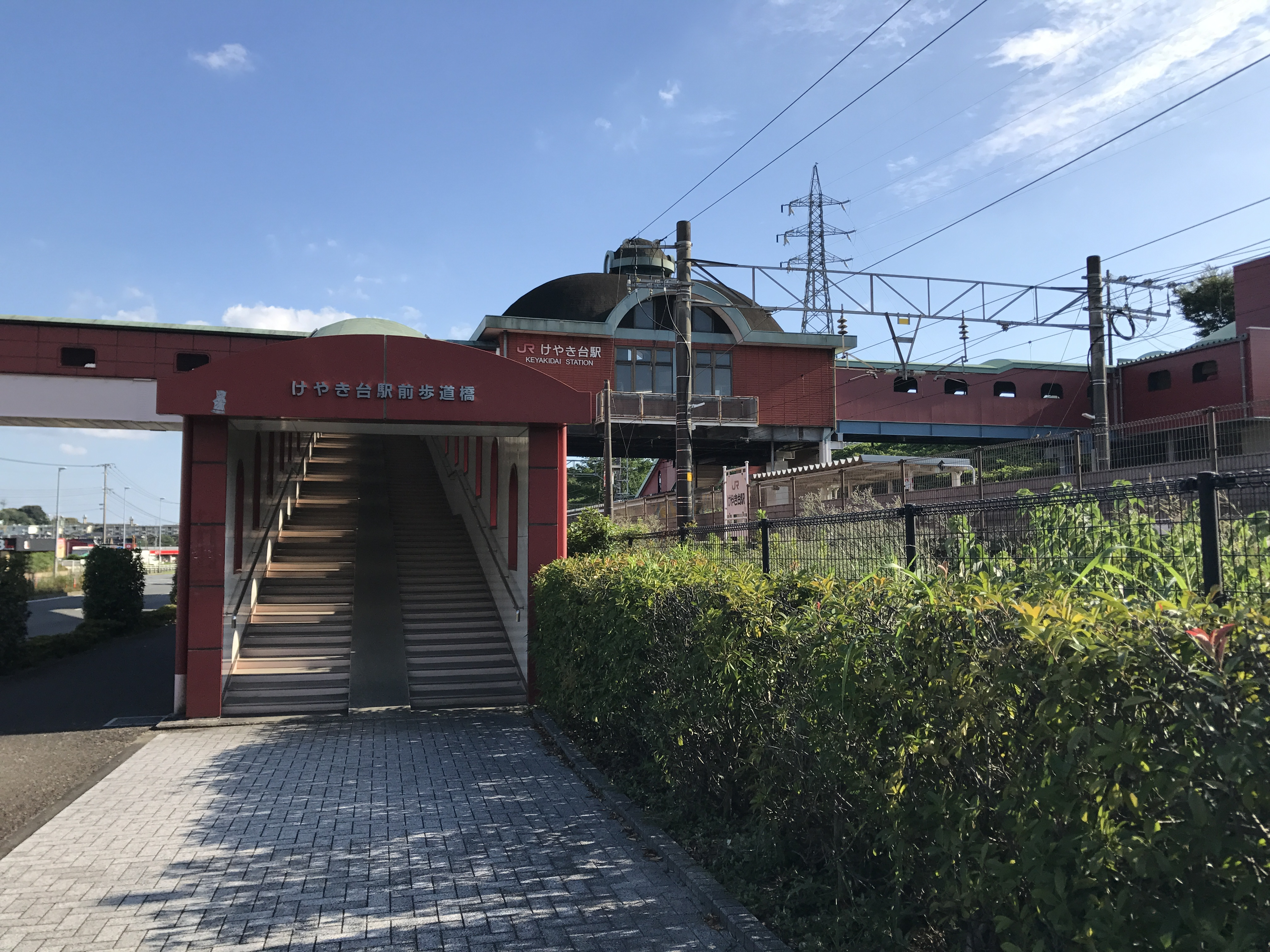
East Entrance

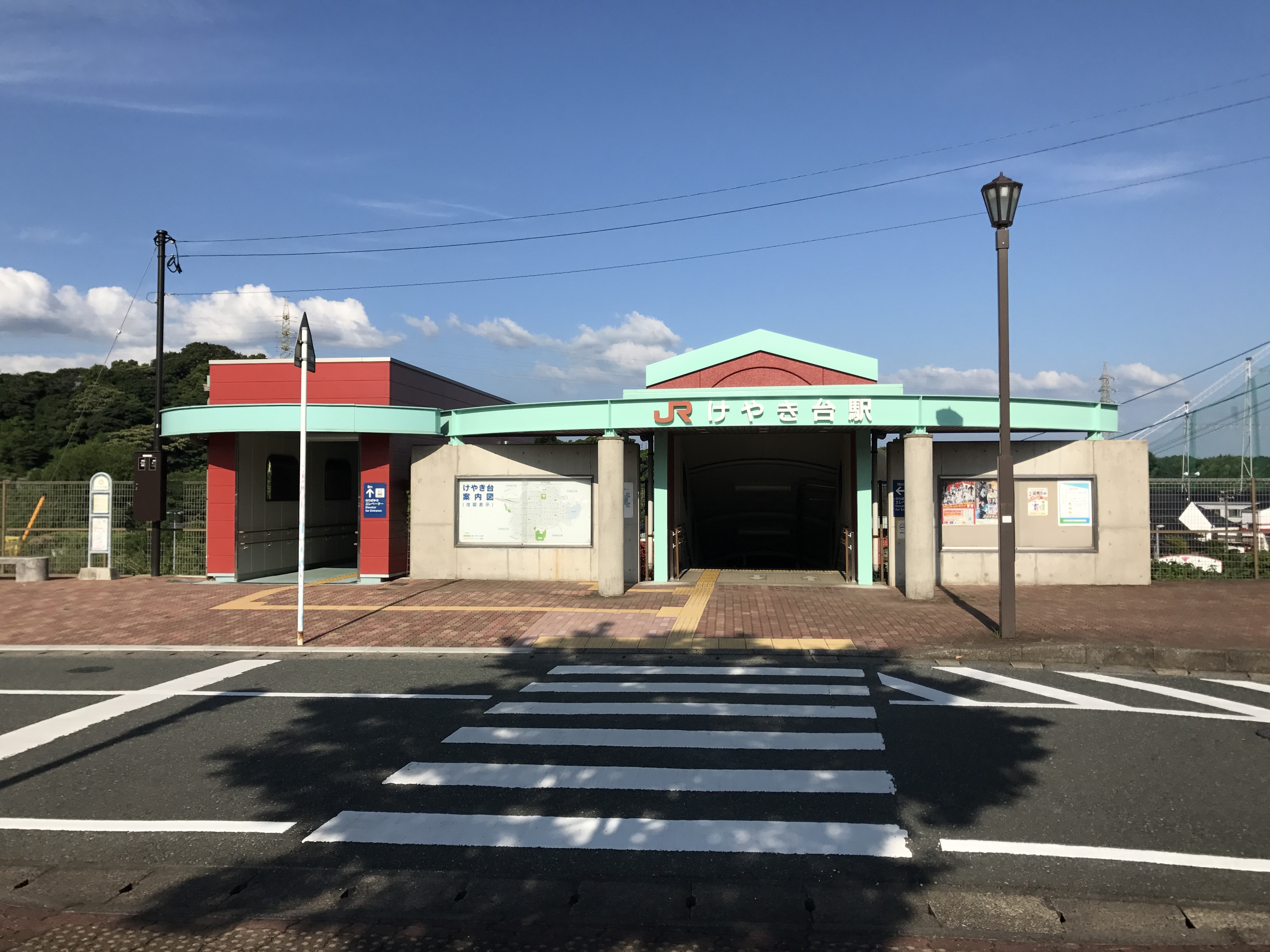
West Entrance

== History ==
The station was opened by JR Kyushu on 10 March 1990 as an added station on the existing Kagoshima Main Line track.

== Passenger statistics ==
In fiscal 2020, the station was used by an average of 1003 passengers daily (boarding passengers only), and it ranked 135th among the busiest stations of JR Kyushu.

== Surrounding area ==
- Kyushu Expressway Kiyama Parking Area
- Japan National Route 3
- Keyakidai New Town (Saga)
- Nozomigaoka New Town (Fukuoka)
- Suroy Mall Chikushino

== See also ==
- List of railway stations in Japan
