= Ogōri =

Ogōri 小郡市
- City
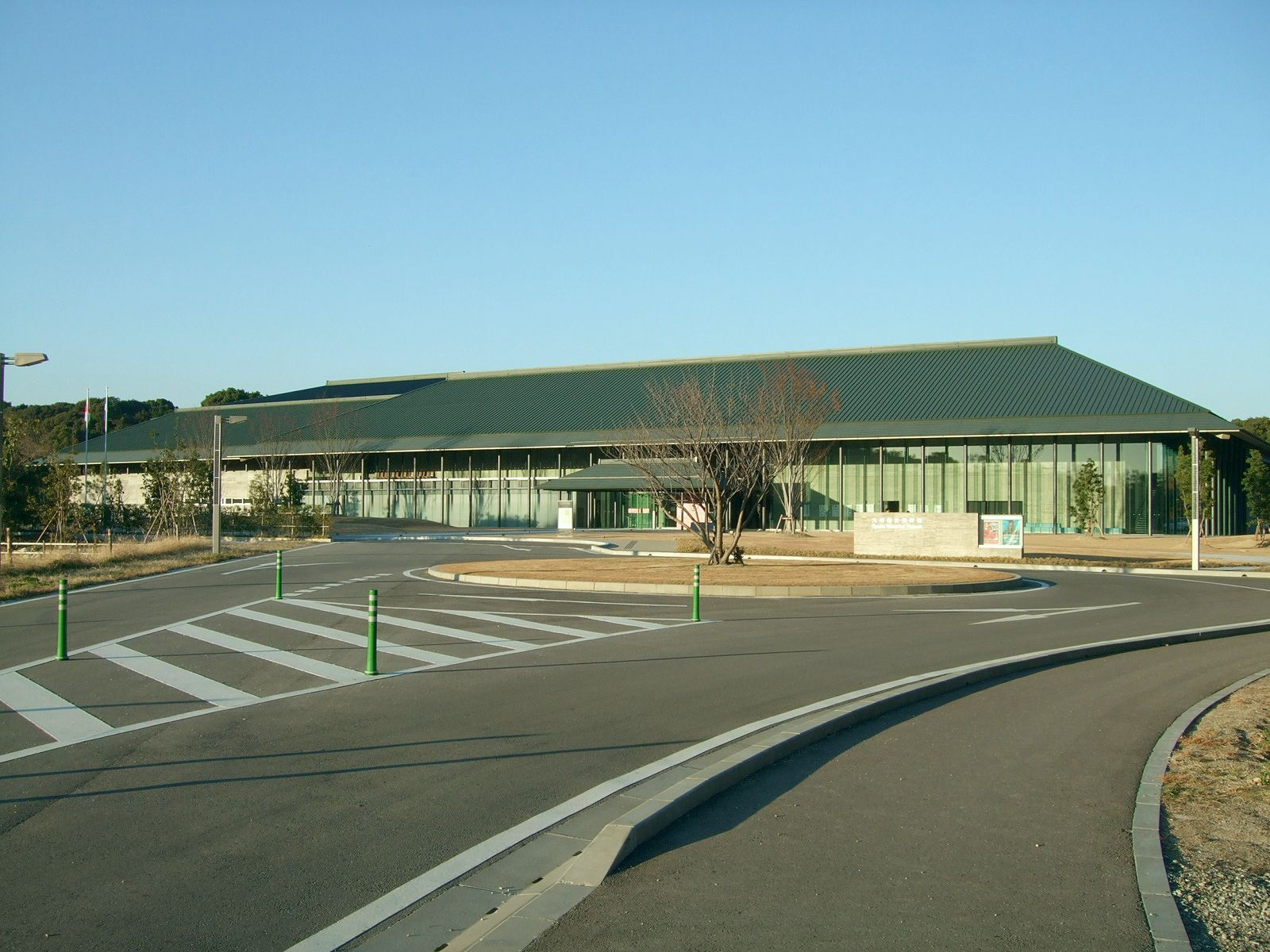
- Kyushu Historical Museum

- Flag Seal
- Location of Ogōri in Fukuoka Prefecture

- Location in Japan
- Coordinates: 33°23′47″N 130°33′20″E
- Country: Japan
- Region: Kyushu
- Prefecture: Fukuoka

Government
  - Mayor: Yoshimizu Kaji (since May 2017)

Area
  - Total: 45.51 km^{2} (17.57 sq mi)

Population (February 1, 2023)
  - Total: 59,590
  - Density: 1,309/km^{2} (3,391/sq mi)
- Time zone: UTC+09:00 (JST)
- City hall address: 255-1 Ogōri, Ogōri-shi, Fukuoka-ken 838-0198
- Website: Official website
- Symbols
- Bird: Heron
- Flower: Wisteria floribunda
- Tree: Cinnamomum camphora

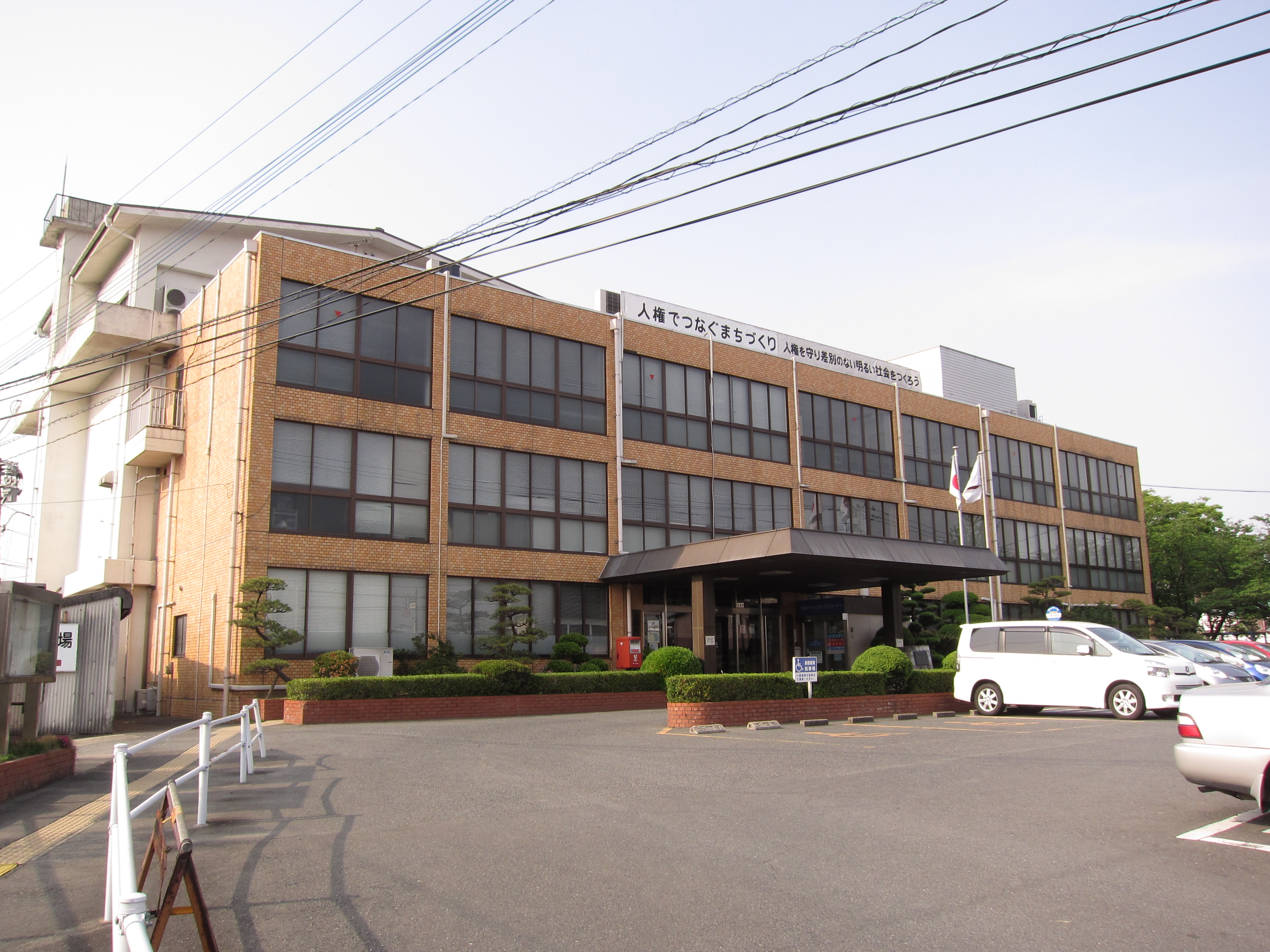
Ogōri City Hall

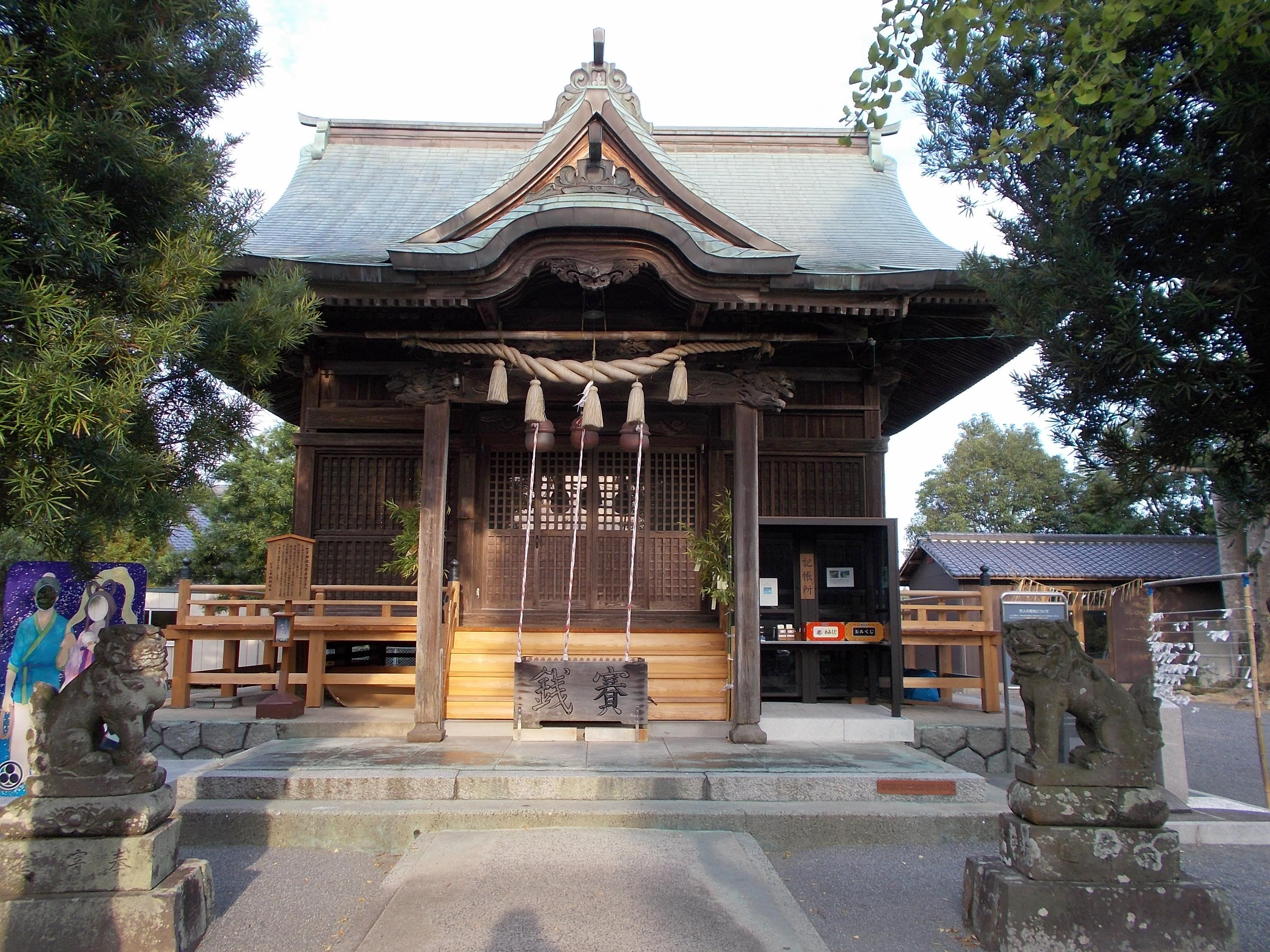
Tanabata Jinja

Ogōri (小郡市, Ogōri-shi; Japanese pronunciation: [ò̞.ɡó̞ò̞.ɾʲì, -ŋó̞ò̞.ɾʲì, -ɡó̞ó̞.ɾʲí.ɕì, -ŋó̞ó̞.ɾʲí-]) is a city located in Fukuoka Prefecture, Japan. As of 1 February 2024, the city had an estimated population of 59,590 in 25998 households, and a population density of 1309 persons per km². The total area of the city is 45.51 km^{2} (17.57 sq mi).

== Geography ==
Ogōri is located in southern Fukuoka Prefecture. The city is long and narrow from north-to-south. The Homan River, a tributary of the Chikugo River water system, runs through the city from north-to-south.

=== Neighboring municipalities ===
Fukuoka Prefecture

- Chikushino
- Chikuzen
- Kurume
- Tachiarai

Saga Prefecture

- Kiyama
- Tosu

=== Climate ===
Ogōri has a humid subtropical climate (Köppen Cfa) characterized by warm summers and cool winters with light to no snowfall. The average annual temperature in Ogōri is 15.2 °C. The average annual rainfall is 1766 mm with September as the wettest month.

=== Demographics ===
Per Japanese census data, the population of Ogōri is as shown below

Historical population
Year	Pop.	±%
1940	16,549	—
1950	22,216	+34.2%
1960	24,642	+10.9%
1970	30,469	+23.6%
1980	41,057	+34.8%
1990	47,116	+14.8%
2000	54,583	+15.8%
2010	58,499	+7.2%
2020	59,578	+1.8%

== History ==
The area of Ogōri was part of ancient Chikugo Province. During the Edo Period the area was under the control of Kurume Domain. After the Meiji restoration, the village of Ogōri was established on May 1, 1889 with the creation of the modern municipalities system. Ogōri was raised to town status on October 1, 1953. It annexed the neighboring villages of Mikuni, Tateishi, Mihara, and Ajisaka on March 31, 1955 and was raised to city status on April 1, 1972 .

== Government ==
Ogōri has a mayor-council form of government with a directly elected mayor and a unicameral city council of 18 members. Ogōri, together with the town of Tachiarai, contributes two members to the Fukuoka Prefectural Assembly. In terms of national politics, the city is part of the Fukuoka 6th district of the lower house of the Diet of Japan.

== Economy ==
Ogōri has a mixed economy centering on agriculture and light manufacturing. A large percentage of the working population commutes to nearby Kurume or to Fukuoka City for work.

== Education ==
Ogōri has eight public elementary schools and five public junior high schools operated by the city government and two public high schools operated by the Fukuoka Prefectural Board of Education. There is also one private junior high school. The prefecture also operates a special education school for the handicapped.

== Transportation ==
=== Railways ===
Nishitetsu Tenjin Ōmuta Line

- Tsuko - Mikunigaoka - Mitsusawa - Ōho - Nishitetsu Ogōri - Hatama - Ajisaka

■ Amagi Railway Amagi Line

- Ogōri - Ōitai - Matsuzaki - Imaguma

=== Highways ===
- Kyushu Expressway
- Ōita Expressway
- National Route 500

== Local attractions ==
- Kyushu Historical Museum
- Nyōirin Temple, also known as temple of the frog
- Ogōri Kanga ruins, National Historic Site
- Tanabata Shrine

== Notable residents of Ogōri ==
- Misa Eguchi - tennis player
- Kazuyuki Hoashi - baseball player
- Maki Itoh - professional wrestler, idol
- Masahiro Nakatani - baseball player
- Hikaru Naomoto - footballer
