= Matsuzaki Station (Fukuoka) =

Railway station in Ogōri, Fukuoka Prefecture, Japan

Matsuzaki Station 松崎駅
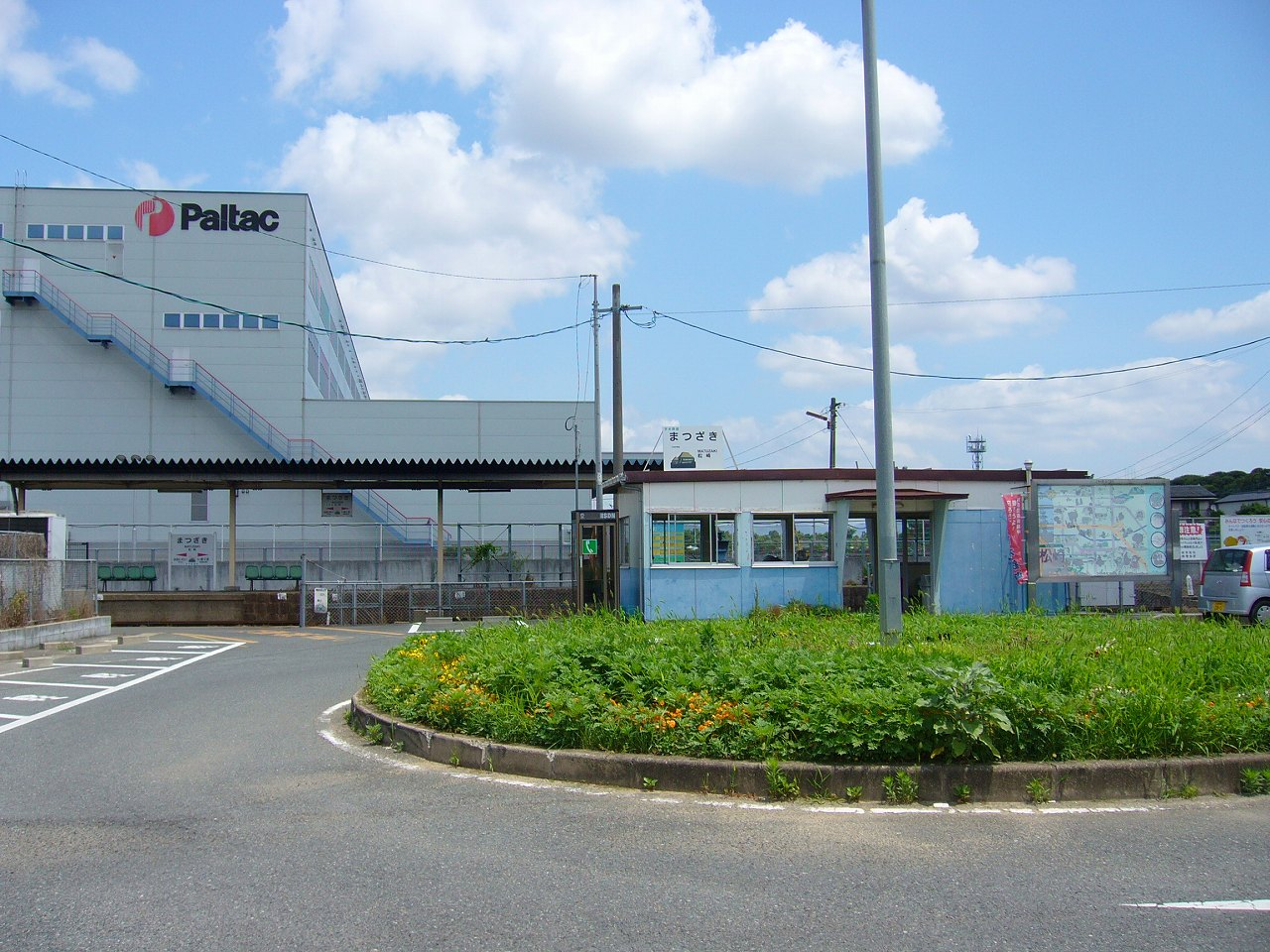
- Station platform

General information
- Location: Kamiiwata, Ogori-shi, Fukuoka-ken 838-0121; Japan
- Coordinates: 33°23′58.92″N 130°34′56.2″E
- Operator: Amagi Railway
- Line: ■ Amagi Line
- Distance: 6.4 km from Kiyama
- Platforms: 1 island platform

Construction
- Structure type: At grade
- Accessible: No - steps to platform

Other information
- Status: Unstaffed

History
- Opened: 28 April 1939
- Former names: Chikugo Matsuzaki (until 1 April 1986)

Passengers
- FY2018: 330
Location
- Location within Fukuoka Prefecture Location within Japan

Matsuzaki Station (松崎駅, Matsuzaki-eki) is a passenger railway station located in the city of Ogōri, Fukuoka Prefecture, Japan. It is operated by the Amagi Railway, a third sector public-private partnership corporation.

== Lines ==
The station is served by the Amagi Railway Amagi Line and is located 6.4 km from the start of the line at Kiyama. All Amagi Line trains stop at the station.

== Layout ==
The station consists of an island platform serving two tracks. The station building located by the side of the tracks is a small prefabricated structure which is unstaffed and serves only as a waiting room. Access to the island platform is by means of a level crossing with steps at both ends.

=== Platforms ===
| Track 1 | ■ Amagi Line | for Amagi |
| Track 2 | ■ Amagi Line | for Kiyama |

== Adjacent stations ==
| ← | Service | → |
Amagi Railway Amagi Line
| Ōitai | Local | Imaguma |

== History ==
Japanese Government Railways (JGR) opened the station on 28 April 1939 with the name Chikugo Matsuzaki (筑後松崎駅) as an intermediate station on its Amagi Line between Kiyama and Amagi. On 1 April 1986, control of the station was handed over to the Amagi Railway. The name of the station was changed to Matsuzaki on the same day.

== Surrounding area ==
- Matsuzaki Post Office
- Mii High School
- Oita Expressway
- Japan National Route 500

== See also ==
- List of railway stations in Japan
