= Tanabata Shrine =

Shinto shrine in Fukuoka Prefecture, Japan

Tanabata-jinja 七夕神社
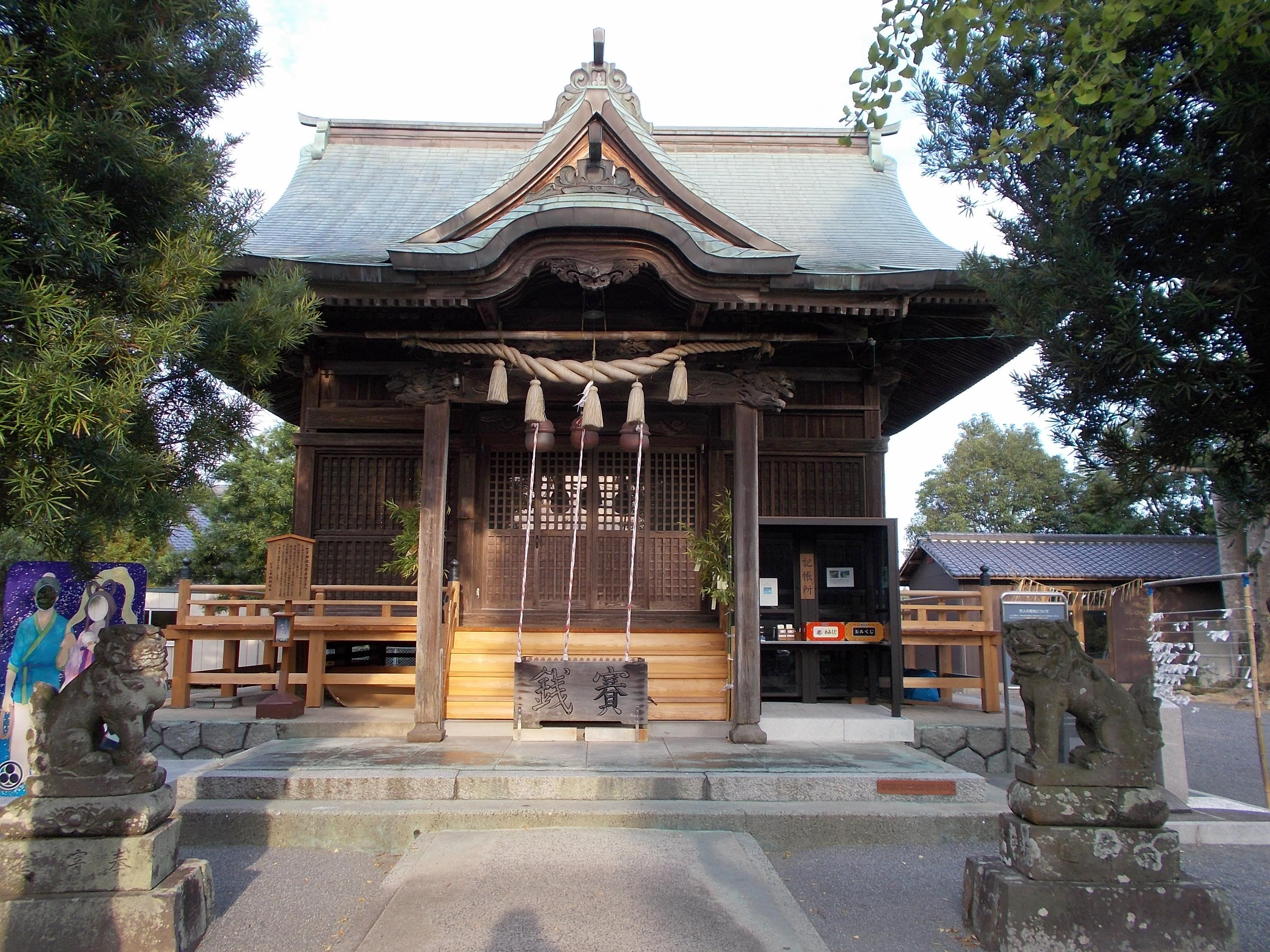
- The honden, or main shrine

- Location within Japan

Religion
- Affiliation: Shinto
- Deity: Orihime; Himekoso-no-Kami

Location
- Location: 1-1, Ōzaki, Ogōri; Fukuoka 838-0127
- Interactive map of Tanabata-jinja 七夕神社
- Coordinates: 33°23′22.09″N 130°33′47.52″E

Architecture
- Established: Unknown

Tanabata-jinja (七夕神社), also known as Himekoso-jinja (媛社神社), is a Shinto shrine located in Ogōri, Fukuoka prefecture, Japan. It is dedicated to Orihime, the Japanese name of the Weaver Girl from the Chinese folk tale The Weaver Girl and the Cowherd. The weaver is celebrated in Tanabata, a Japanese festival.

== History ==
According to the Hizen-Fudoki, an ancient record of the Hizen Province, this shrine was extant in 730. The original object of worship at the shrine was a river, Yamaji-gawa, on the south of the shrine. In Engishiki, a formal record on shrines written 1000 years ago, this area was developed by the textile industry. The villagers believe the weaving goddess known as Tanabata-tsume (棚機津女) from ancient times, and the story of the Cowherd and the Weaver Girl from China was assimilated, it is now known as the god of textiles.

== Festivals ==
Tanabata Grand festival, the annual summer festival held August 6–8 every year. On the evening of August 6 children bring the mikoshi from the shrine, carry it around the neighborhoods that worship at the shrine. At 5 o'clock on the following day morning, the lion dance is performed as a prayer dedicated to the shrine. And later in the morning, the lion dancer and children pulling a float visit neighbors. In the evening, many open-air stalls line the path leading to the shrine, and wishes written on strips of paper sent from people throughout Japan decorate every available space.

== Gallery ==
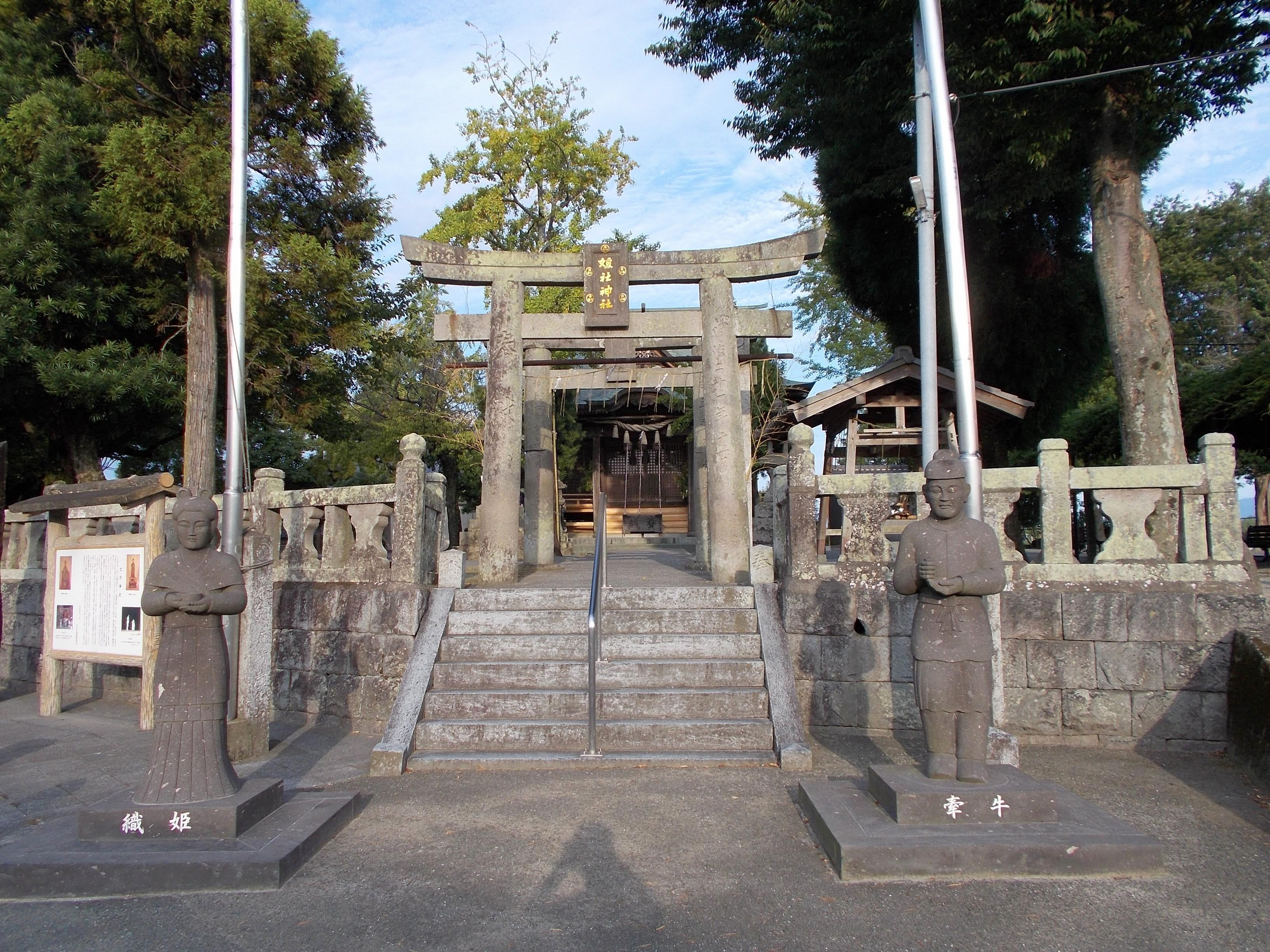
Torii at Tanabata Shrine entrance.
