= Tateno Station (Saga) =

Railway station in Kiyama, Saga Prefecture, Japan

Tateno Station 立野駅
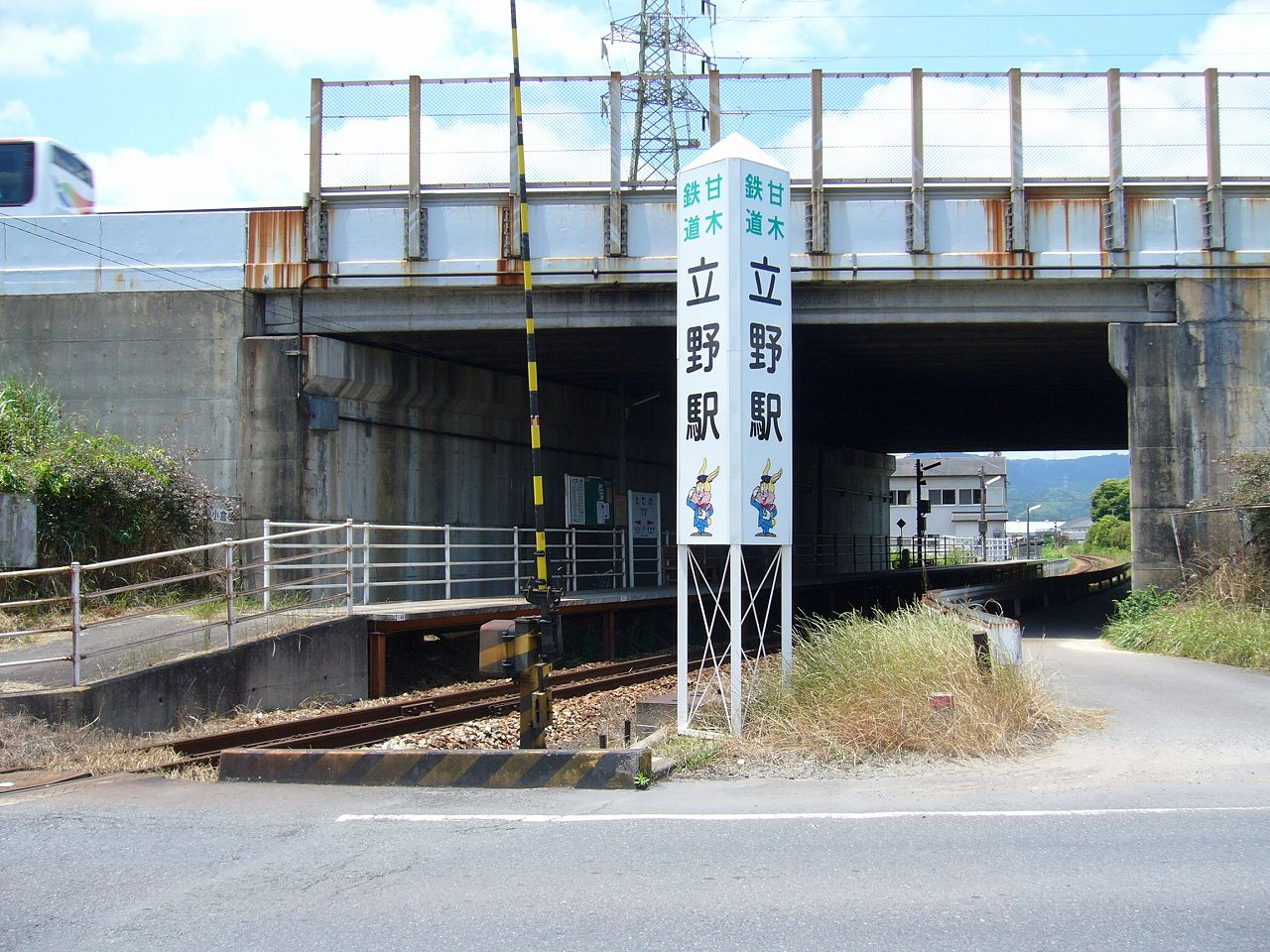
- Tateno Station in 2007

General information
- Location: Nagano, Kiyama, Miyaki-shi, Saga-ken 841-0202; Japan
- Coordinates: 33°24′44.8″N 130°32′22.24″E
- Operator: Amagi Railway
- Line: ■ Amagi Line
- Distance: 1.3 km from Kiyama
- Platforms: 1 side platform
- Tracks: 1

Construction
- Structure type: At grade
- Accessible: Yes - ramp to platform

Other information
- Status: Unstaffed

History
- Opened: 1 November 1987

Passengers
- FY2018: 78
Location
- Location within Saga Prefecture Location within Japan

Tateno Station (立野駅, Tateno-eki) is a passenger railway station located in the town of Kiyama, Saga, Japan. It is operated by the Amagi Railway, a third sector public-private partnership corporation.

== Lines ==
The station is served by the Amagi Railway Amagi Line and is located 1.3 km from the start of the line at Kiyama. All Amagi Line trains stop at the station.

== Layout ==
The station consists of a side platform serving a single track at grade. There is no station building but the platform is sheltered as it is located under an expressway overpass. Access to the platform is by means of a flight of steps or a ramp.

== Platforms ==
1	■ Amagi Line	for Kiyama, and Amagi

== Adjacent stations ==
←	Service	→
Amagi Railway Amagi Line
Kiyama	Local	Ogōri

== History ==
Amagi Railway opened the station on 1 November 1987 as an added station on the existing Amagi Line track.

== Passenger statistics ==
In fiscal 2018, the station was used by an average of 78 passengers daily.

== Surrounding area ==
- Coca-Cola West Japan
- Toyo Seikan

== See also ==
- List of railway stations in Japan
