= Amagi Railway Amagi Line =

Railway line in Japan

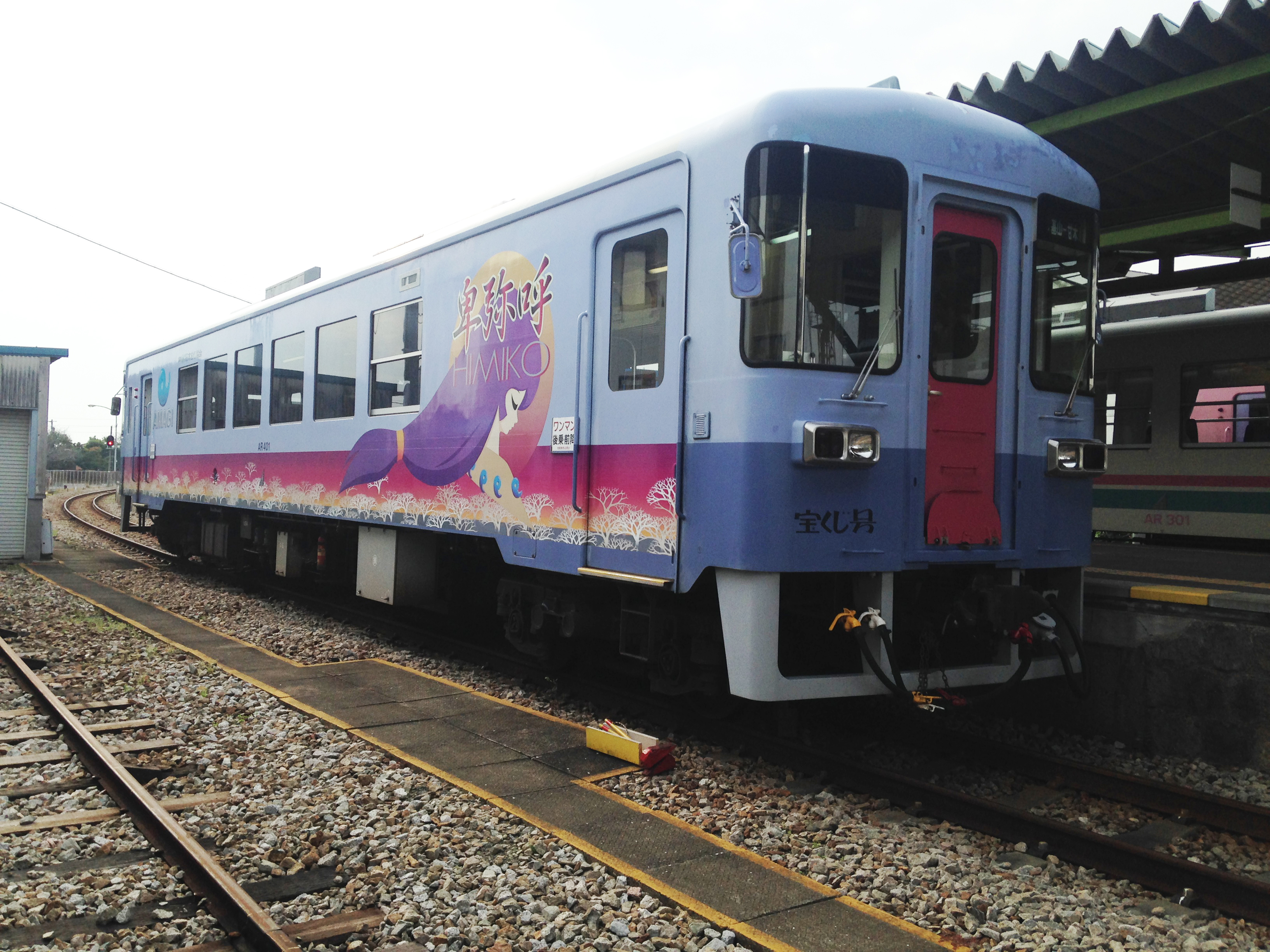
- AR401 DMU, nicknamed "Himiko", at Kiyama Station

Overview
- Native name: 甘木鉄道甘木線
- Owner: Amagi Railway
- Locale: Saga Prefecture and Fukuoka Prefecture
- Termini: Kiyama Station; Amagi Station
- Stations: 11

History
- Opened: April 28, 1939; 86 years ago

Technical
- Line length: 13.7 km (8.5 mi)
- Track gauge: 1,067 mm (3 ft 6 in)

The Amagi Line (甘木線, Amagi-sen) is a Japanese railway line connecting Kiyama Station (on the Kagoshima Main Line), Kiyama and Amagi Station, Asakura. This is the only railway operated by the third-sector railway company Amagi Railway (甘木鉄道, Amagi Tetsudō). The company, and sometimes the line, are also called Amatetsu (甘鉄).

== History ==
The line was opened on April 28, 1939 by the Japanese National Railways (JNR) as the Amagi Line, in order to supply military equipment to Tachiarai Airfield. In 1981, the line was named a specified local line and considered for closure. Freight services ceased in 1984.

On April 5, 1985, it was agreed that the line would be transferred to a newly created third sector railway company. Amagi Railway was thus created and inherited the former JNR line on April 1, 1986. While the conversion of the line into a bus route was unopposed by both Saga and Fukuoka Prefectures due to the Nishitetsu Amagi Line's existence, the municipalities Amagi and Miwa requested the line be kept in operation. After the transferring of the line, Ogōri Station was relocated by 400 meters to allow easier connection to the Nishitetsu Ogōri Station. The number of services were increased from seven return trips a day in 1982 to 42 in 2023 on weekdays. The AR400 series in use on the line is planned to be replaced by the ARe500 series starting from 2025.

=== Stations ===
Station name	Japanese	Distance (between station)	Total distance	Transfers	Location	
Kiyama Station	基山駅	-	0.0	Kagoshima Main Line	Saga Prefecture	Kiyama
Tateno Station	立野駅	1.3	1.3		Saga Prefecture	Kiyama
Ogōri Station	小郡駅	2.5	3.8	Nishitetsu Tenjin Ōmuta Line (Nishitetsu Ogōri Station)	Fukuoka Prefecture	Ogōri
Ōitai Station	大板井駅	0.7	4.5		Fukuoka Prefecture	Ogōri
Matsuzaki Station	松崎駅	1.9	6.4		Fukuoka Prefecture	Ogōri
Imaguma Station	今隈駅	1.3	7.7		Fukuoka Prefecture	Ogōri
Nishi-Tachiarai Station	西太刀洗駅	0.7	8.4		Fukuoka Prefecture	Tachiarai
Yamaguma Station	山隈駅	1.2	9.6		Fukuoka Prefecture	Chikuzen
Tachiarai Station	太刀洗駅	0.8	10.4		Fukuoka Prefecture	Chikuzen
Takata Station	高田駅	1.4	11.8		Fukuoka Prefecture	Chikuzen
Amagi Station	甘木駅	1.9	13.7	Nishitetsu Amagi Line	Fukuoka Prefecture	Asakura

== See also ==
- List of railway companies in Japan
- List of railway lines in Japan
