= Ōita Expressway =

Expressway in Japan

Ōita Expressway
- 大分自動車道

Route information
- Length: 104.7 km (65.1 mi)
- Existed: 1987–present

Major junctions
- From: Tosu Junction in Tosu; Kyushu Expressway; Nagasaki Expressway
- To: Hiji Junction in Hiji; Higashikyushu Expressway

Location
- Country: Japan
- Major cities: Asakura, Hita, Yufu

Highway system
- National highways of Japan; Expressways of Japan

Ōita Expressway (大分自動車道, Ōita Jidōsha-dō) is a Japanese expressway in Kyushu that travels from Tosu to Hiji, where it connects to the Higashikyushu Expressway. It runs through the southern half of Fukuoka Prefecture, and the northern half of Ōita Prefecture. The total length of Ōita Expressway is 104.7 kilometres (65.1 mi).

== History ==
- February 5, 1987, the Tosu Junction to Asakura Interchange was opened.
- July 20, 1989, a section from Yufuin to Beppu Interchanges was opened to traffic.
- March 10, 1990, a section from Asakura to Hita Interchanges was opened to traffic.
- December 3, 1992, a section from Beppu to Ōita Interchanges was opened to traffic.
- December 15, 1994, a section from Hiji Junction to Hayami Interchange was opened to traffic.
- March 10, 1995, a section from Hita to Kusu Interchanges was opened to traffic.
- March 28, 1996, a section from Kusu to Yufuin Interchanges was opened to traffic.
- November 26, 1996, a section from Ōita to Ōita Mera Interchanges was opened to traffic which made the Ōita Expressway from Tosu to Ōita fully accessible with no gaps.
- November 11, 1998, a section from Haki to Hita Interchanges which made Ōita Expressway with four lanes.
- November 27, 1999, the Ōita Mera Interchange to the east was opened to traffic.
- March 21, 2000, a section from Hita to Kusu Interchanges which made with four lanes.
- March 30, 2002, a section from Hayami Interchange to the east was opened with other freeway.
- May 25, 2002, a section from Yufuin Interchange to Hiji Junction which made with four lanes.
- August 30, 2004, a section from Mizuwake Parking Area to Yufuin Interchange which made with four lanes.
- March 19, 2005, a section from Kusu Interchange to Mizuwake Parking Area which made Ōita Expressway from Tosu to Ōita with four lanes now being connected with no gaps.
- August 11, 2008, the Ōita Mitsuyoshi Interchange was fully accessible.
- August 5, 2018, a section from Hiji Junction to Ōita Mera Interchange is incorporated as part of the Higashikyushu Expressway.

== Interchanges ==
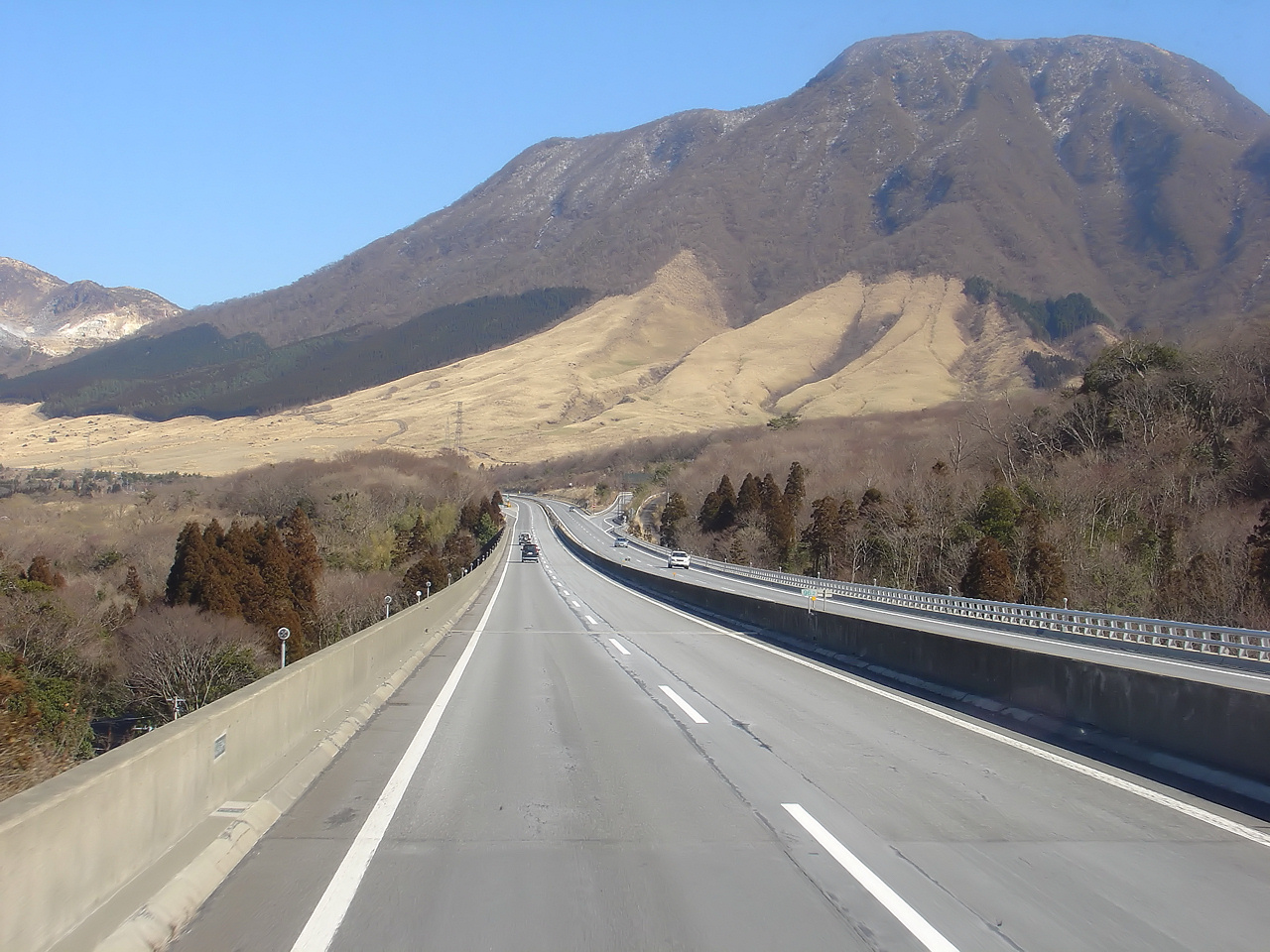
Yufu, Ōita, Japan

- IC - interchange, JCT - junction, SA - service area, PA - parking area, BS - bus stop, TN - tunnel, BR - bridge, TB - toll gate
- Bus stops labeled "○" are currently in use; those marked "◆" are closed.

No.	Name	Connections	Dist. from Origin	Bus stop	Notes	Location	
(9)	Tosu JCT	Kyushu Expressway; Nagasaki Expressway	0.0			Tosu	Saga
BS	Ōitai BS		2.0	○		Ogōri	Fukuoka
PA	Inoue PA		3.3		Only accessible for Tosu	Ogōri	Fukuoka
1	Chikugo Ogōri IC	Pref. Route 53 (Kurume Chikushino Route)	4.9			Ogōri	Fukuoka
PA	Tachiarai PA		7.4	○	Only accessible for Oita	Tachiarai	Fukuoka
2	Amagi IC	Pref. Route 8 (Mada Tonta Route)	10.9	○		Asakura	Fukuoka
3	Asakura IC	Pref. Route 80 (Amagi Asakura Tanushimaru Route)	19.0	○		Asakura	Fukuoka
SA	Yamada SA		22.0			Asakura	Fukuoka
4	Haki IC	National Route 386	27.5			Asakura	Fukuoka
PA	Hagio PA		38.9			Hita	Ōita
5	Hita IC	National Route 212; Nakatsu Hita Road (planned)	41.5			Hita	Ōita
BS	Hita BS		42.9	○		Hita	Ōita
6	Amagase Takatsuka IC	Pref. Route 54 (Kusu Amagase Route)	54.9	○		Kusu	Ōita
TN	Daitarō TN		-		West-bound 2,311 m East-bound 2,299 m	Kusu	Ōita
SA	Kusu SA		61.4			Kusu	Ōita
7	Kusu IC	National Route 387	66.2	○		Kusu	Ōita
8	Kokonoe IC	Pref. Route 40 (Handa-Kogen Nakamura Route)	75.7	○		Kokonoe	Ōita
PA	Mizuwake PA		79.8			Kokonoe	Ōita
9	Yufuin IC	National Route 210	88.0	○		Yufu	Ōita
9-1	Yufu PA/SIA	Pref. Route 616 (Tsukahara Amama Route)	97.0	◆	Only Bus stop closed	Yufu	Ōita
BS	Amama BS		102.1	◆		Beppu	Ōita
10	Hiji JCT	Higashikyushu Expressway	104.7			Hiji	Ōita

== Lanes ==
- 4-lane
