= Nishitetsu Ogōri Station =

Railway station in Ogōri, Fukuoka Prefecture, Japan

Nishitetsu Ogōri Station 西鉄小郡駅
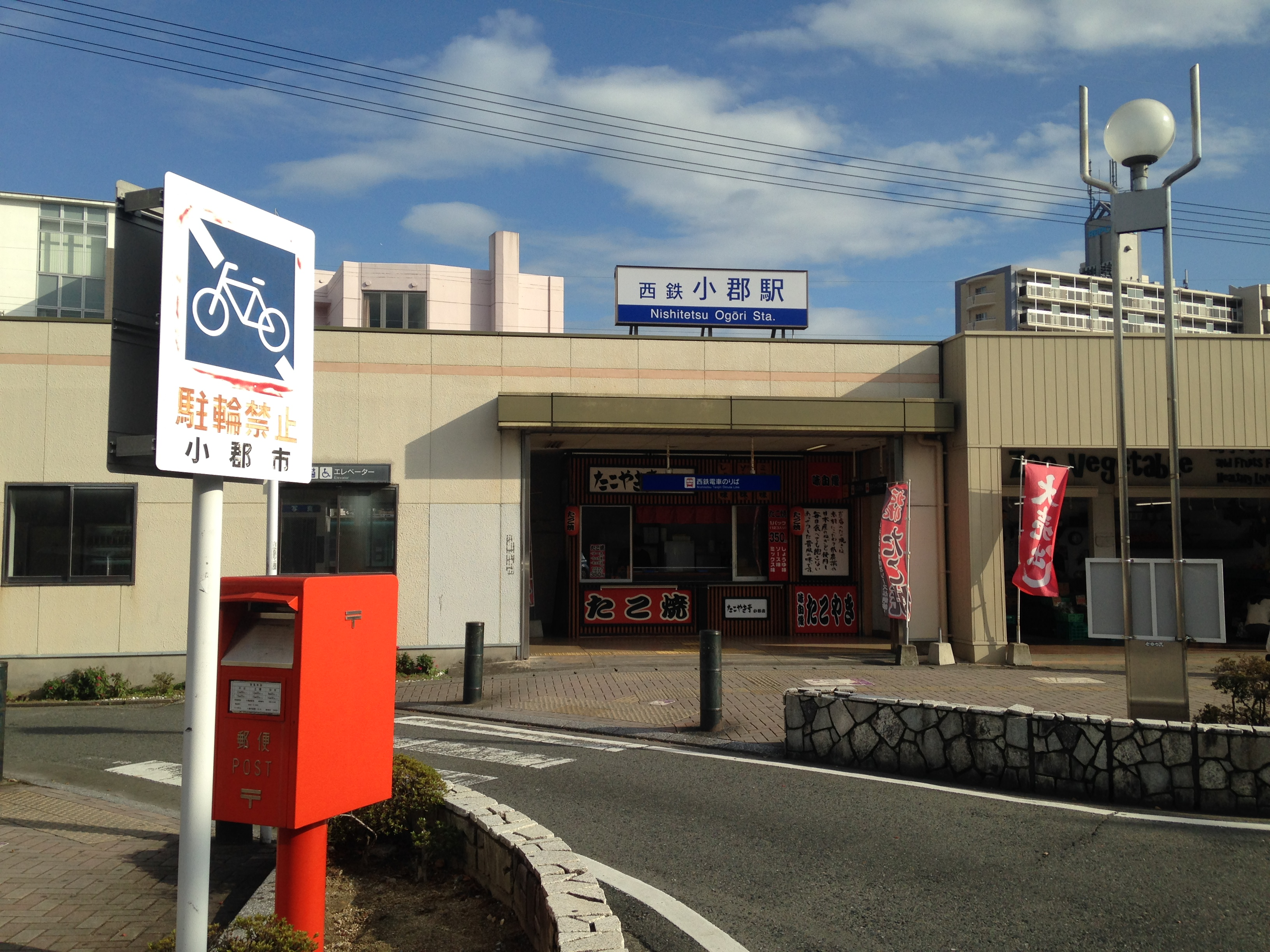
- Nishitetsu Ogōri Station

General information
- Location: Gion 1-chome, Ogōri-shi, Fukuoka-ken 838-0141; Japan
- Coordinates: 33°23′47″N 130°33′12″E
- Line: ■ Tenjin Ōmuta Line
- Distance: 28.7 km from Nishitetsu Fukuoka (Tenjin)
- Platforms: 2 island platforms
- Connections

Construction
- Structure type: Elevated

Other information
- Status: Staffed
- Station code: T22
- Website: Official website

History
- Opened: 12 April 1924
- Former names: Ogōri (to 1939); Kyuden-Ogōri (to 1942)

Passengers
- FY2022: 9236

Services
| Preceding station | Nishitetsu | Following station |
|---|---|---|
| Ōho towards Nishitetsu Fukuoka (Tenjin) | Tenjin Ōmuta Line Local | Hatama towards Ōmuta |
| Chikushi towards Nishitetsu Fukuoka (Tenjin) | Tenjin Ōmuta Line Express | Miyanojin towards Ōmuta |
Location
- Location within Fukuoka Prefecture Location within Japan

Nishitetsu Ogōri Station (西鉄小郡駅, Nishitetsu Ogōri-eki) is a passenger railway station located in the city of Ogōri, Fukuoka, Japan. It is operated by the private transportation company Nishi-Nippon Railroad (NNR), and has station number T22.

== Lines ==
The station is served by the Nishitetsu Tenjin Ōmuta Line and is 28.7 kilometers from the starting point of the line at Nishitetsu Fukuoka (Tenjin) Station.

== Station layout ==
The station consists of a two elevated island platforms with the station building underneath. The station is staffed.

== Platforms ==
| 1 | ■ Tenjin Ōmuta Line | for Kurume, Yanagawa and Ōmuta |
| 2 | ■ Tenjin Ōmuta Line | for Kurume, Yanagawa and Ōmuta |
| 3 | ■ Tenjin Ōmuta Line | for Futsukaichi and Fukuoka |
| 4 | ■ Tenjin Ōmuta Line | for Futsukaichi and Fukuoka |

== History ==
The station opened on 12 April 1924 as Ogōri Station (小郡駅) on the Kyushu Railway. On 1 July 1939, the station name was changed to Kyutetsu Ogōri Station (九鉄小郡駅)The company merged with the Kyushu Electric Tramway on 19 September 1942. The company changed its name to Nishi-Nippon Railway three days later, on 22 September 1942 and the station name was changed to its present name.

== Passenger statistics ==
In fiscal 2022, the station was used by 9236 passengers daily.

== Surrounding area ==
- Ogori City Hall
- Ogori City Gymnasium
- Ogori City Cultural Hall
- Ogori Municipal Ogori Elementary School

== See also ==
- List of railway stations in Japan
