= Japan National Route 500 =

Road in Japan

National Route 500
- 国道500号
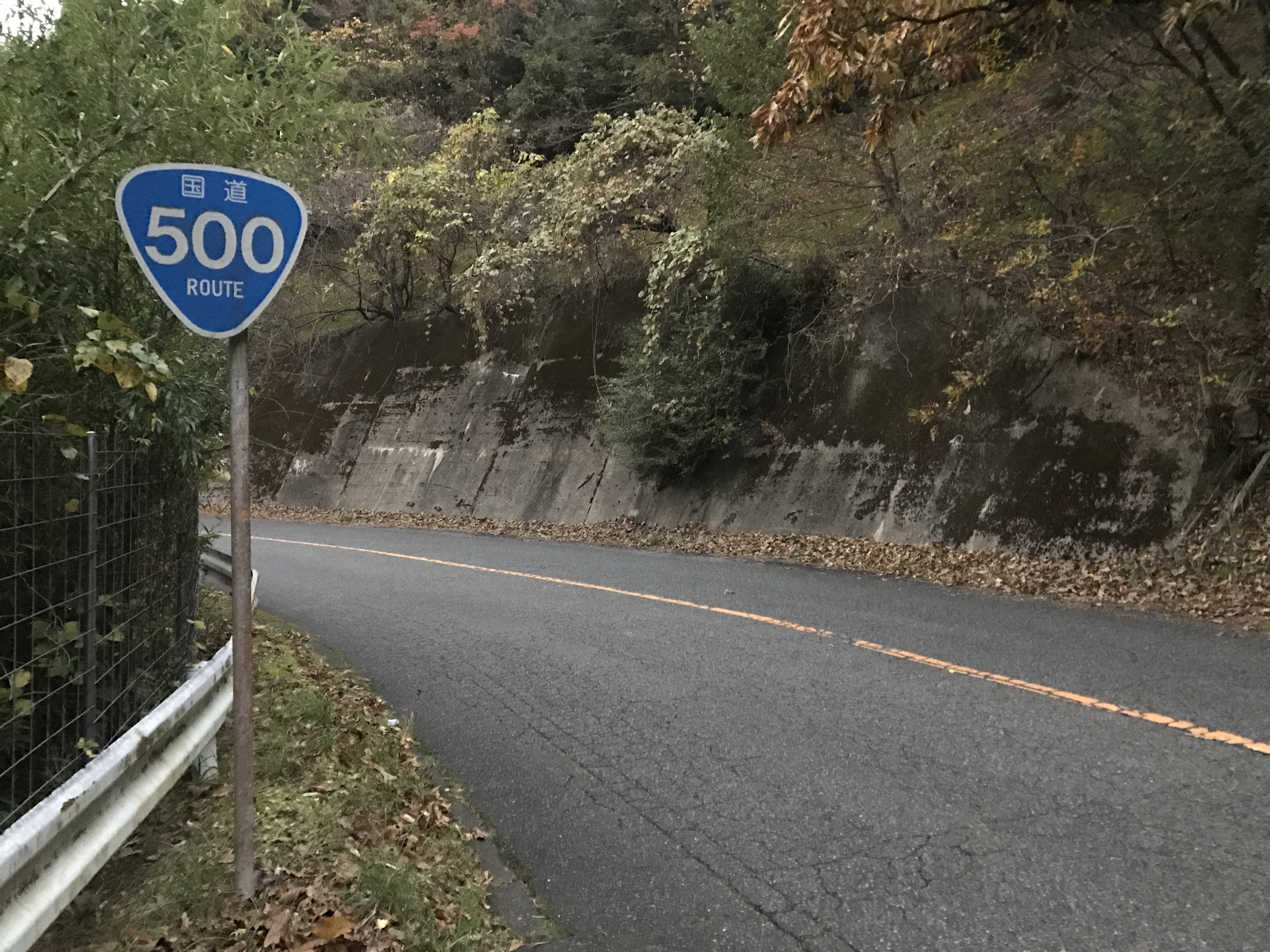

Route information
- Length: 160.9 km (100.0 mi)
- Existed: 1993–present

Major junctions
- West end: National Route 3 in Tosu, Saga
- East end: National Route 10 in Beppu, Ōita

Location
- Country: Japan

Highway system
- National highways of Japan; Expressways of Japan
← National Route 499	→ National Route 501

National Route 500 is a national highway of Japan connecting Beppu, Ōita and Tosu, Saga on the island of Kyushu, with a total length of 160.9 km (99.98 mi).
