= Kiyama Station (Saga) =

Railway station in Kiyama, Saga Prefecture, Japan

JB 12 Kiyama Station 基山駅
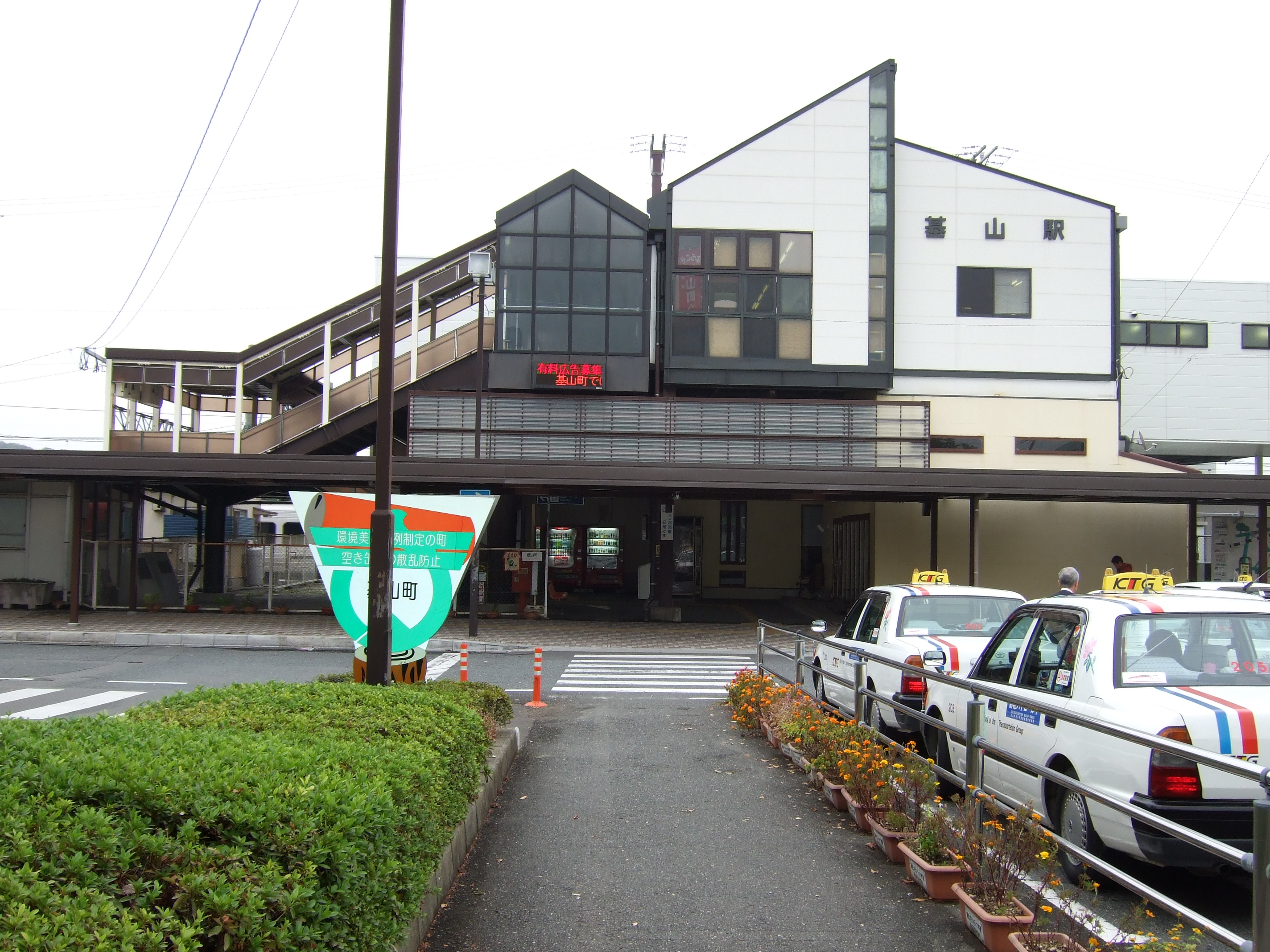
- Kiyama Station

General information
- Location: Kokura, Kiyama-cho, Miyaki-gun, Saga-ken 841-0201; Japan
- Coordinates: 33°25′15.37″N 130°31′55.93″E
- Operator: JR Kyushu; Amagi Railway
- Lines: JB Kagoshima Main Line; ■ Amagi Line
- Distance: 101.4 km from Mojikō
- Platforms: 2 side + 1 island platform

Construction
- Structure type: Elevated

Other information
- Status: Staffed (Midori no Madoguchi )
- Website: Official website

History
- Opened: 5 August 1921

Passengers
- FY2020: 2999 daily (JR); 841 (Amagi)
- Rank: 53rd (among JR Kyushu stations)

Services
Preceding station	JR Kyushu	Following station
Yayoigaoka towards Kagoshima	Kagoshima Main Line	Keyakidai towards Mojikō
Location
- Location within Saga Prefecture Location within Japan

Kiyama Station (基山駅, Kiyama-eki) is a passenger railway station located in the town of Kiyama, Saga Prefecture, Japan. It is jointly operated by JR Kyushu and the Amagi Railway, a third sector public-private partnership corporation.

== Lines ==
The station is served by the Kagoshima Main Line and is located 101.4 km from the starting point of the line at Mojikō. It is also the terminus of the Amagi Railway Amagi Line and is located 13.7 km from the opposing terminus of the line at Amagi.

== Layout ==
The JR portion of the station consists of one side platform and one island platform serving two tracks, connected by an elevated station building. The structure straddles Japan National Route 3, which runs parallel to the railway. The station has a Midori no Madoguchi staffed ticket office. The Amagi Railway portion of the station has one side platform and one track, located on the east side of the JR platforms. It uses former Platform 4 from the JNR era. The track is not connected to JR (the track beyond the car stop has not been removed, but has been filled with gravel and has become a dead end). There are no ticket gates or automatic ticket vending machines, but there is a waiting room, vending machines, and restrooms. There are no elevators. There is no connecting ticket gate with JR, so passengers transferring from JR to Amagi Railway need to exit the ticket gate first.

=== Platforms ===
1, 2	■ JB Kagoshima Main Line	for Orio, Kokura and Hakata
2, 3	■ JB Kagoshima Main Line	for Tosu and Kurume

1	■ Amagi Line	for Amagi

== History ==
On 11 November 1918, Japanese Government Railways (JGR) opened the Kiyamaguchi Signal Box (木山口信号場) at the present location of the station. On 5 August 1921, the facility was upgraded to a full station and renamed Kiyama. On 28 April 1939, Kiyama became the western terminus of the Amagi Line to Amagi. On 1 April 1986, Japanese National Railways (JNR), the successor of JGR, handed over control of the Amagi Line to the third sector corporation Amagi Railway. On 1 April 1987, with the privatization of JNR, JR Kyushu took over control of Kiyama station.

== Passenger statistics ==
In fiscal 2020, the JR station was used by an average of 2999 passengers daily (boarding passengers only), and it ranked 53rd among the busiest stations of JR Kyushu. During the same period, the Amagi Railway portion of the station was used by 841 passengers.

== Surrounding area ==
- Tomeikan Junior and Senior High School
- Japan National Route 3
- Daikōzen-ji (Saga)

== See also ==
- List of railway stations in Japan
