= 100 Soundscapes of Japan =

1996 list of environmental sounds

The 100 Soundscapes of Japan (日本の音風景100選) are a number of noises selected by the Ministry of the Environment as particularly representative of the country. They were chosen in 1996, as part of government efforts to combat noise pollution and to protect and promote protection of the environment.

There were 738 submissions received from all over the country and the 100 "best" were selected after examination by the Japan Soundscape Study Group. These soundscapes are intended to function as symbols for local people and to promote the rediscovery of the sounds of everyday life. The follow-up Sixth National Assembly on Soundscape Conservation was held in Matsuyama in 2002.

Soundscape	Category	Location	Prefecture	Image	Sound
Drift ice in the Sea of Okhotsk (オホーツク海の流氷)	Sea	Sea of Okhotsk shore	Hokkaidō		
Bell of Sapporo Clock Tower (時計台の鐘)	Bells	Sapporo	Hokkaidō		
Bell of Hakodate Russian Orthodox Church (函館ハリストス正教会の鐘)	Bells	Hakodate	Hokkaidō		
Mountain creatures in Asahidake, Mount Daisetsu (大雪山旭岳の山の生き物)	Wildlife	Higashikawa	Hokkaidō		
Japanese crane sanctuary, Tsurui (鶴居のタンチョウサンクチュアリ)	Birds	Tsurui	Hokkaidō		
Black-tailed gulls in Kabushima, Hachinohe Port (八戸港・蕪島のウミネコ)	Birds	Hachinohe	Aomori Prefecture		
Wild birds of Lake Ogawara shore (小川原湖畔の野鳥)	Birds	Misawa	Aomori Prefecture		
Oirase River stream (奥入瀬の渓流)	Water	Towadako	Aomori Prefecture		
Nebuta (Neputa) Festival (ねぶた祭・ねぷたまつり)	Matsuri	Aomori/Hirosaki	Aomori Prefecture		
Kaminari-iwa (Thunder Rock), Goishi coastline (碁石海岸・雷岩)	Sea	Ōfunato	Iwate Prefecture		
Nambu Fūrin (Japanese wind chimes) at Mizusawa Station (水沢駅の南部風鈴)	Local life	Ōshū	Iwate Prefecture		
Bells of Chagu Chagu Umakko (チャグチャグ馬コの鈴の音)	Matsuri	Takizawa	Iwate Prefecture		
Suzumushi (bell-ringing insects) in Miyagino (宮城野のスズムシ)	Insects	Sendai	Miyagi Prefecture		
Singing frogs and wild birds of the Hirose River (広瀬川のカジカガエルと野鳥)	Wildlife/Birds	Sendai	Miyagi Prefecture		
Reed fields at the mouth of the Kitakami River (北上川河口のヨシ原)	Vegetation	Ishinomaki	Miyagi Prefecture		
Wild geese in Izunuma and Uchinuma lakes (伊豆沼・内沼のマガン)	Birds	Kurikoma/Wakayanagi/Hasama	Miyagi Prefecture		
Pinewoods of wind (風の松原)	Vegetation	Noshiro	Akita Prefecture		
Cicadas at Yama-dera (山寺の蝉)	Insects	Yamagata	Yamagata Prefecture		
"Matsu-no-Kanjin" conches (trumpet shells) (松の勧進の法螺貝)	Matsuri	Tsuruoka	Yamagata Prefecture		
Swans at the mouth of Mogami River (最上川河口の白鳥)	Birds	Sakata	Yamagata Prefecture		
Little Birds Forest in Fukushima City (福島市小鳥の森)	Birds	Fukushima	Fukushima Prefecture		
Natural irrigation channel of Ōuchi-juku (大内宿の自然用水)	Water	Shimogō	Fukushima Prefecture		
Weaving of ramie fabric (からむし織のはた音)	Transport/Industry	Shōwa	Fukushima Prefecture		
Waves of Izura-kaigan coast (五浦海岸の波音)	Sea	Kita-ibaraki	Ibaraki Prefecture		
Tree frogs in Ajisai-zaka, Mount Ohirasan (太平山あじさい坂の雨蛙)	Frogs	Tochigi	Tochigi Prefecture		
Suikinkutsu in Suikintei Garden (水琴亭の水琴窟)	Daily life	Yoshii	Gunma Prefecture		
Time bell of Kawagoe (川越の時の鐘)	Bell	Kawagoe	Saitama Prefecture		
Insects singing in Oshikiri, Arakawa River (荒川・押切の虫の声)	Insects	Kumagaya (Kōnan)	Saitama Prefecture		
Waterfall on conduit bridge (樋橋の落水)	Water	Katori (Sawara)	Chiba Prefecture		
Himeharuzemi cicadas in Mamenbara (麻綿原のヒメハルゼミ)	Insects	Ōtaki	Chiba Prefecture		
Vicinity of Shibamata Taishakuten and "Yagiri-no-Watashi" ferry (柴又帝釈天界隈と矢切の渡し)	Complex	Matsudo/Katsushika	Chiba Prefecture/Tokyo		
Time bell at the hill of Ueno (上野のお山の時の鐘)	Bells	Taitō	Tokyo		
Sounds of birds, water, and trees at Sanpōji-ike Pond (三宝寺池の鳥と水と樹々の音)	Birds/Water/Vegetation	Nerima	Tokyo		
Keyaki (zelkova), tree-lined boulevard in Seikei Gakuen Campus (成蹊学園ケヤキ並木)	Vegetation	Musashino	Tokyo		
Ship whistles for the New Year at Yokohama Port (横浜港新年を迎える船の汽笛)	Local life	Yokohama	Kanagawa Prefecture		
Approach to Kawasaki Daishi Temple (川崎大師の参道)	Local life	Kawasaki	Kanagawa Prefecture		
Stream and wild birds singing sounds in Dohogawa Park (道保川公園のせせらぎと野鳥の声)	Water/Birds	Sagamihara	Kanagawa Prefecture		
Bean Geese in Fukushimagata Lagoon (福島潟のヒシクイ)	Birds	Niigata (Toyosaka)	Niigata Prefecture		
Himeharuzemi cicadas in Oyama (尾山のヒメハルゼミ)	Insects	Itoigawa (Nō)	Niigata Prefecture		
Shōmyō Falls (称名滝)	Waterfalls	Tateyama	Toyama Prefecture		
"Ennaka" channel and Owara Kaze no bon (エンナカの水音とおわら風の盆)	Matsuri	Toyama (Yatsuo)	Toyama Prefecture		
Wood carving in Inami (井波の木彫りの音)	Crafts	Nanto (Inami)	Toyama Prefecture		
Cicada chorus droning in Honda-no-Mori Forest (本多の森の蝉時雨)	Insects	Kanazawa	Ishikawa Prefecture		
Bells of temples in Teramachi (寺町寺院群の鐘)	Bells	Kanazawa	Ishikawa Prefecture		
Tokimizu fountain in Minowaki (蓑脇の時水)	Water	Echizen (Takefu)	Fukui Prefecture		
Wild birds forest at lakeshore at the foot of Mount Fuji (富士山麓・西湖畔の野鳥の森)	Birds	Fujikawaguchiko	Yamanashi Prefecture		
Bell of Zenkō-ji (善光寺の鐘)	Bells	Nagano	Nagano Prefecture		
Little birds singing in Enrei (塩嶺の小鳥のさえずり)	Birds	Okaya/Shiojiri	Nagano Prefecture		
Frogs singing in Yashima-shitsugen Wetland (八島湿原の蛙鳴)	Wildlife	Shimosuwa/Suwa	Nagano Prefecture		
Suikinkutsu in Udatsu-no-machi (卯建の町の水琴窟)	Local life	Mino	Gifu Prefecture		
Playing in Yoshida River (吉田川の川遊び)	Local life	Gujō (Hachiman)	Gifu Prefecture		
Cormorant Fishing on the Nagara River (長良川の鵜飼)	Local life	Gifu/Seki	Gifu Prefecture		
"Nami-Kozo", rumbling of the Enshunada Sea (遠州灘の海鳴・波小僧)	Water	Enshunada Sea	Shizuoka Prefecture		
Steam locomotives of Ōigawa Railway (大井川鐵道のSL)	Transport/Industry	Kawanehon (Honkawane)	Shizuoka Prefecture		
Wild birds of Higashiyama Botanical Garden (東山植物園の野鳥)	Birds	Nagoya	Aichi Prefecture		
Wave sounds at Kojigahama Beach, Cape Irago (伊良湖岬恋路ヶ浜の潮騒)	Sea	Tahara (Atsumi)	Aichi Prefecture		
Isobue whistling of female divers in Ise-Shima area (伊勢志摩の海女の磯笛)	Local life	Toba/Shima	Mie Prefecture		
Evening bell of Mii (三井の晩鐘)	Bells	Ōtsu	Shiga Prefecture		Video
Hikone Castle time bell and insects singing (彦根城の時報鐘と虫の音)	Bells/Insects	Hikone	Shiga Prefecture		
Bamboo forest in Kyoto (京の竹林)	Vegetation	Kyoto	Kyoto Prefecture		
Rurikei stream (るり渓)	Water	Nantan (Sonobe)	Kyoto Prefecture		
Squeaking sand of Kotobikihama Beach (琴引浜の鳴き砂)	Singing sand	Kyōtango (Amino)	Kyoto Prefecture		
Matsumushi crickets (Xenogrillus marmorata) at the banks of Yodo River (淀川河川敷のマツムシ)	Insects	Osaka	Osaka Prefecture		
Kawachi Ondo song in the precincts of Jōkō-ji (常光寺境内の河内音頭)	Matsuri	Yao	Osaka Prefecture		
Sand eel fishing at Tarumi Port (垂水漁港のイカナゴ漁)	Local life	Kobe	Hyōgo Prefecture		
Danjiri Drums at Kenka Matsuri of Nada (灘のけんか祭りのだんじり太鼓)	Matsuri	Himeji	Hyōgo Prefecture		
Deer of Kasugano and temple bells in the neighbourhood (春日野の鹿と諸寺の鐘)	Wildlife/Bells	Nara	Nara Prefecture		
Kino River heard inside the giant rock of Mount Fudō (不動山の巨石で聞こえる紀ノ川)	Water	Hashimoto	Wakayama Prefecture		
Nachi Falls (那智の滝)	Waterfalls	Nachikatsuura	Wakayama Prefecture		
Migratory birds at Mizutori Park (水鳥公園の渡り鳥)	Birds	Yonago	Tottori Prefecture		
Mitoku River and singing frogs (三徳川のせせらぎとカジカガエル)	Wildlife	Misasa	Tottori Prefecture		
Inshu paper-making (因州和紙の紙すき)	Crafts	Tottori (Aoya/Saji)	Tottori Prefecture		
Squeaking sand of Kotogahama Beach (琴ヶ浜海岸の鳴き砂)	Singing sand	Ōda	Shimane Prefecture		
Stream and waterwheels of Bitchu River, Suwada Cave (諏訪洞・備中川のせせらぎと水車)	Water	Maniwa (Hokubō)	Okayama Prefecture		
Brooks of Shinjōshuku (新庄宿の小川)	Water	Shinjō	Okayama Prefecture		
Bell of Peace in Hiroshima (広島の平和の鐘)	Bells	Hiroshima	Hiroshima Prefecture		
Kyo-onro tower bell at Senkō-ji (千光寺驚音楼の鐘)	Bells	Onomichi	Hiroshima Prefecture		
Yamaguchi Line steam locomotives (山口線のＳＬ)	Transport/Industry	Ogōri/Tsuwano	Yamaguchi/Shimane Prefecture		
Eddying current of Naruto (鳴門の渦潮)	Sea	Naruto	Tokushima Prefecture		
Awa Odori dance (阿波踊り)	Matsuri	Tokushima	Tokushima Prefecture		
Ōkubo-ji bell and pilgrim bells (大窪寺の鐘とお遍路さんの鈴)	Bells	Sanuki (Nagao)	Kagawa Prefecture		
Mannō-ike Pond "Yuru-nuki" streams (満濃池のゆるぬきとせせらぎ)	Water	Mannō	Kagawa Prefecture		
Time drums of Shin-u Kaku Hotel, Dōgo Onsen (道後温泉振鷺閣の刻太鼓)	Drums	Matsuyama	Ehime Prefecture		
Wave sounds of Mikurodo Cave, Cape Muroto (室戸岬・御厨人窟の波音)	Sea	Muroto	Kōchi Prefecture		
Kaki Yamakasa of Hakata Gion Yamakasa (博多祗園山笠の舁き山笠)	Matsuri	Fukuoka	Fukuoka Prefecture		
Bell of Kanzeon-ji (観世音寺の鐘)	Bells	Dazaifu	Fukuoka Prefecture		
Wave sounds and ship whistles at the Kanmon-kaikyo Strait (関門海峡の潮騒と汽笛)	Sea	Kitakyūshū/Shimonoseki	Fukuoka/Yamaguchi Prefecture		
Hikiyama-bayashi music at Karatsu Kunchi Festival (唐津くんちの曳山囃子)	Matsuri	Karatsu	Saga Prefecture		
Imari pottery (伊万里の焼物の音)	Crafts	Imari	Saga Prefecture		
Atomic air-raided camphor tree at Sanno Jinja (山王神社被爆の楠の木)	Vegetation	Nagasaki	Nagasaki Prefecture		
Water discharge at Tsūjunkyō Bridge (通潤橋の放水)	Water	Yamato (Yabe)	Kumamoto Prefecture		
Dolphins in the sea of Itsuwa (五和の海のイルカ)	Wildlife	Amakusa (Itsuwa)	Kumamoto Prefecture		
Water scoop (hydropower) of Onta Sarayama (小鹿田皿山の唐臼)	Water/Crafts	Onta	Ōita Prefecture		
Soughing of the wind through pine trees of Oka Castle remains (岡城跡の松籟)	Vegetation	Taketa	Ōita Prefecture		
"Yagura-no-Todoro" water roaring at Sannomiyakyō Gorge (三之宮峡の櫓の轟)	Waterfalls	Kobayashi	Miyazaki Prefecture		
Wild deer of Ebino-kōgen Highlands (えびの高原の野生鹿)	Wildlife	Ebino	Miyazaki Prefecture		
Cranes of Izumi (出水のツル)	Birds	Izumi	Kagoshima Prefecture		
Chigami River stream and trams (千頭川の渓流とトロッコ)	Water/Local life	Yakushima	Kagoshima Prefecture		
Subtropical creatures along Shiira River (後良川周辺の亜熱帯林の生き物)	Wildlife	Taketomi (Iriomote)	Okinawa Prefecture		
Eisa (エイサー)	Matsuri	Yonashiro/Katsuren	Okinawa Prefecture		

== See also ==
- Soundscape ecology
- Ecoacoustics
- Biophony
- World Soundscape Project
- 100 Landscapes of Japan (Heisei era)
