= Nyoirin-ji (Ogori) =

Temple in Ogori, Fukuoka Prefecture, Japan

Nyoirin-ji 如意輪寺
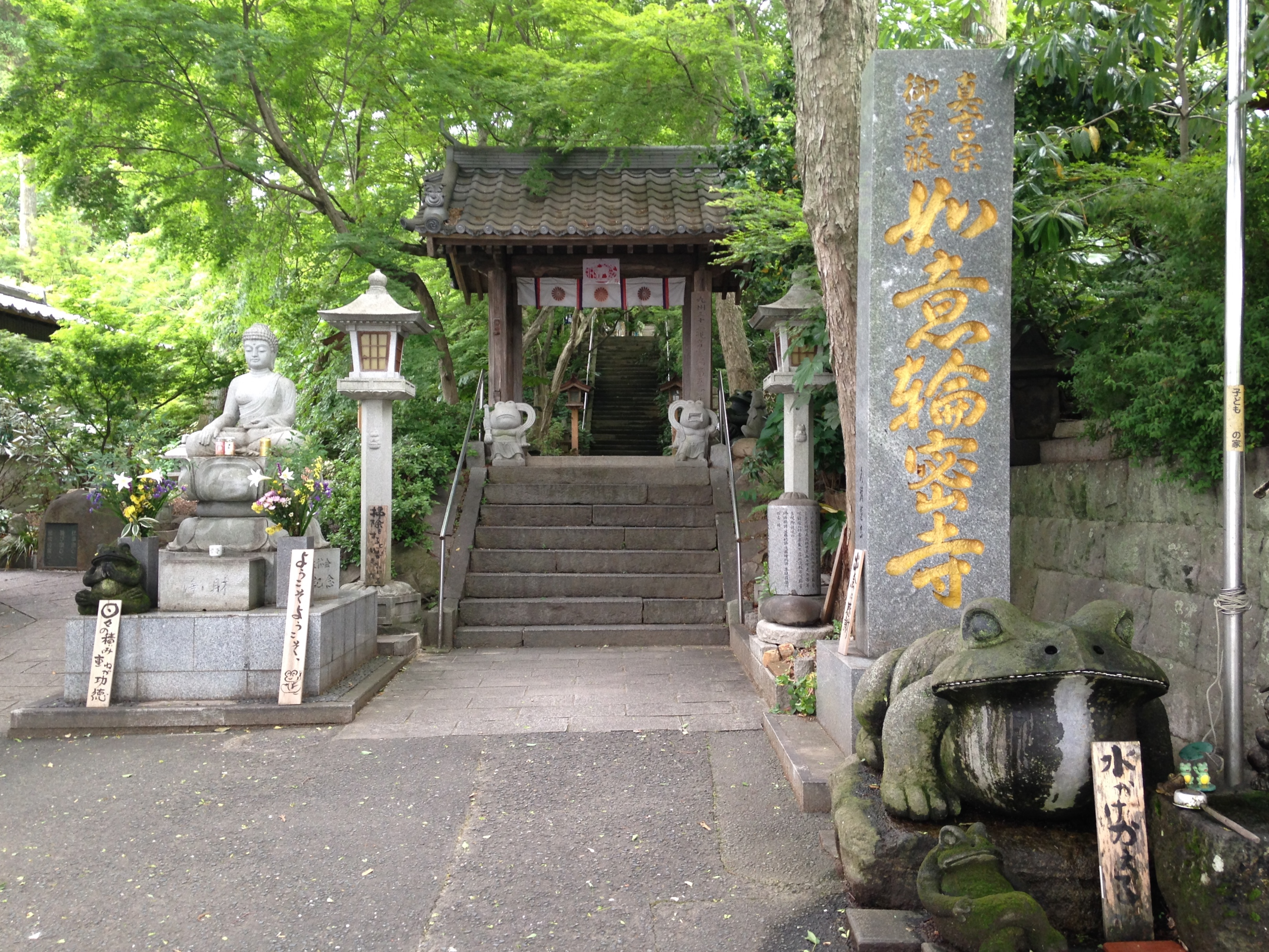
- The Sanmon Gate

Religion
- Affiliation: Shingon
- Deity: Nyorai (Tathāgata)

Location
- Location: 1728 Yokoguma, Ogōri, Fukuoka Prefecture
- Country: Japan
- Interactive map of Nyoirin-ji 如意輪寺
- Coordinates: 33°25′39.2″N 130°34′03.1″E

Architecture
- Founder: Gyōki
- Completed: 729

Website
- http://www.kyushyu24.com/frm10.aspx

Nyoirin-ji (如意輪寺) is a Shingon temple in Ogōri, Fukuoka Prefecture, Japan. The temple, which is famed for its frog figurines, is commonly referred to as Kaeru-dera (カエル寺, frog temple), while the formal name is Seieizan Nyoirin-ji (清影山如意輪寺).

== History ==
The temple was founded on the order of Empress Kōken in 729 and consecrated by the monk Gyōki. In 1586, however, the temple was temporally shut down in the fire caused by war. Then, in the early Edo period, the main hall was rebuilt by Arima Tadayori (有馬忠頼), the second feudal lord of Kurume Domain.

Today, the temple and its surrounding grounds receive more than 30 thousand visitors annually.

== Sights ==
=== Frog figurines ===
The former chief priest of Nyoirin-ji Temple went on a trip to China, brought back a frog figurine made out of jade and placed it in the temple. With that as a starting point, he began collecting frog figurines in 1992 with the goals of changing the atmosphere of the temple and attracting young people to visit. There are now more than 5,000 figurines placed in the temple.

=== Wind chimes ===
About 2,500 Japanese wind chimes called fūrin (風鈴) are hung up at the temple during the summer. Visitors can buy a fūrin for 500 yen, write their wishes on the paper hanging from the fūrin, then hang it at the temple.

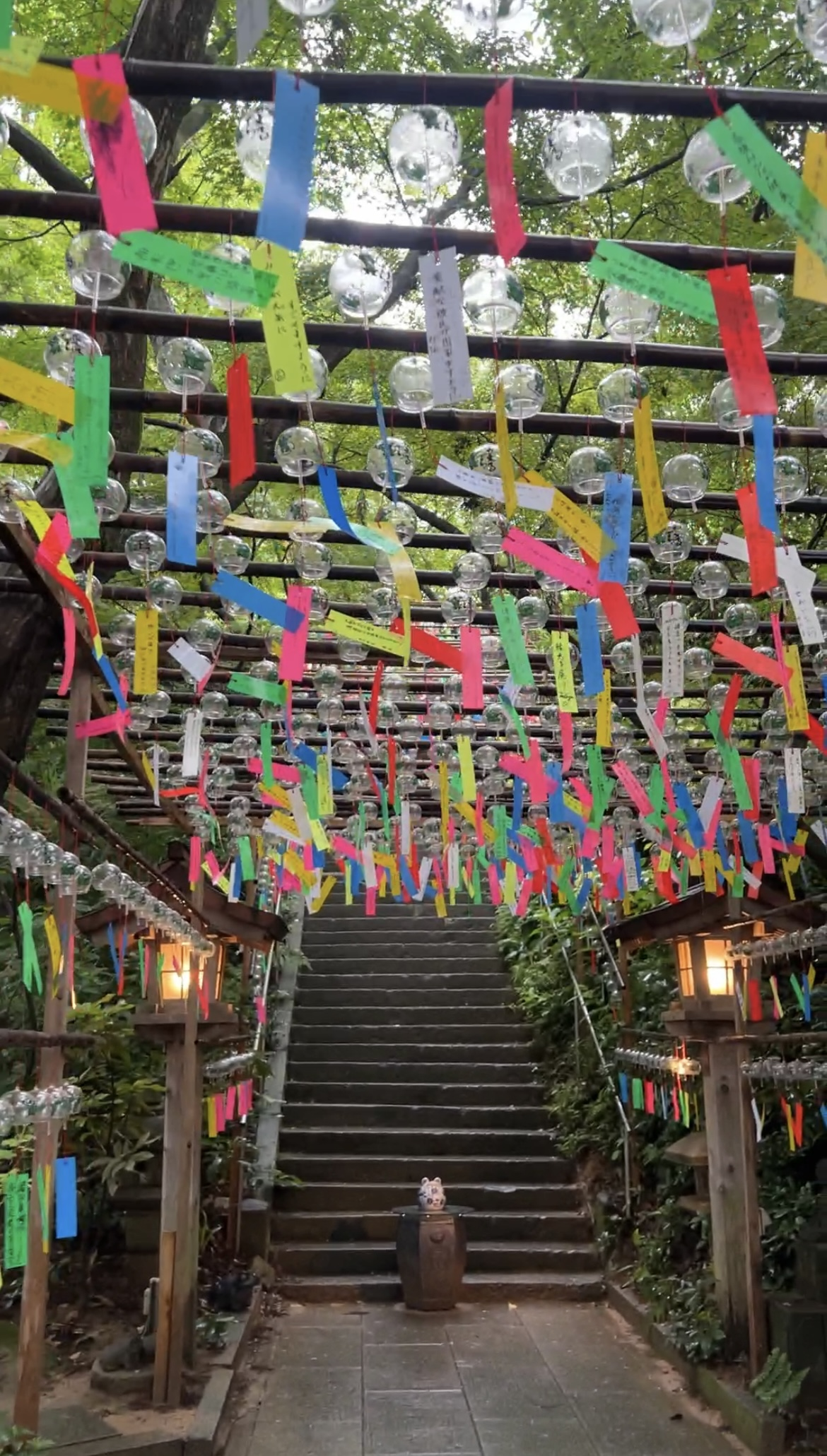
Fūrin wind chimes at Nyoirin-ji with visitors' wishes written on colored paper hanging from them

== Nyoirin Kannon ==
The statue of the Nyoirin Kannon is said to have been carved by the monk Gyōki. As a "hidden Buddha," it is concealed and can only be seen during the year of snake every 12 years.
