= Water scoop =

Water scoop may refer to:

- A device on a steam locomotive used to replenish water while in motion, see: Track pan
- A simple hydraulic power machine, see Water scoop (hydropower)
