= Mobile (sculpture) =

Type of kinetic sculpture

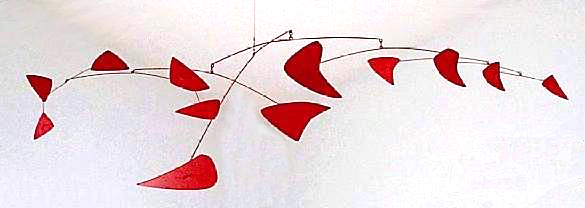
Alexander Calder, Red Mobile, 1956, Painted sheet metal and metal rods, a signature work by Calder – Montreal Museum of Fine Arts.

A mobile (UK: /ˈmoʊbaɪl/, US: /ˈmoʊbiːl/) is a type of kinetic sculpture constructed to take advantage of the principle of equilibrium. It consists of a number of rods, from which weighted objects or further rods hang. The objects hanging from the rods balance each other, so that the rods remain more or less horizontal. Each rod hangs from only one string, which gives it the freedom to rotate about the string. An ensemble of these balanced parts hang freely in space, by design without coming into contact with each other.

Mobiles are popular in the nursery, where they hang over cribs to give infants entertainment and visual stimulation. Mobiles have inspired many composers, including Morton Feldman and Earle Brown who were inspired by Alexander Calder's mobiles to create mobile-like indeterminate pieces. John Cage wrote the music for the short film Works of Calder that focused on Calder's mobiles. Frank Zappa stated that his compositions employ a principle of balance similar to Calder mobiles.

== Origin ==
The meaning of the term "mobile" as applied to sculpture has evolved since it was first suggested by Marcel Duchamp in 1931 to describe the early, mechanized creations of Alexander Calder. At this point, "mobile" was synonymous with the term "kinetic art", describing sculptural works in which motion is a defining property. While motor- or crank-driven moving sculptures may have initially prompted it, the word "mobile" later came to refer more specifically to Calder's free-moving creations. Calder in many respects invented an art form where objects (typically brightly coloured, abstract shapes fashioned from sheet metal) are connected by wire, much like a balance scale. By the sequential attachment of additional objects, the final creation consists of many balanced parts joined by lengths of wire whose individual elements are capable of moving independently or as a whole when prompted by air movement or direct contact. Thus, "mobile" has become a more well-defined term with its origin in the many such hanging constructs Calder produced in a prolific manner between the 1930s and his death in 1976.

== Similar works ==
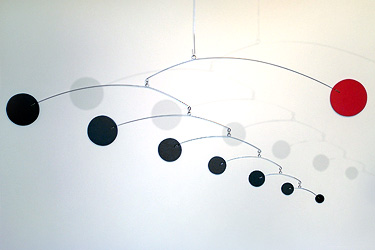
Mobile by Julie Frith

Four Lines Oblique II by George Rickey in Vienna (video, 9 sec, no sound)

Calder's work is the only one defined by the term "mobile"; however, three other notable artists worked on a similar concept. Man Ray experimented with this idea around 1920, Armando Reverón who during the 30s made a series of movable skeletons and Bruno Munari created his "Aerial Machine" in 1929 and the "Useless Machines" in 1933, made in cardboard and playful colors. In 1920s, however, Russian constructivists Rodchenko, Tatlin and Naum Gabo had already experimented with suspended kinetic sculptures an example being the "Oval Hanging Construction No.12". Also Julio Le Parc, Grand Prize winner at the Venice Biennale in 1966.

== See also ==
- Dreamcatcher
- Stabile (disambiguation)
- Straw mobile
- Suncatcher
- Wind chime
