= Onta ware =

Type of Japanese pottery

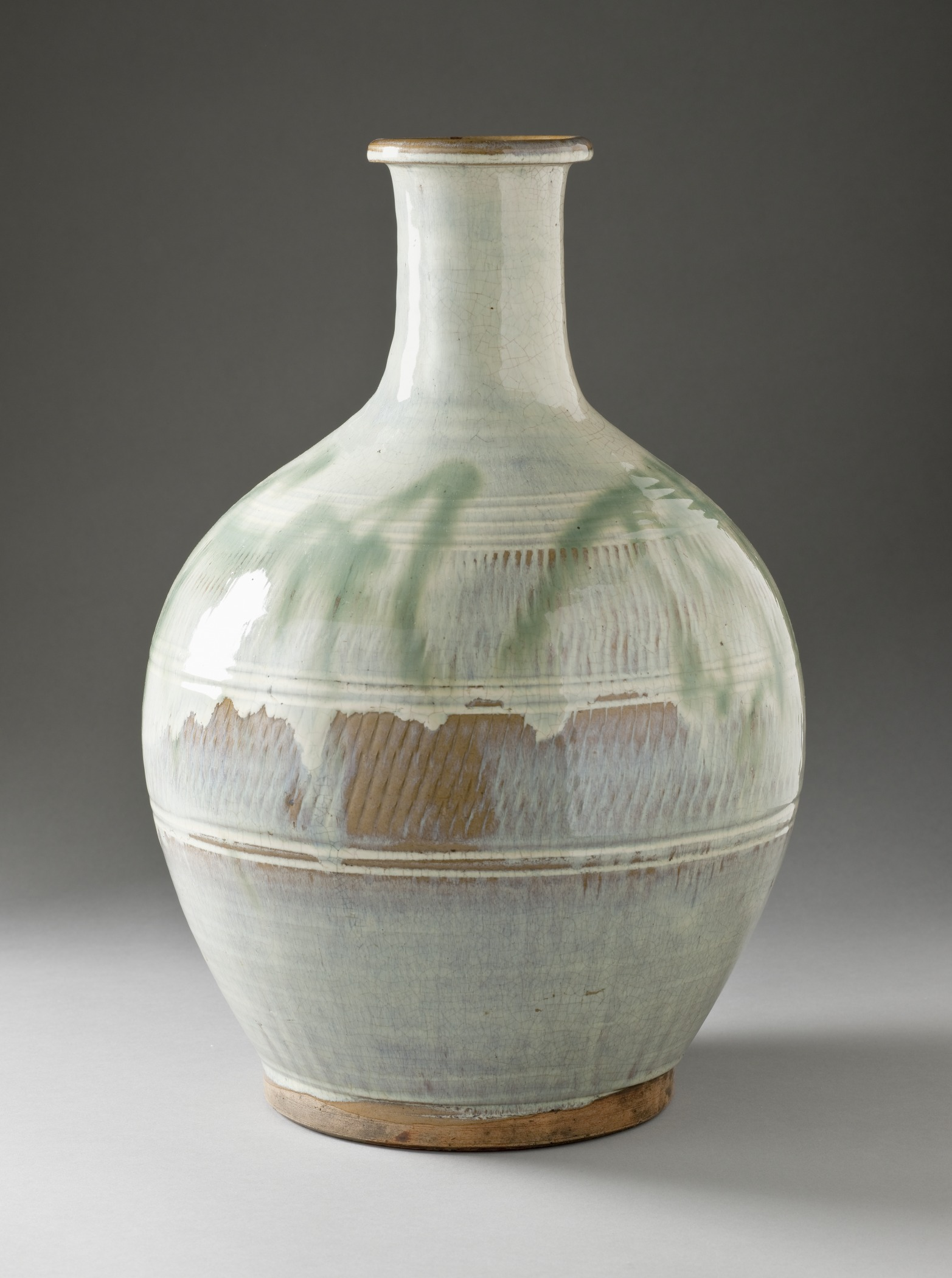
Onta ware sake bottle (tokkuri), 19th century

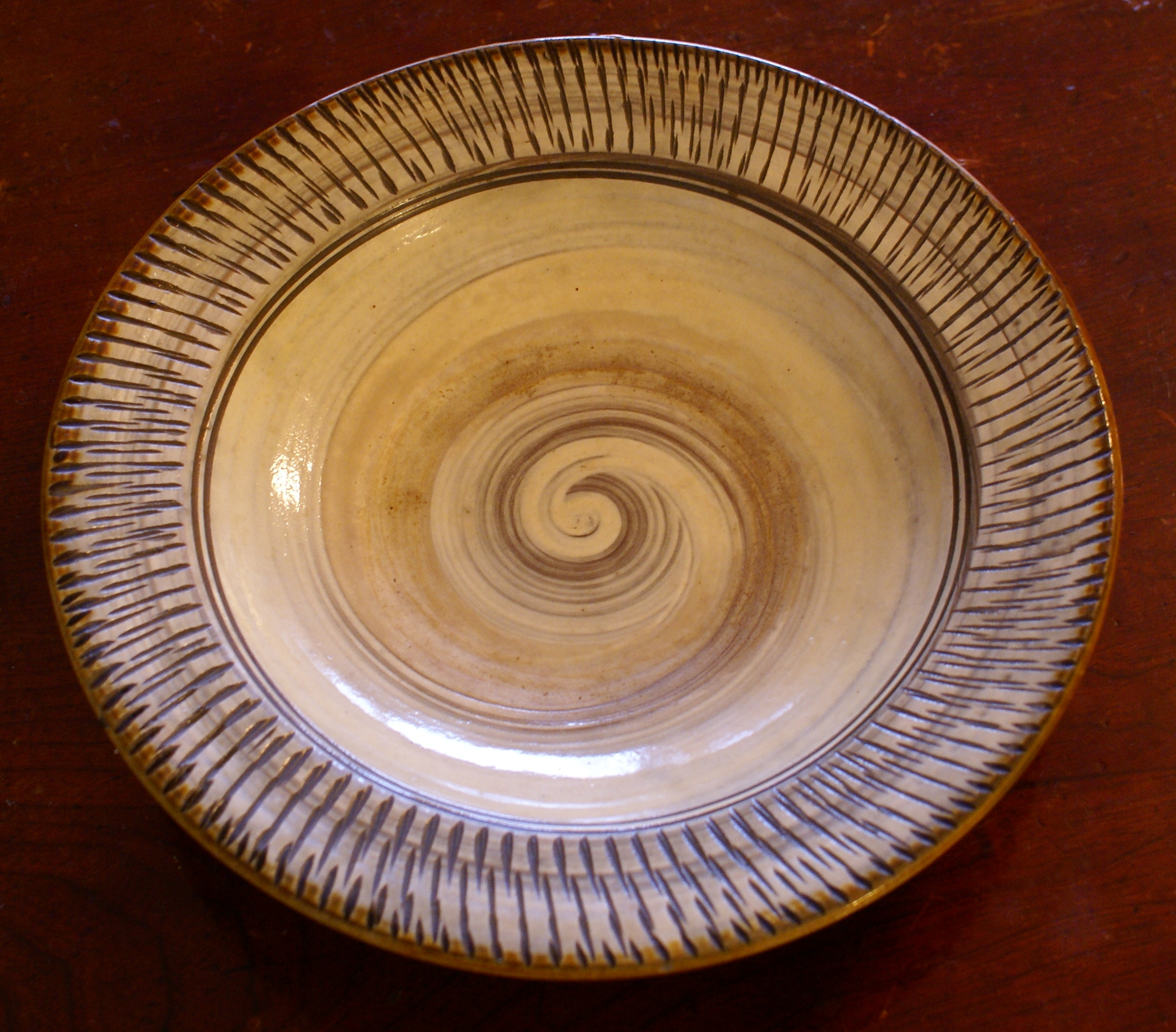
Onta slipware bowl

Onta ware (小鹿田焼, Onta-yaki), also spelled Onda, is a type of Japanese pottery produced in and around the village of Onta in Ōita Prefecture, Japan.

== History ==
The production dates back to the early 18th century CE. Onta ware is closely associated with Mingei folk art.

Onta ware was inscribed by the national government in 1995 as an Intangible Cultural Property. The area has also been inscribed as one of the protected 100 Soundscapes of Japan.

== Production ==
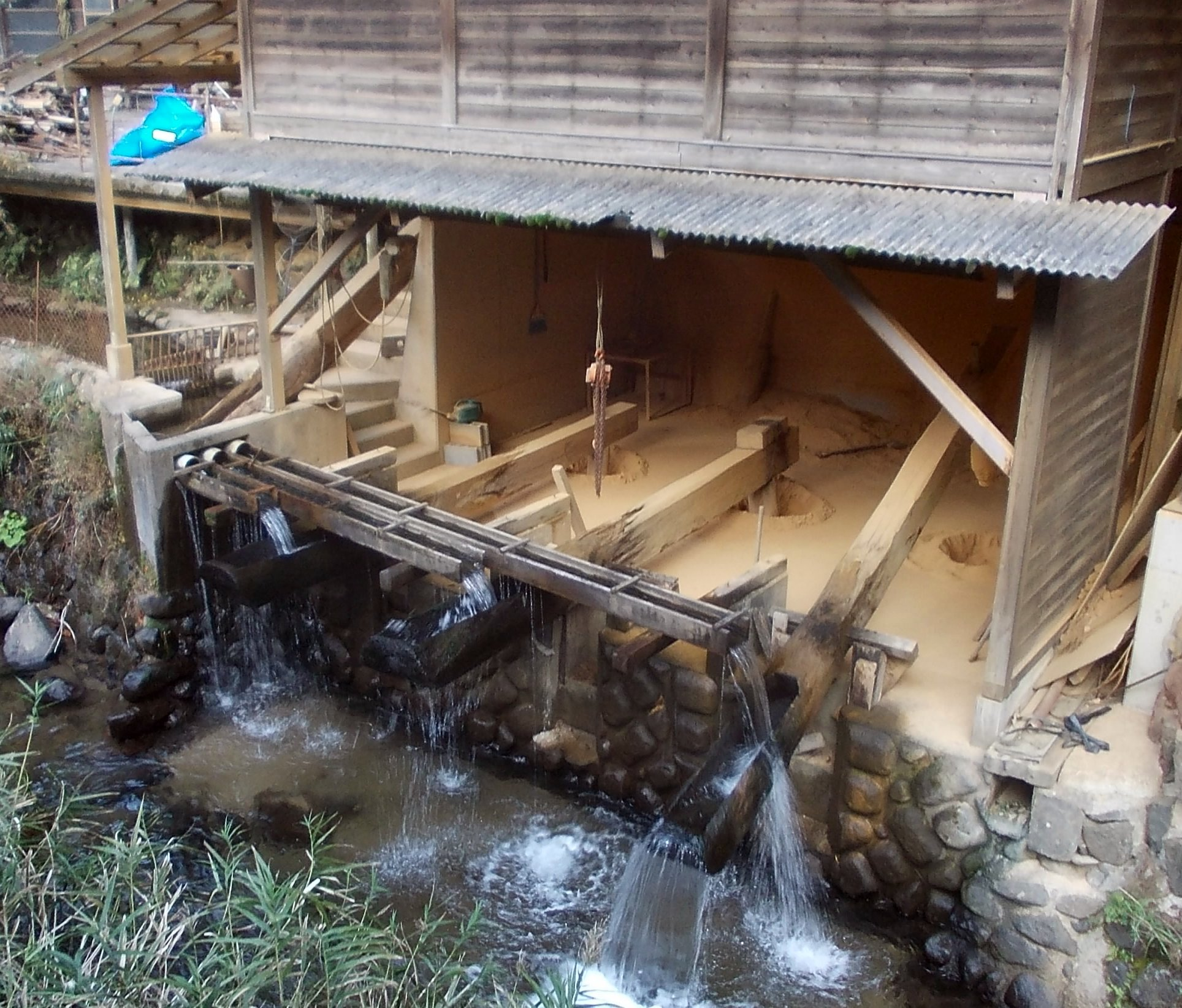
Water scoop or mill (kara-usu), used for the preparation of the earth

The earth for the pottery is found in the mountains around Onta. It normally comes in the form of rocks and needs to be ground to a powder. This is done by the usage of traditional water scoops or mills called kara-usu, which rely purely on the flow of the river. The wooden mills grind the earth into a powder, which is then washed and filtered multiple times to purify the material. It is then dried, sometimes over a large oven. The village has a self-imposed limit on how much earth can be taken from the mountains each year to ensure that there is enough material for future generations to continue production.

Video of kara-usu water scoops in Onta, Oita. The sound is one of the protected 100 Soundscapes of Japan.

The village is a tightly-knit community composed of, as of 2024, ten families of potters going back generations. The work such as the purification of the earth is done by women, while men are responsible for actually creating the wares. Pieces are never signed by an individual but only with the sign of the Onta village. This is to signify that the production of a single vessel was the combined work of the community, not just one person.

Onta ware traditionally consists of utility vessels such as bowls, plates, and tea cups. The style is most often slipware.

== See also ==
- Mishima ware, which also uses the slip technique
- Koishiwara ware
