= Wind chime =

Percussion instrument constructed by rods, bells, tubes suspended in air

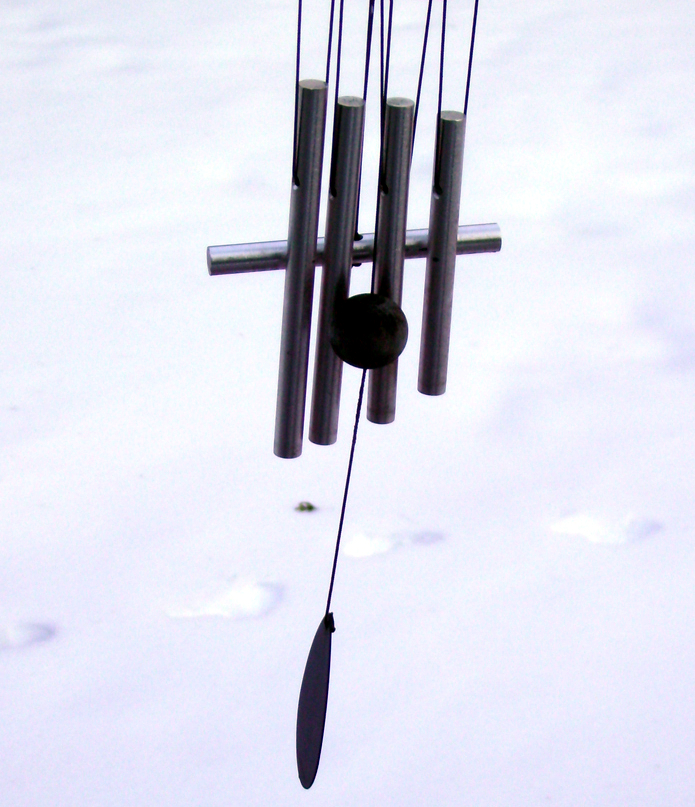
A metal wind chime

Wind chimes are a type of percussion instrument constructed from suspended tubes, rods, bells, or other objects that are often made of metal or wood. The tubes or rods are suspended along with some type of weight or surface which the tubes or rods can strike when they or another wind-catching surface are blown by the natural movement of air outside.

They are usually hung outside of a building or residence as a visual and aural garden ornament. Since the percussion instruments are struck according to the random effects of the wind blowing the chimes, wind chimes have been considered an example of chance-based music. The tubes or rods may sound either indistinct pitches, or fairly distinct pitches. Wind chimes that sound fairly distinct pitches can, through the chance movement of air, create simple songs or broken chords.

== History ==
=== Ancient Rome ===
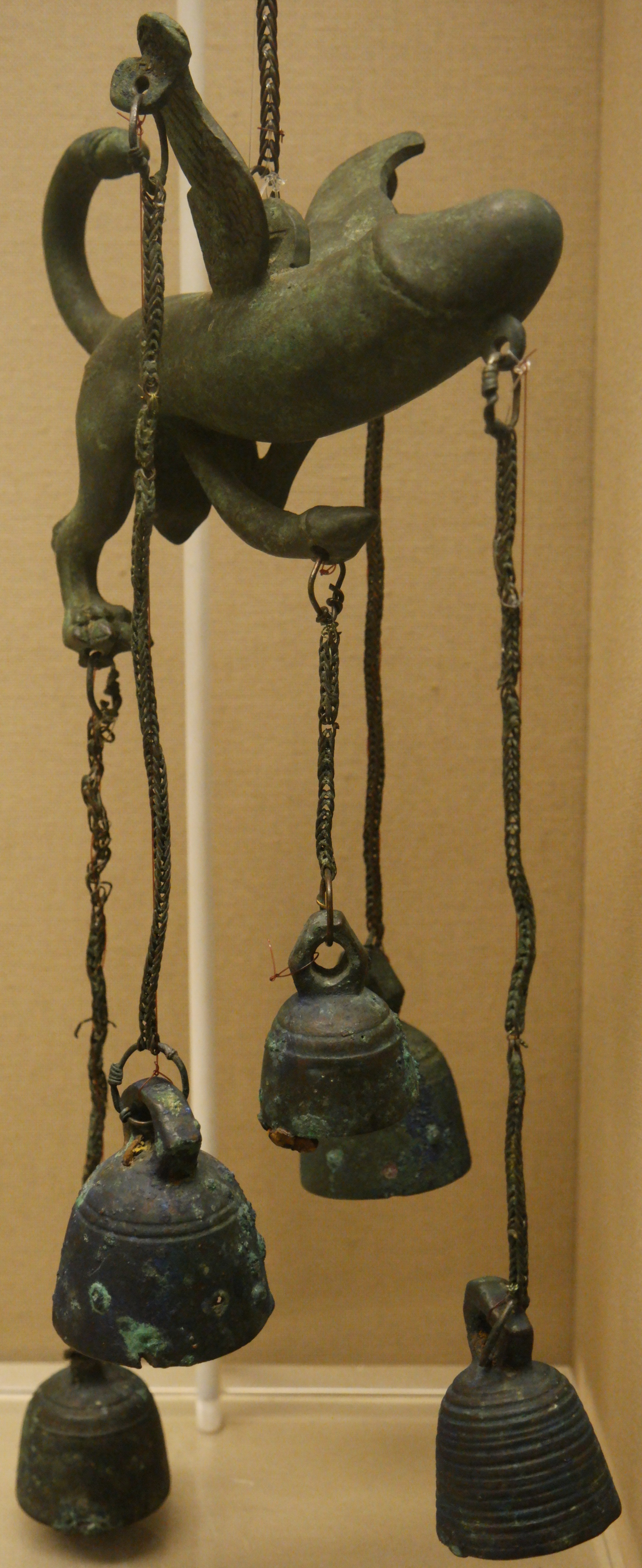
Bronze tintinnabulum, Roman, 1st century CE, British Museum.

Ancient Roman wind chimes, usually made of bronze, were called tintinnabula and were hung in gardens, courtyards, and porticoes where wind movement caused them to tinkle. Bells were believed to ward off malevolent spirits and were often combined with a phallus, which was also a symbol of good fortune and a charm against the evil eye. The image shows one example with a phallus portrayed with wings and the feet of an animal, and a phallus for a tail. These additions increased its protective powers.

=== Eastern and Southern Asia ===
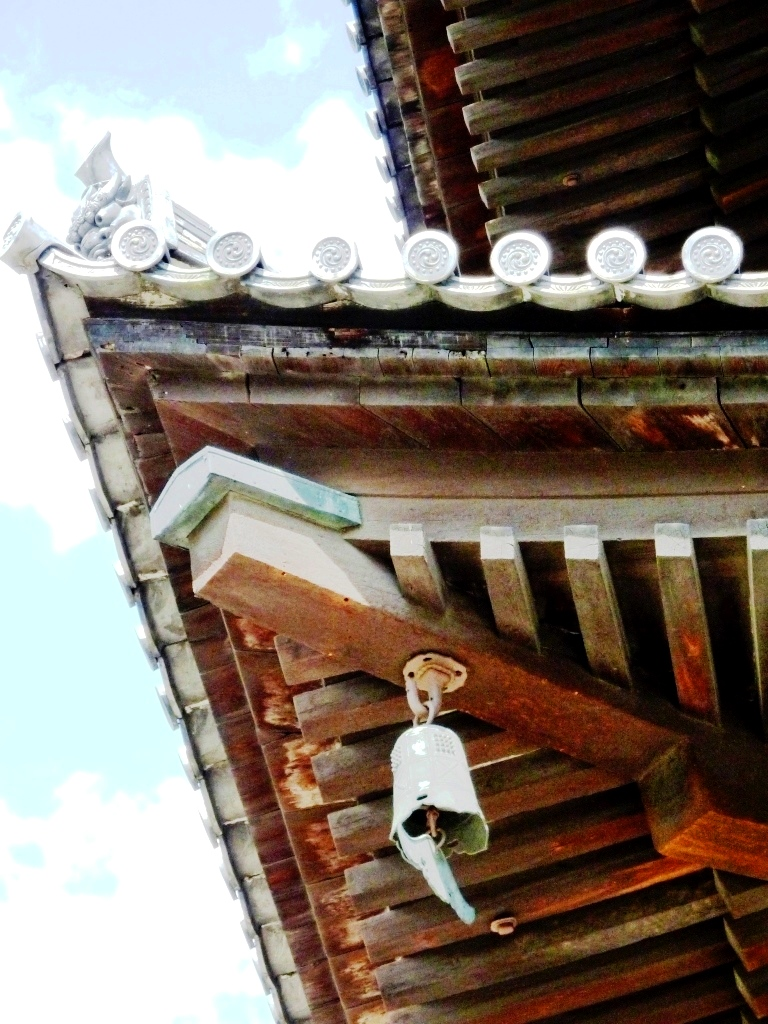
Wind-powered bell or wind chime under temple eaves,. Banna-ji. Ashikaga, Tochigi. Japan

In India during the second century CE, and later in China, extremely large pagodas became popular with small wind bells hung at each corner; the slightest breeze caused the clapper, which was also made of bronze, to swing, producing a melodious tinkling. It is said that these bells were originally intended to frighten away not only birds but also any lurking evil spirits. Wind bells are also hung under the corners of temple, palace and home roofs; they are not limited to pagodas. Japanese glass wind bells known as fūrin (風鈴) have been produced since the Edo period, and those at Mizusawa Station are one of the 100 Soundscapes of Japan. Wind chimes are thought to be good luck in parts of Asia and are used in Feng Shui.

Wind chimes started to become modernized around 1100 C.E. after the Chinese began to use metal casting to create bells. A bell without a clapper, called a yong-zhong, was crafted by skilled metal artisans and primarily used in religious ceremonies. Afterwards, the Chinese created the feng-ling (風鈴), which is similar to today's modern wind bell. Feng-lings were hung from shrines and pagodas to ward off evil spirits and attract benevolent ones. Today, wind chimes are common in the East and used to maximize the flow of chi, or life's energy.

== Sounds and music ==
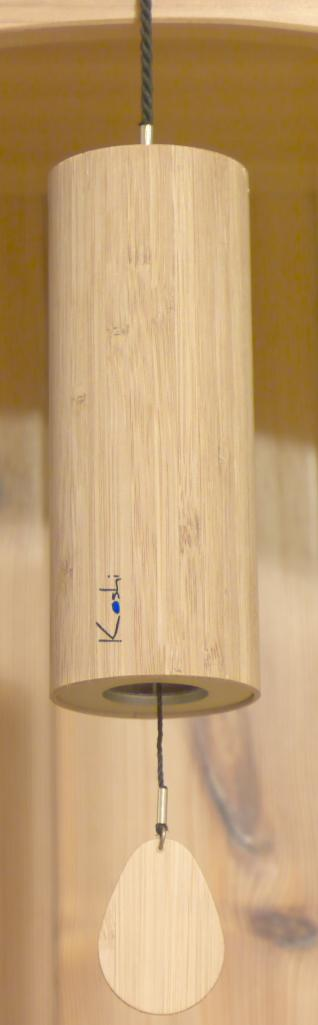
Wind chime with the audible tones a1-d2-f2-g2-a2-d3-f3-a3. The bamboo cylinder is not only the case of the instrument, but at the same time it is the resonator. The eight tones are produced by eight metal rods within the cylinder which are centrally struck by a disk attached to the cord with the wind sail.

Chimes produce inharmonic (as opposed to harmonic) spectra, although if they are hung at about 2/9 of their length (22.4%), some of the higher partials are damped and the fundamental rings the loudest. This is common practice in high-quality wind chimes, which are also usually hung so the centre ball strikes the centre of the wind chime's length, also resulting in the loudest sounding fundamental. Frequency is determined by the length, width, thickness, and material. There are formulas that help predict the proper length to achieve a particular note, though a bit of fine tuning is often needed.

Most chimes employ pentatonic or tetratonic scales as the basis for the pitches of their individual chimes as opposed to the traditional western heptatonic scale. This is largely due to the fact that these scales inherently contain fewer dissonant intervals, and therefore sound more pleasant to the average listener when notes are struck at random.

In instruments such as organ pipes, the pitch is determined primarily by the length of the air column, because it is the resonance of the air column that generates the sound. The pipe material helps determine the "timbre" or "voice" of the pipe, but the air column determines the pitch. In a wind chime, the vibrations of the pipe itself radiate the sound after being struck, so the air column has little to do with the pitch being produced.

Sound can be produced when the tubes or rods come in contact with a suspended central clapper in the form of a ball or horizontal disk, or with each other.

Wind chimes may be used to observe changes in wind direction, depending on where they are hung when they commence to sound.

== Materials ==
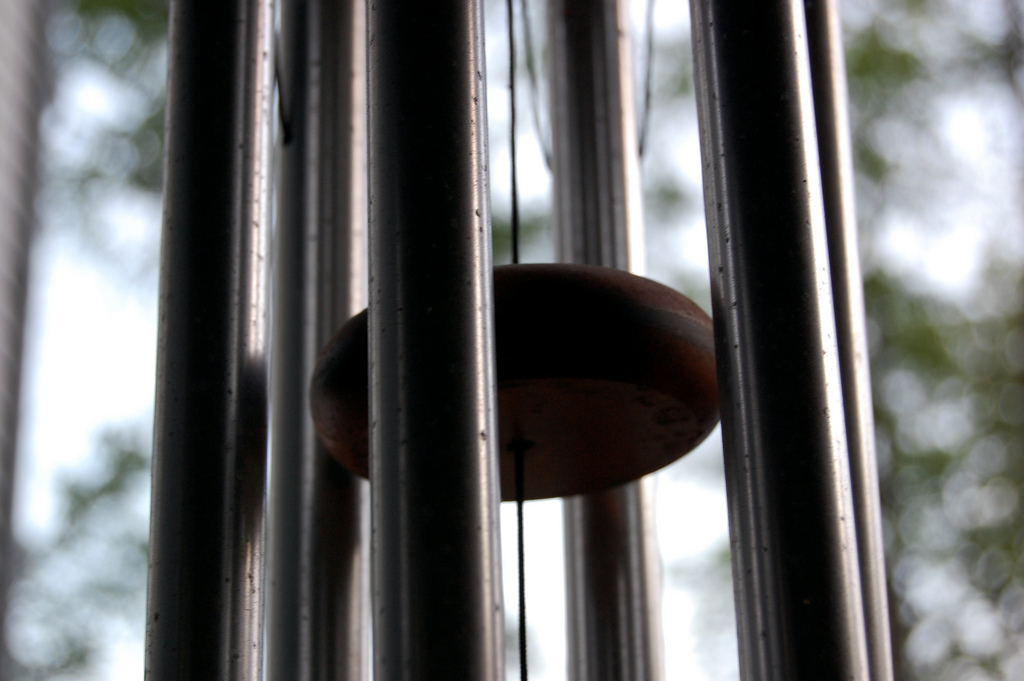
A close-up of metal rods on a wind chime

Wind chimes
A recording of wind chimes.

Wind chimes can be made of materials other than metal or wood and in shapes other than tubes or rods. Other wind chimes materials include glass, bamboo, shell, stone, earthenware, stoneware, beads, keys and porcelain. More exotic items, such as silverware or cookie cutters, can also be recycled (or upcycled) to create wind chimes. The selected material can have a large effect on the sound a wind chime produces. The sounds produced by recycled objects such as these are not as easily tunable to specific notes and range from pleasant tinkling to dull thuds. The sounds produced by properly sized wind chime tubes are tunable to notes. As aluminum is the common metal with the lowest internal damping, wind chimes are often made from aluminum to achieve the longest and loudest sounding chime.

The tone depends on factors such as the material used, the exact alloy, heat treatment, and whether a solid cylinder or a tube is used. If a tube is used, the wall thickness also affects the tone. Tone may also depend on the hanging method. The tone quality also depends on the material of the object that is used to hit the chimes.

With clay wind chimes, the higher the final firing temperature, the brighter and more ringing the resulting tone. Earthenware clay fired at lower temperatures produces a duller sound than stoneware clay fired at higher temperatures. Stoneware wind chimes are also more durable and able to resist stronger winds without suffering chipping or damage.

== Mathematics of tubular wind chimes ==
The mode 1 (lowest frequency) vibration of a free Euler–Bernoulli beam of length 1

A wind chime constructed of a circular tube may be modelled as a freely vibrating Euler–Bernoulli beam and the dominant frequency in cycles per second is given by:

$$\nu_1 = \frac{\beta_1^2}{2\pi} \sqrt{\frac{EI}{\mu}} = \frac{22.3733}{2 \pi L^2}\sqrt{\frac{EI}{\mu}}$$

where L is the length of the tube, E is the Young's modulus for the tube material, I is the second moment of area of the tube, and μ is the mass per unit length of the tube. Young's modulus E is a constant for a given material. If the inner radius of the tube is r_{i} and the outer radius is r_{o}, then the second moment of area for an axis perpendicular to the axis of the tube is:

$$I=\frac{\pi}{4}(r_o^4-r_i^4)$$

The mass per unit length is:

$$\mu=\pi \rho (r_o^2-r_i^2)$$

where ρ is the density of the tube material. The frequency is then

$$\nu_1=\frac{22.3733}{4\pi L^2}\sqrt{\frac{E}{\rho} }\,\sqrt{r_o^2+r_i^2}$$

which can be rewritten as

$$\nu_1=\frac{22.3733}{4\pi L^2}\sqrt{\frac{E}{2 \rho} }\,\sqrt{D^2+W^2}$$

where W=r_{o}-r_{i} is the wall thickness and D=r_{o}+r_{i} is the average diameter. For sufficiently thin-walled tubes the W^{2} term may be neglected, and for a given material, the main frequency is inversely proportional to L^{2} and proportional to the diameter D.

For the main mode of vibration, there will be two nodes on the tube, where the tube is motionless during the vibration. These nodes will be located at a distance of 22.416% of the length of the tube from each end of the tube. If the tube is simply supported (not clamped) at one or both of these nodes, the tube will vibrate as if these supports did not exist. A wind chime will give the clearest and loudest tone when it is hung using one of these node points as the attachment point. These attachment points are also the same as used by other similar instruments such as the xylophone and glockenspiel.

== Use in music ==
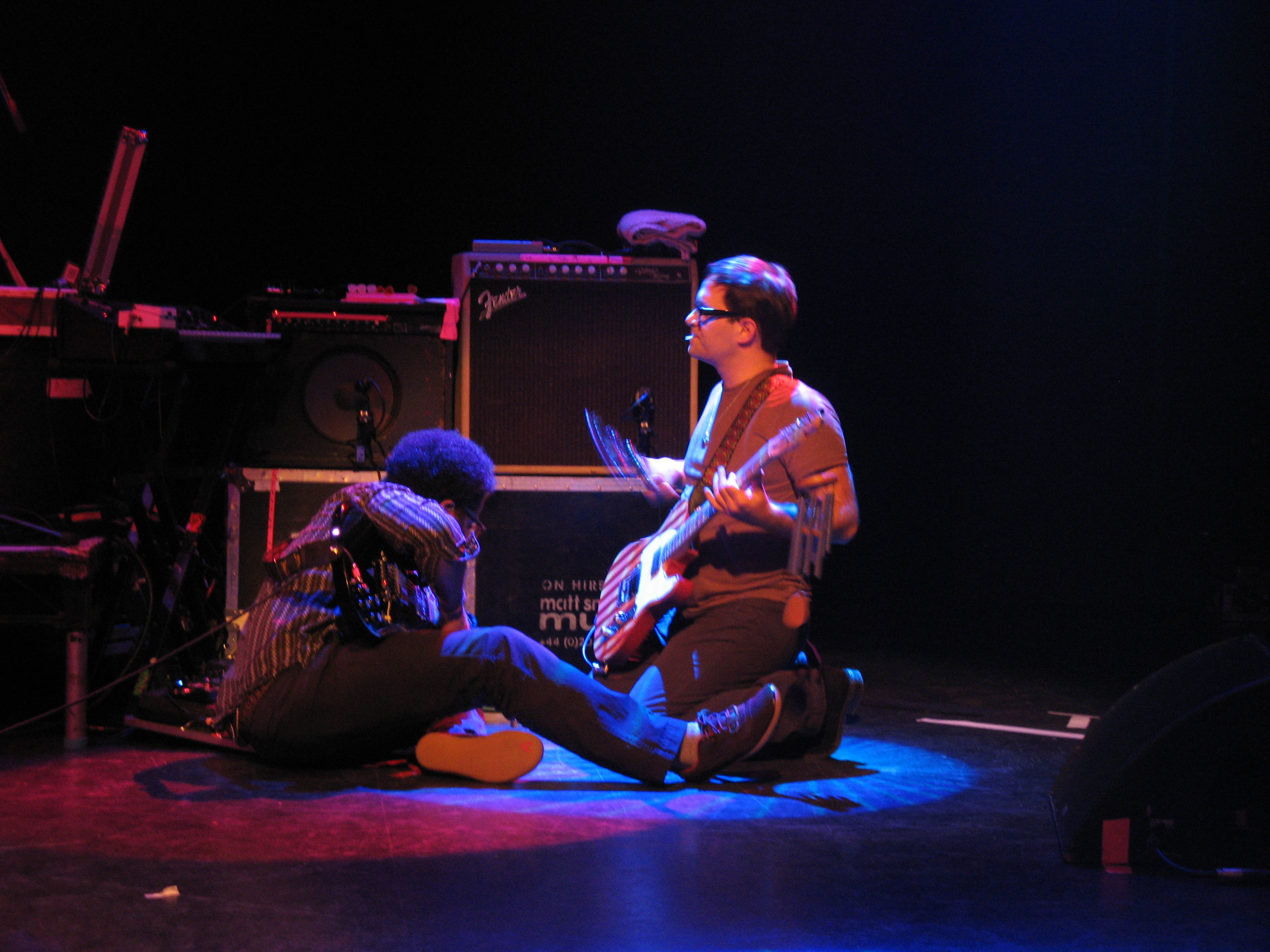
David Sitek with a wind chime suspended from his guitar

Different types of wind chimes have also been used in modern music and are listed as a percussion instrument. The following is a brief list of artists and composers who have used them:

- Olivier Messiaen: Saint-François d'Assise (one set of glass, shell and wood chimes)
- Toshiro Mayuzumi: Bugaku (one set of wood and glass chimes)
- Giles Swayne Symphony No. 1 (one set of glass chimes)
- David Sitek, of American rock band TV on the Radio, sometimes hangs a wind chime from the end of his guitar to add texture to his music.
- Koji Kondo, head composer for the Mario series of video games. A prime example is the theme music for the world "Vanilla Dome" in Super Mario World.
- Ivy Queen, on the acoustic track "Ángel Caído" from the 2004 album Real.

== Influence ==
- The Japanese video game franchise Pokémon used the Japanese fūrin wind chimes as the basis for the Pokémon Chimecho. Its in-game cry reflects this, as it sounds like three high-pitched bells chiming one after the other.
- Mark trees are often mistakenly called wind chimes, but they are different instruments, though with a basic similar structure consisting of tubes of differing lengths that are meant to produce a tinkling or chiming sound.

== Gallery ==
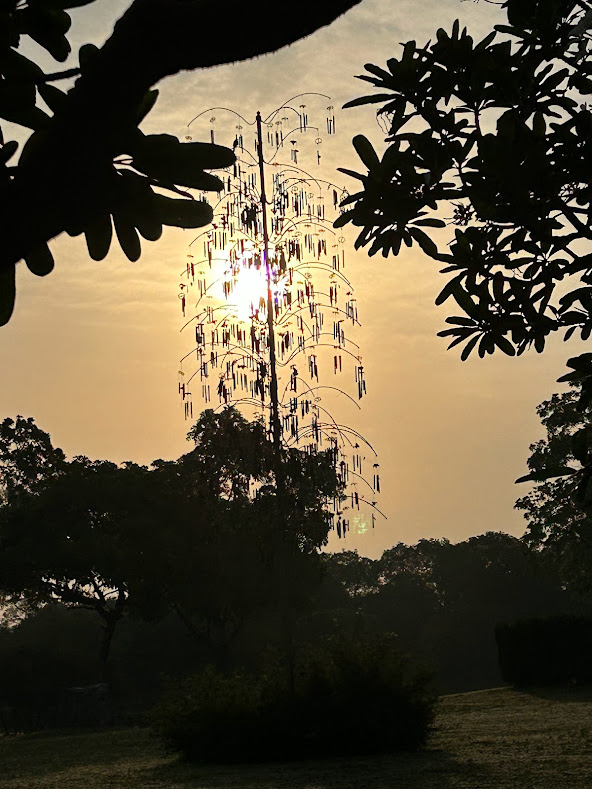
Wind chimes at Leisure Valley, Chandigarh

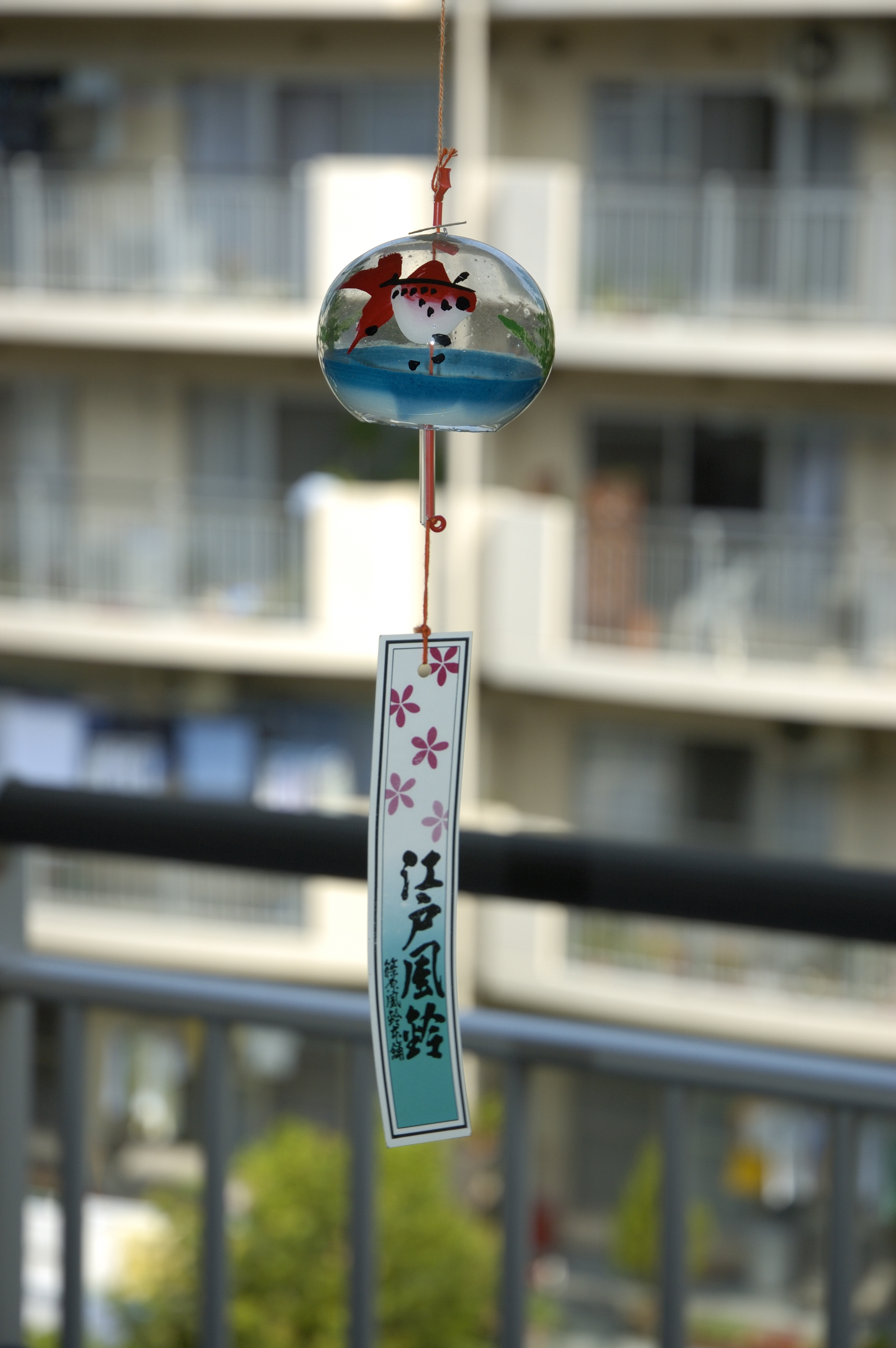
A Japanese Fūrin wind chime

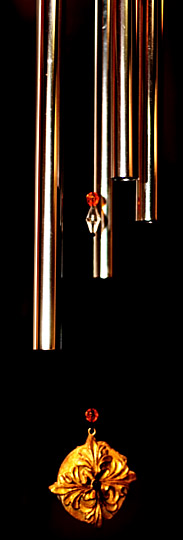
A set of small wind chimes

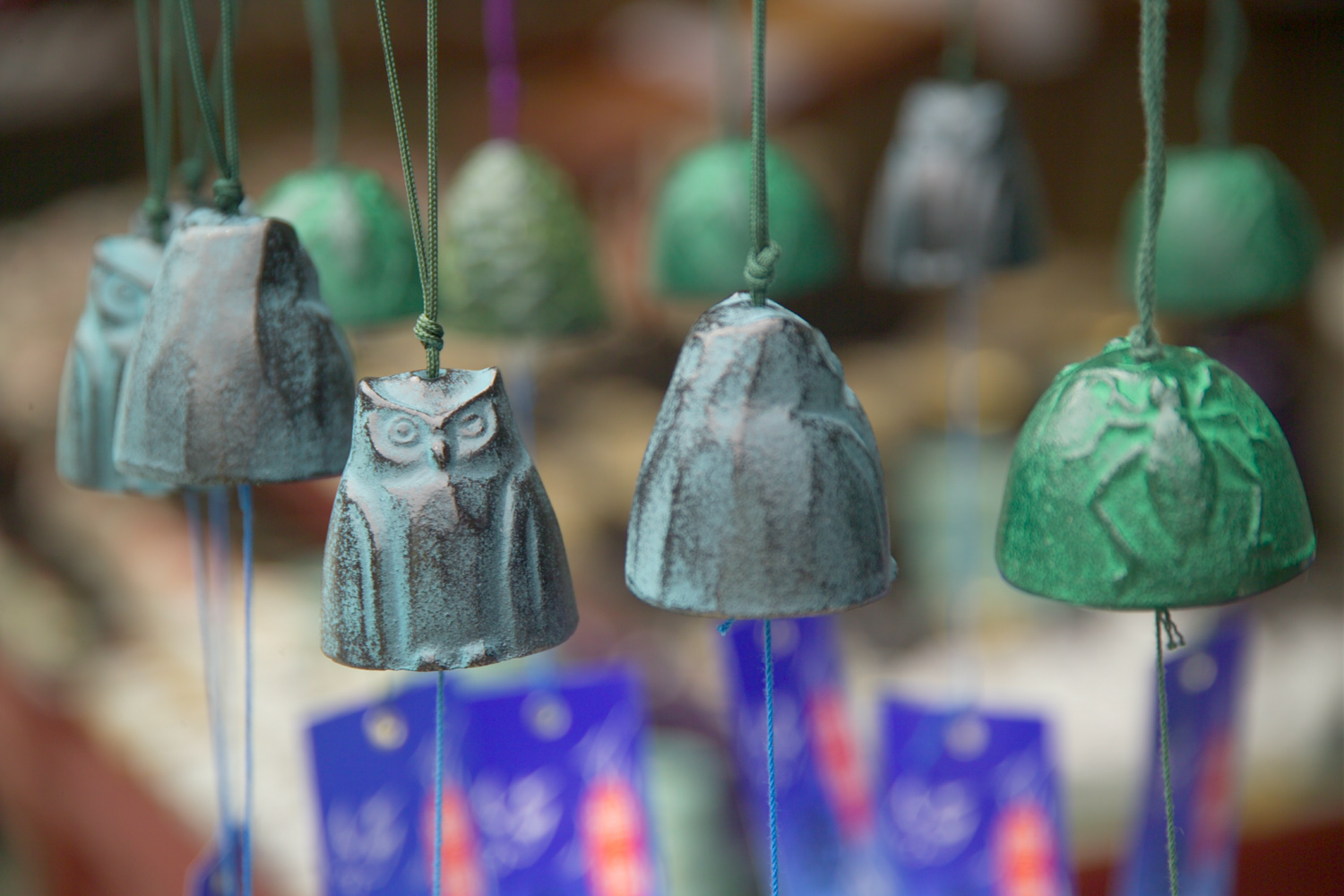
Wind chimes in Nagano, Japan

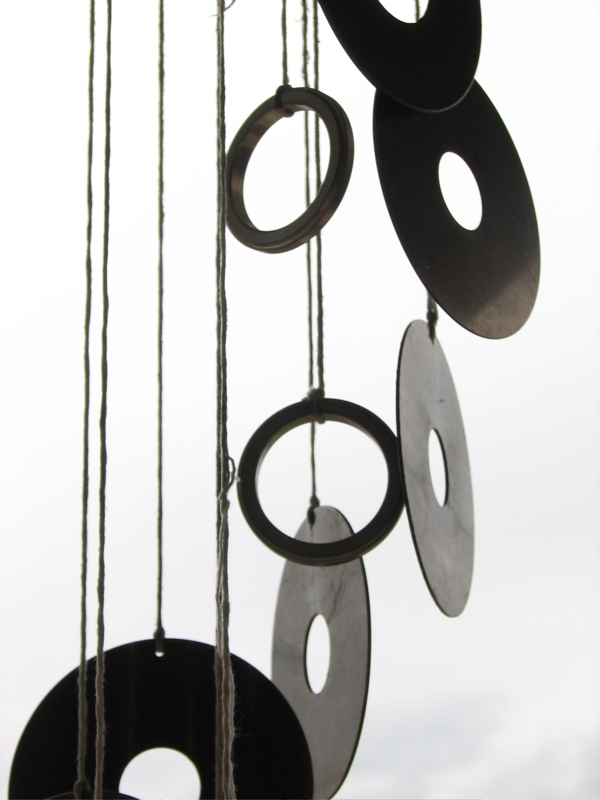
Old hard disk platters used as a wind chime

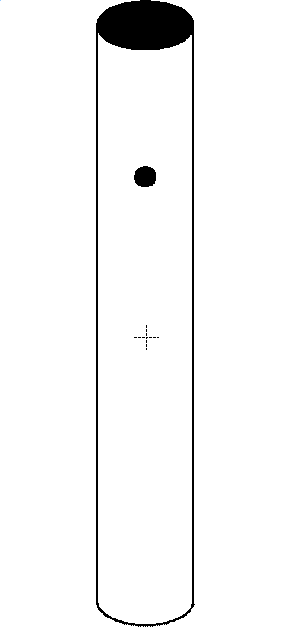
Quality chimes are hung at ≈2/9 and struck at 1/2 length.

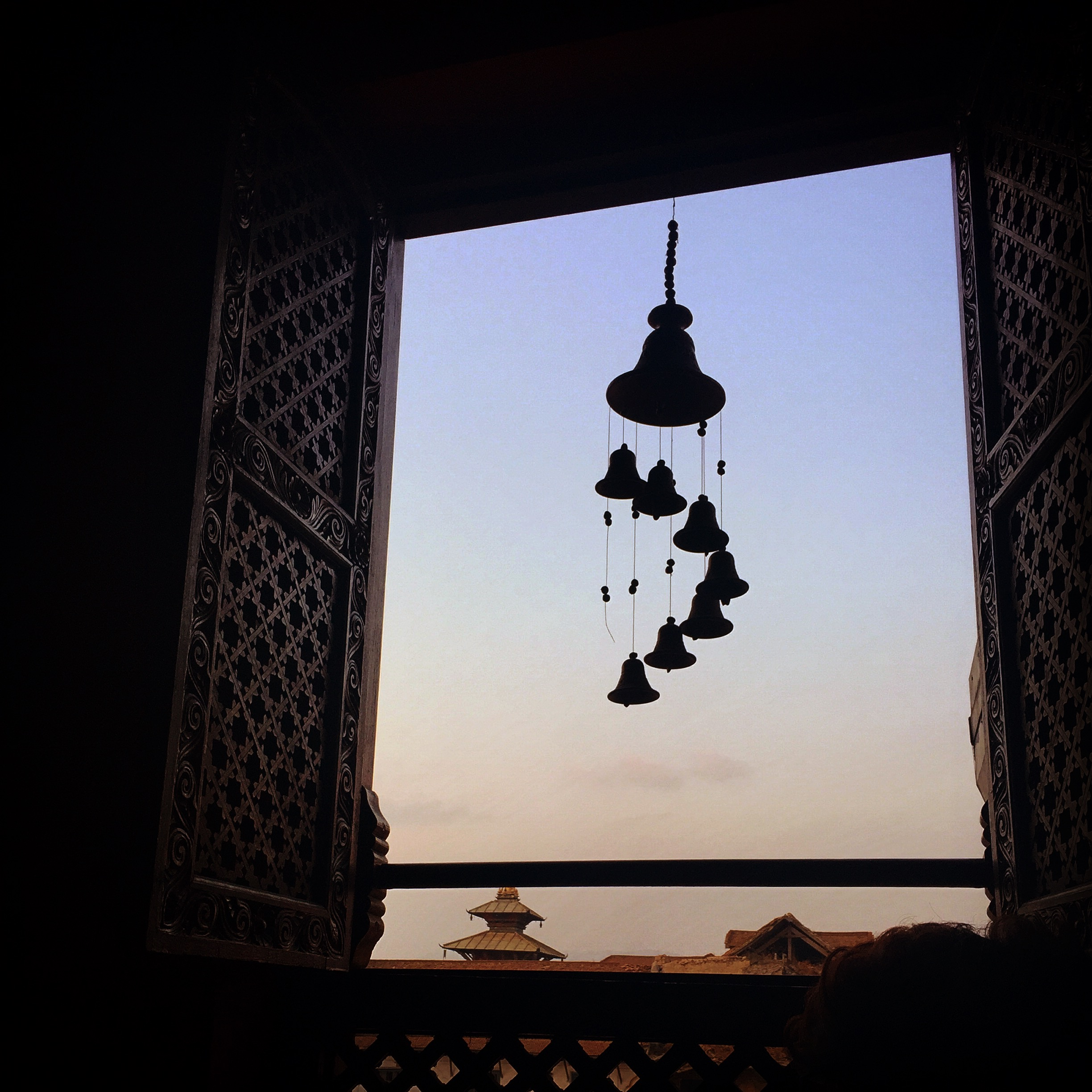
Mate Ghanta bells from Nepal

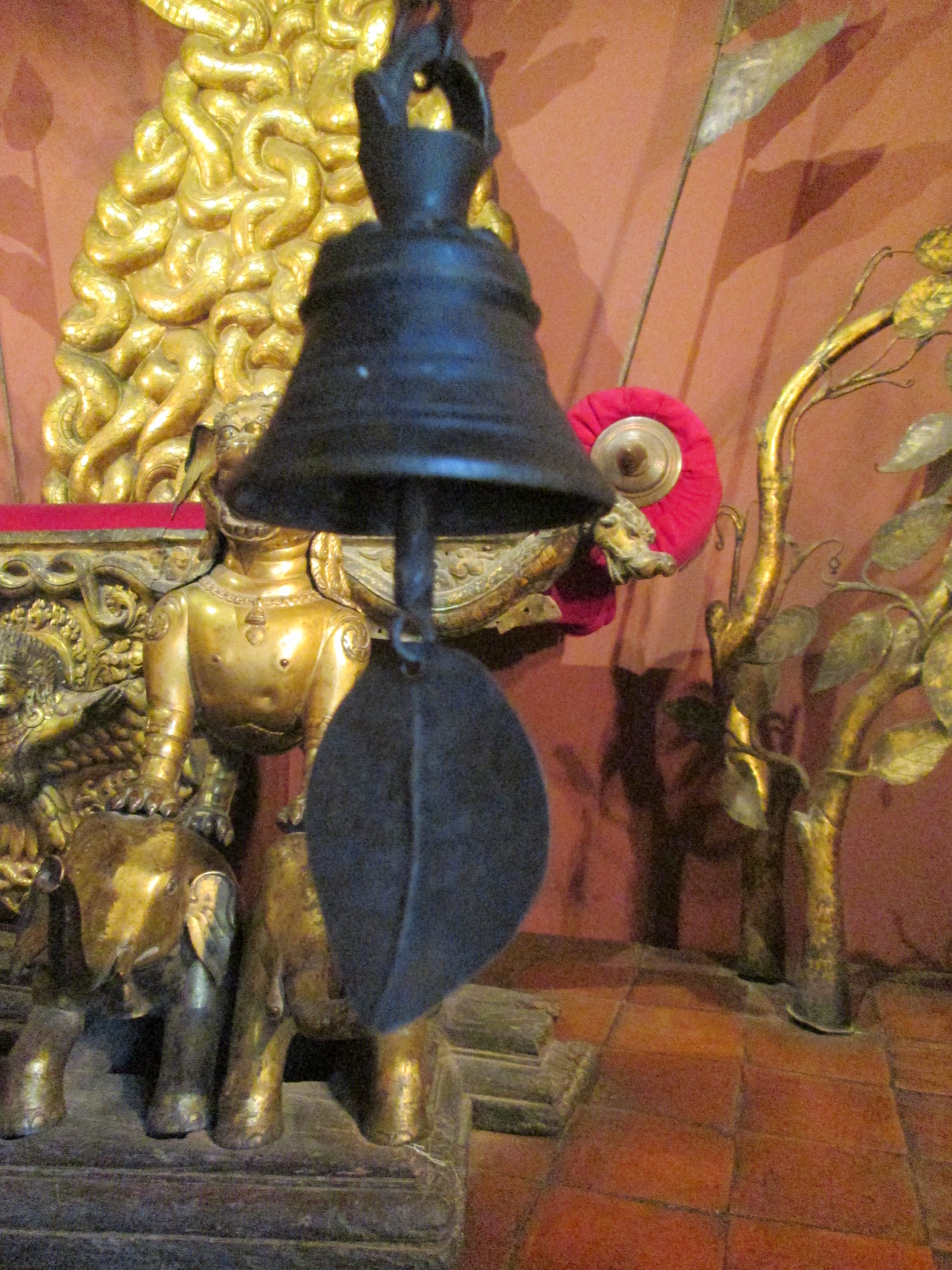
Phye Ghan (Nepali: फ्ये गँ:)

== See also ==
- Dreamcatcher
- Mobile (sculpture)
- Suncatcher
- World's Largest Tuned Musical Windchime
- World's largest windchime
