= Suncatcher =

Ornament designed to reflect, refract, or iridesce in sunlight

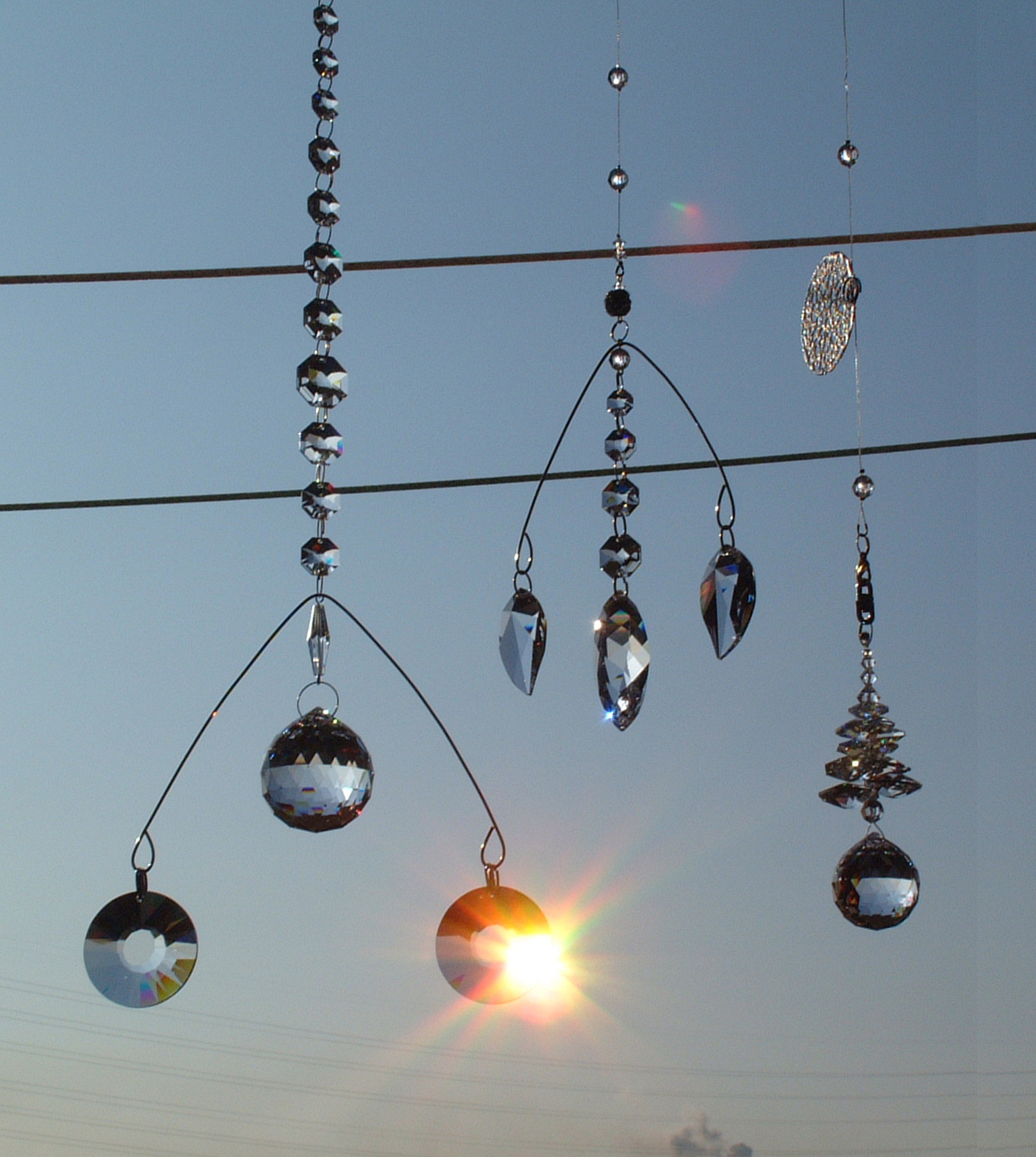
Some suncatchers.

A suncatcher or light catcher is a small reflective, refractive, and/or iridescent ornament. It may include glass or nacre pieces and be hung indoors near a window to "catch" sunlight.

A suncatcher is like the optical equivalent of a wind chime. Some designs are simple and abstract with perhaps some mobile-like chained elements, while more complex designs often evoke flora or fauna. Many designs combine suncatchers with wind chimes.

Suncatchers may be mass-produced or handmade, and vary in simplicity of design from an arts-and-crafts project to a professionally handmade glass sculpture.

== See also ==
- Dreamcatcher
- Stained glass
- Sundial
