= World's largest windchime =

Roadside attraction in Illinois, US

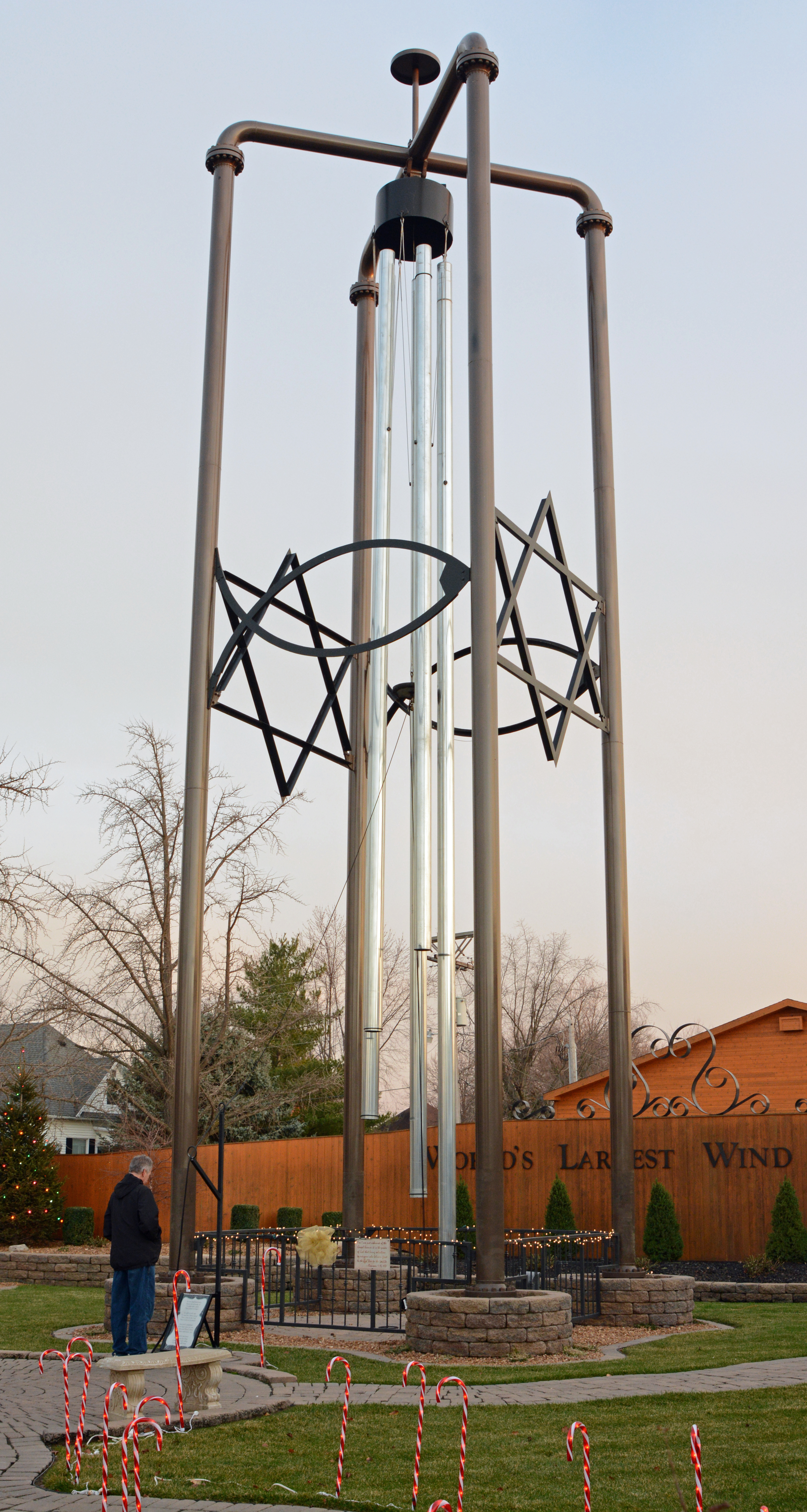
The windchime in 2015

The world's largest windchime was made by Jim Bolin and is located at 109 East Main Street, Casey, Illinois. The windchime was entered into the Guinness World Records as the Largest Windchime on June 22, 2012. The windchime measures 12.80 m (42 ft) long and consists of five metal tubes which are suspended 14.94 m (49 ft) from the ground. The windchime weighs a total of 7.6804 t (16932.4 lb).

== Construction ==
Jim Bolin is the co-owner of family-owned Bolin Enterprises, Inc. (BEI), a pipeline and tank maintenance firm. Bolin, along with BEI welders and fabricators, spent two years designing, planning, and fabricating the windchime. Once completed, the windchime was moved to BEI-owned land at 109 East Main Street, Casey, Illinois and built up as a tourist attraction.

== See also ==
- World's Largest Tuned Musical Windchime
