= Fūrin =

Japanese wind chimes

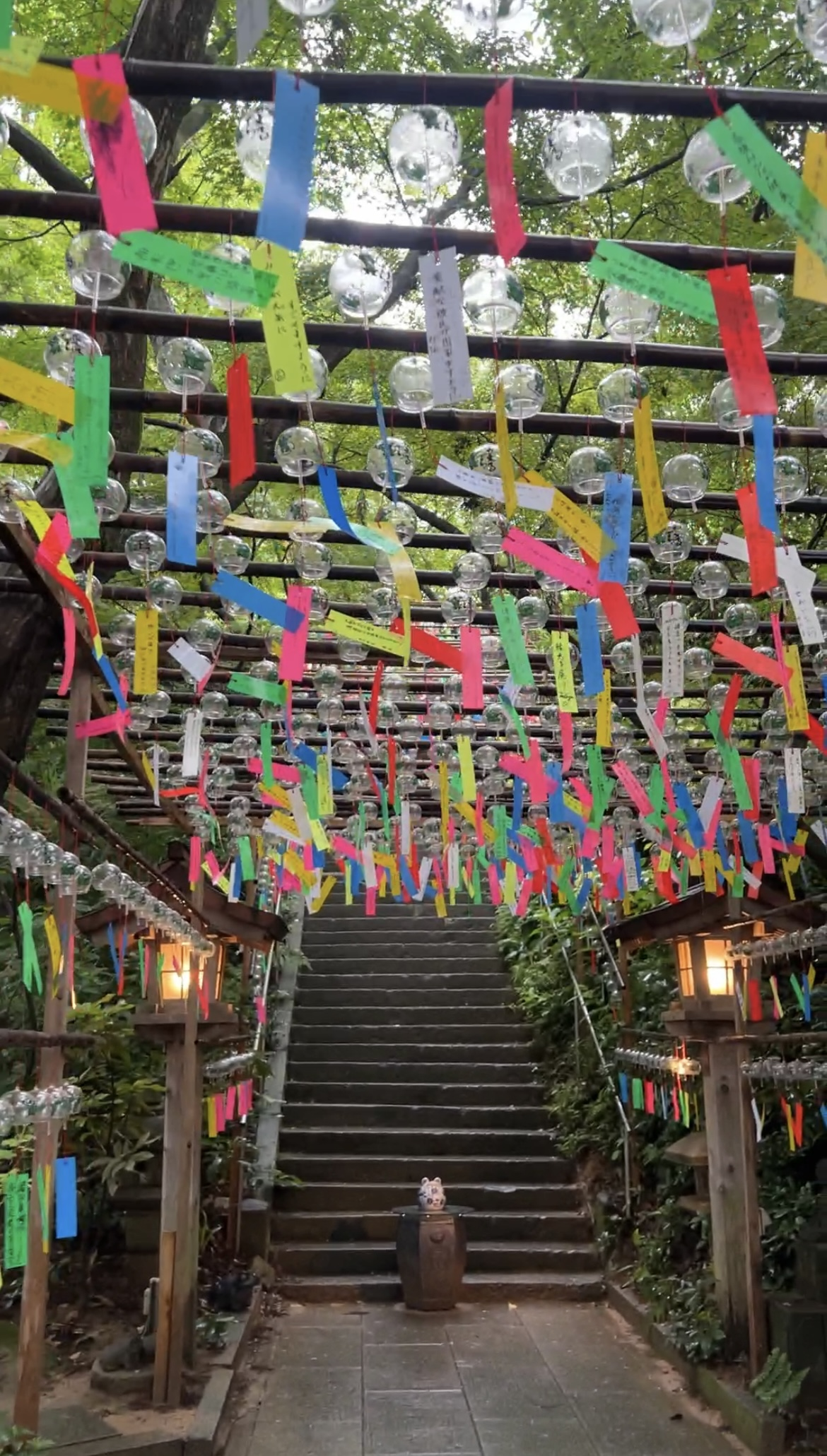
Many fūrin at Nyoirin-ji with colorful tanzaku paper

A fūrin (風鈴, ふうりん, lit. 'wind-bell') is a small, bowl-shaped Japanese wind chime typically hung during the summer. A piece of paper called tanzaku (短冊) is usually hung from each fūrin to cause it to ring even with just a slight breeze. The sound of the fūrin and the sight of the paper blowing in the wind are seen by many Japanese people as having a cooling effect during the hot Japanese summer.

Sound of fūrin in a slight breeze

== History ==
The origins of fūrin are believed to be from the Chinese Tang Dynasty when metal wind chimes were hung in bamboo forests and used to tell fortunes. The word fūrin was first used in Japan during the Heian period when they were hung from eaves, particularly at Buddhist temples, as talismans to ward off evil spirits. They can still be found at many shrines and temples in Japan.

Glass fūrin were first made during the late Edo period. Glass is the most popular material used for fūrin in modern Japan and these glass fūrin are referred to as Edo Fūrin (江戸風鈴). It was also during the Edo period that fūrin were first seen to have cooling properties during the Japanese summer. It is this perceived effect that makes fūrin a summer fūbutsushi (風物詩), or an item characteristic of a certain Japanese season.

During the Edo period, these fūrin, which were made by free glassblowing, were very expensive and primarily used by feudal lords and wealthy merchants. Mass-produced glass fūrin in modern Japan have made them affordable and widespread at Japanese households, but the tradition of free-blowing glass to make fūrin is still practiced by some craftsmen in Japan. Fūrin made from metal and other materials can also still be found throughout Japan.

== Fūrin events ==
During summer in Japan, various events are held throughout the country in which many, sometimes thousands, of fūrin are hung. These fūrin displays, often at temples or shrines, are popular seasonal attractions. Notable events include:

- Mizusawa Station, Ōshū, Iwate Prefecture – During summer hundreds of fūrin are displayed at the platform of Mizusawa Station. The sound of these fūrin was chosen as one of the 100 Soundscapes of Japan.
- Kawasaki Daishi Fūrin Market – A summer market at Kawasaki Daishi Temple in Kawasaki, Kanagawa Prefecture, which sells thousands of fūrin from across Japan.
- Kawagoe Hikawa Shrine – about 1,500 fūrin decorate Hikawa Shrine in Kawagoe, Saitama Prefecture, during summer.

Fūrin at Yunogo Onsen

== Gallery ==
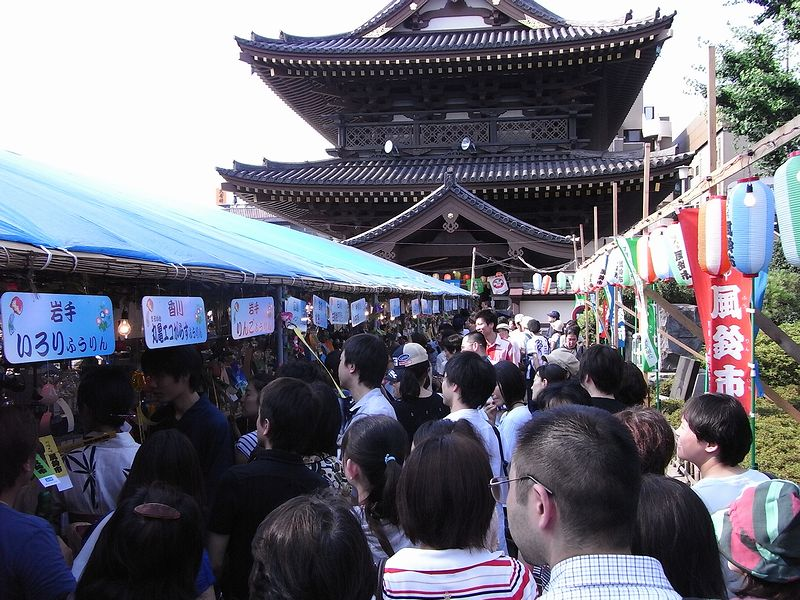
Kawasaki Daishi Fūrin Market

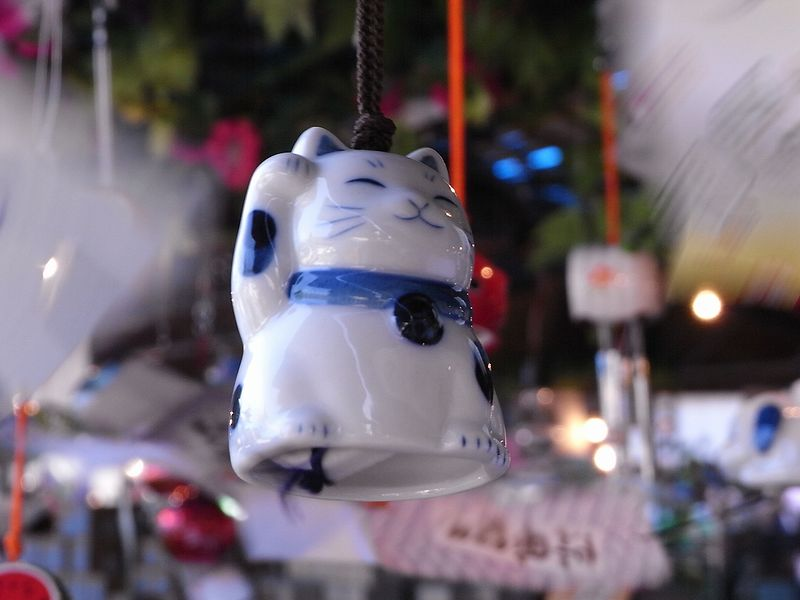
Fūrin in the shape of a maneki-neko

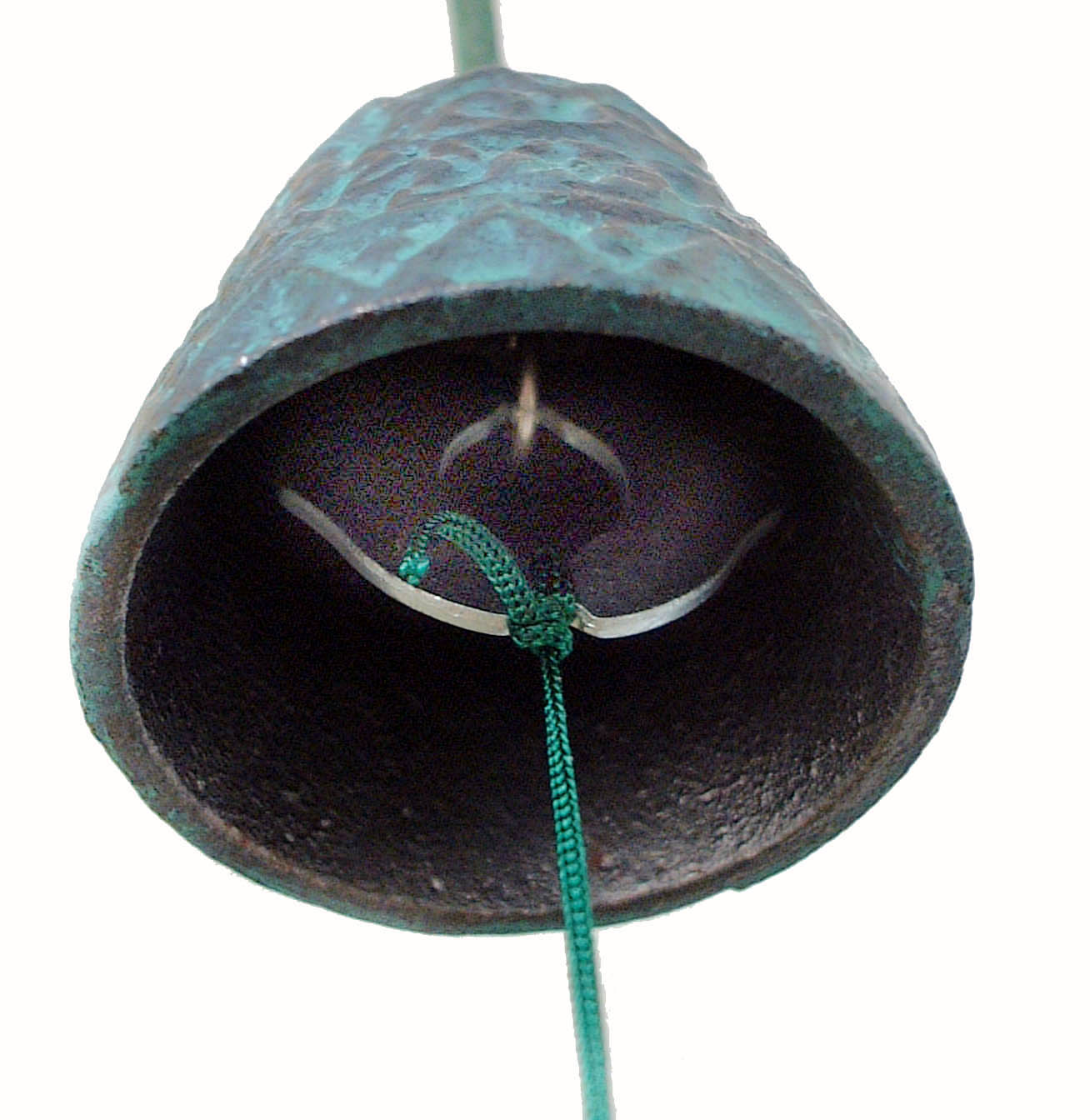
The inside of a fūrin

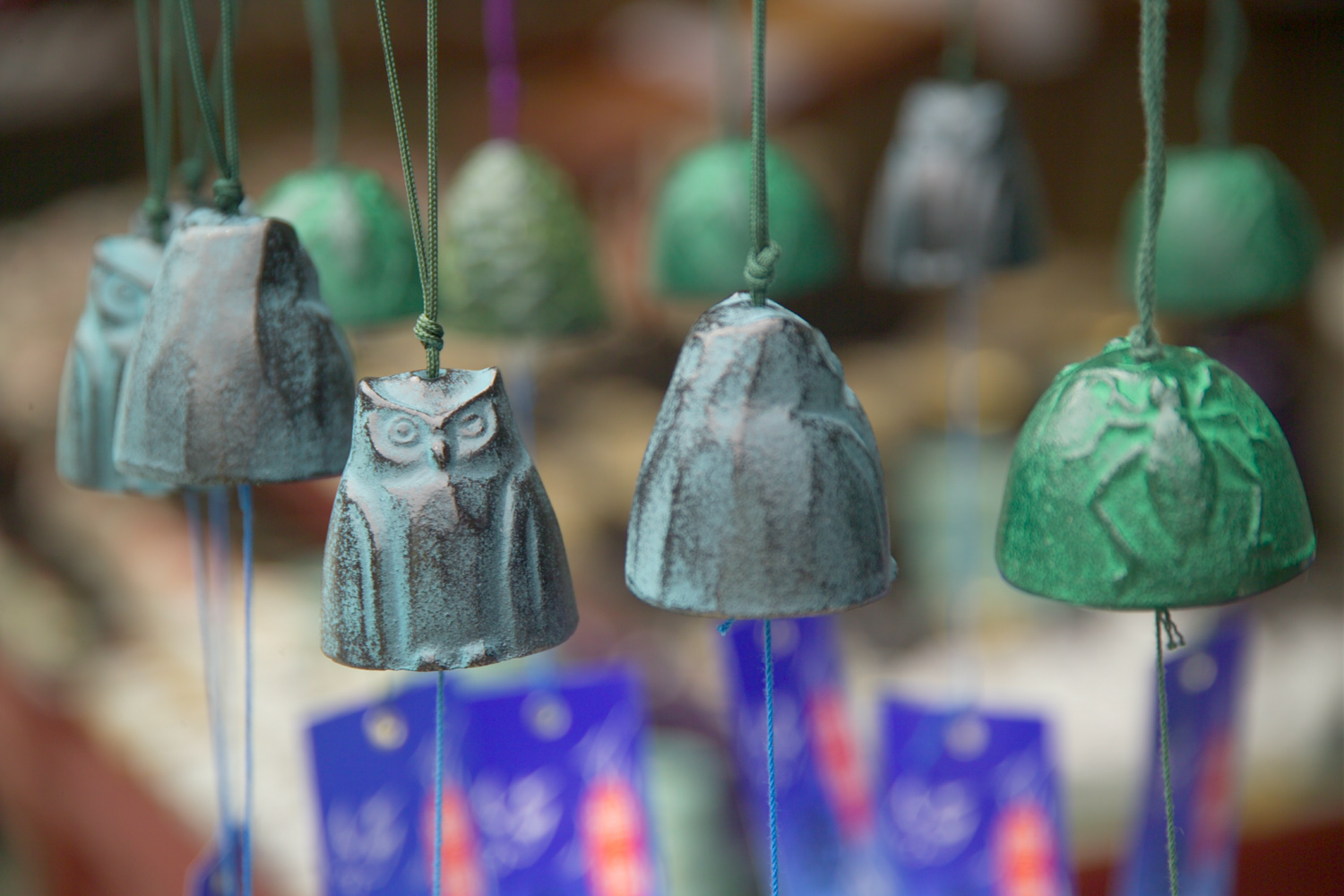
Metal fūrin for sale

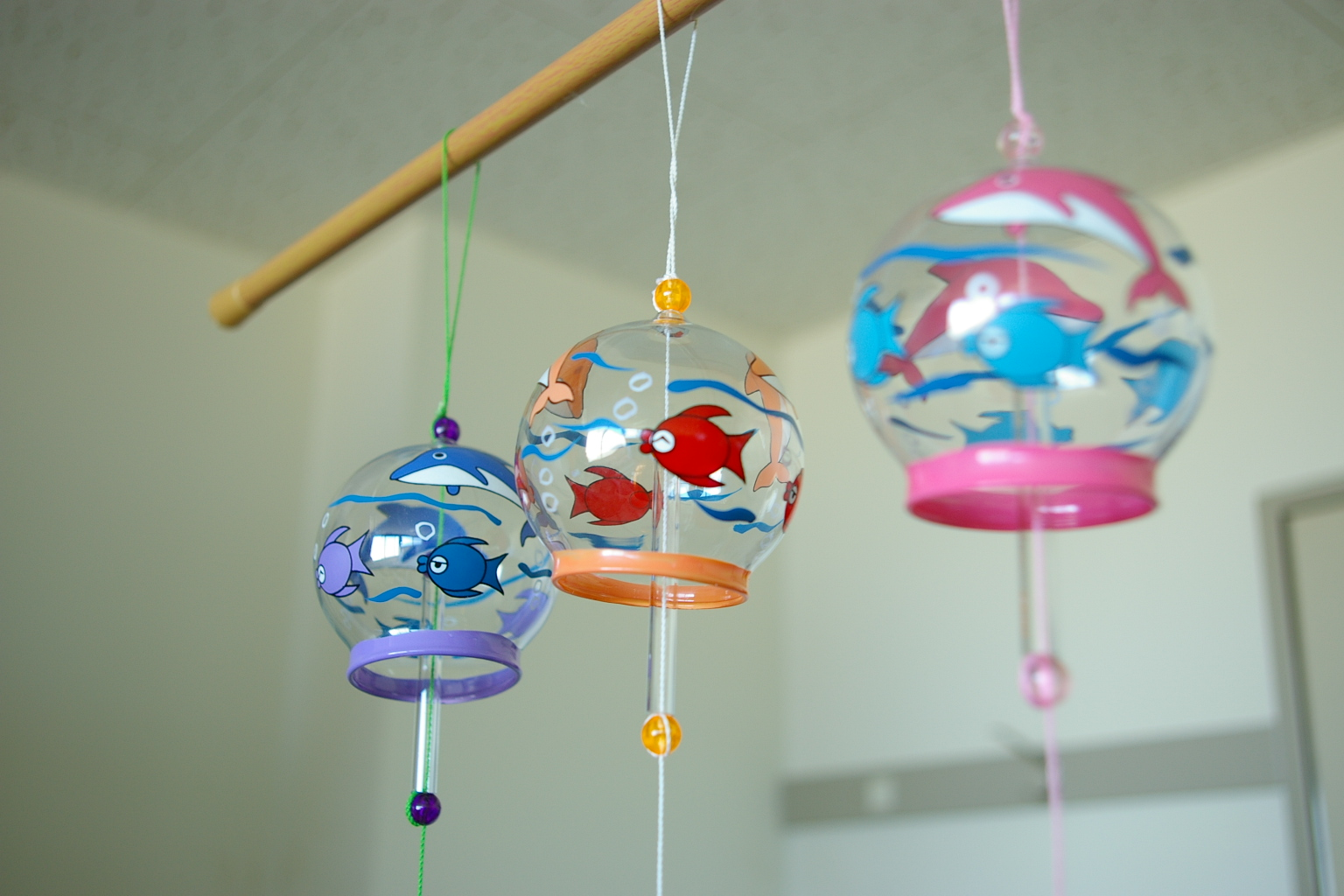
Glass fūrin
