= Hikawa Shrine (Kawagoe) =

Shinto shrine

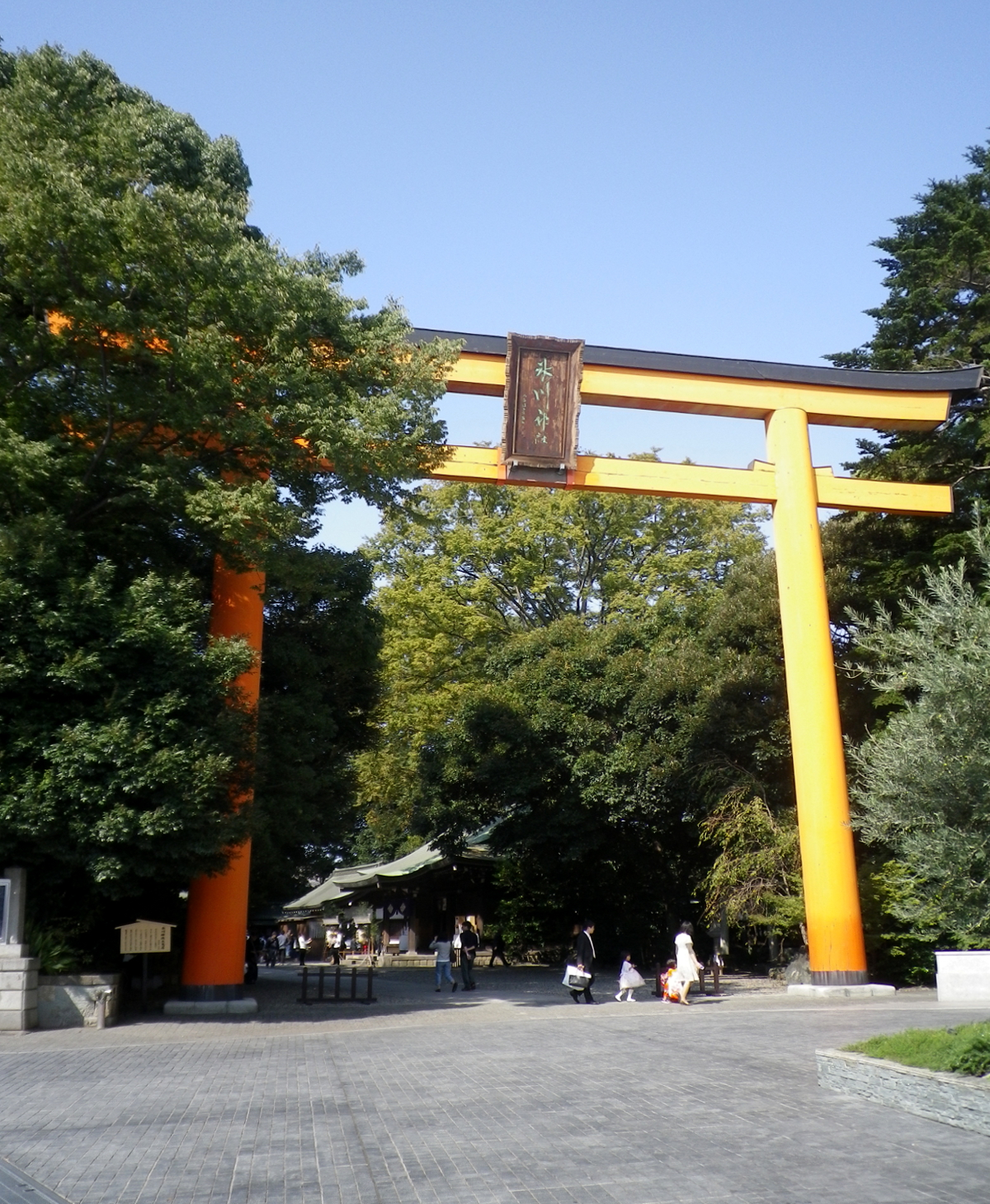

- Location within Japan

Religion
- Affiliation: Shinto

Location
- Interactive map of Hikawa Shrine
- Coordinates: 35.927586°N 139.488532°E

Hikawa Shrine (氷川神社) is a Shinto shrine in Kawagoe, Saitama Prefecture, Japan. In order to separate it from Hikawa Shrine in Omiya Ward, Saitama City, it is often called Kawagoe Hikawa Shrine. Hikawa Shrine is known for its Reitaisai, or a festival considered the origin of Kawagoe festival, which was registered as a National Important Intangible Folk Cultural Property and listed as a UNESCO Intangible Cultural Heritage. It's also well known for its "corridor of windchiimes".

== History ==
Hikawa Shrine was founded during the reign of Emperor Kinmei, in 541. The shrine had an influential parishioner's group with various subordinate priests.

Since 1457, when Kawagoe Castle was built by Ota Doshin, Ota Dokan (father and son), the shrine had been worshipped by the successive lords of Kawagoe Domain as the genius of the castle town Kawagoe. The main building of the shrine has elaborate carvings, which was donated by Matsudaira Naritsune, the lord of Kawagoe Domain in 1849. It was designated as an important cultural asset of Saitama.

The torii gate measuring 15 meters high is one of the tallest wooden torii gates in Japan, and has a framed symbol with writings from Katsu Kaishu. The shrine enshrines the god of married couples, so it has been worshipped as the ‘God of Marriage’.

== Shinto belief ==
This Shrine is dedicated to the spirits of 5 gods, Susanoo-no-Mikoto, his wife Kushinadahime, and Onamuchino-mikoto, their son. Kushinadahime's parents Ashinaduchi no mikoto and Tenaduchi no mikoto are also enshrined there. Since these gods are family, including two couples, people worship at Hikawa shrine for good fortune in marriage and family.

== Events ==
Pray for good match: held at 8:08 on the 8th and on the 4th Saturday of each month. (8 is considered a lucky number after its shape in Chinese character)

Reitaisai: held on October 14, the biggest festival of the shrine. Float event held immediately after Reitaisai is the famous Kawagoe Festival, which is designated as a National Important Intangible Folk Cultural Property and listed as the UNESCO Intangible Cultural Heritage.

Kawagoe Festival: held on the 3rd weekend of October, in which elaborately decorated floats parade throughout the castle town Kawagoe.

Great Purification: held on July 31 and December 31 to purify ourselves of daily uncleanness.

Wind Chime Festival: held during the months of July, August and September, thousands of wind chimes called fūrin with one's wishes written on wooden plaques are displayed.
