= World's Largest Tuned Musical Windchime =

Attraction in Arkansas, US

Coordinates: 36.3754°N 93.7484°W

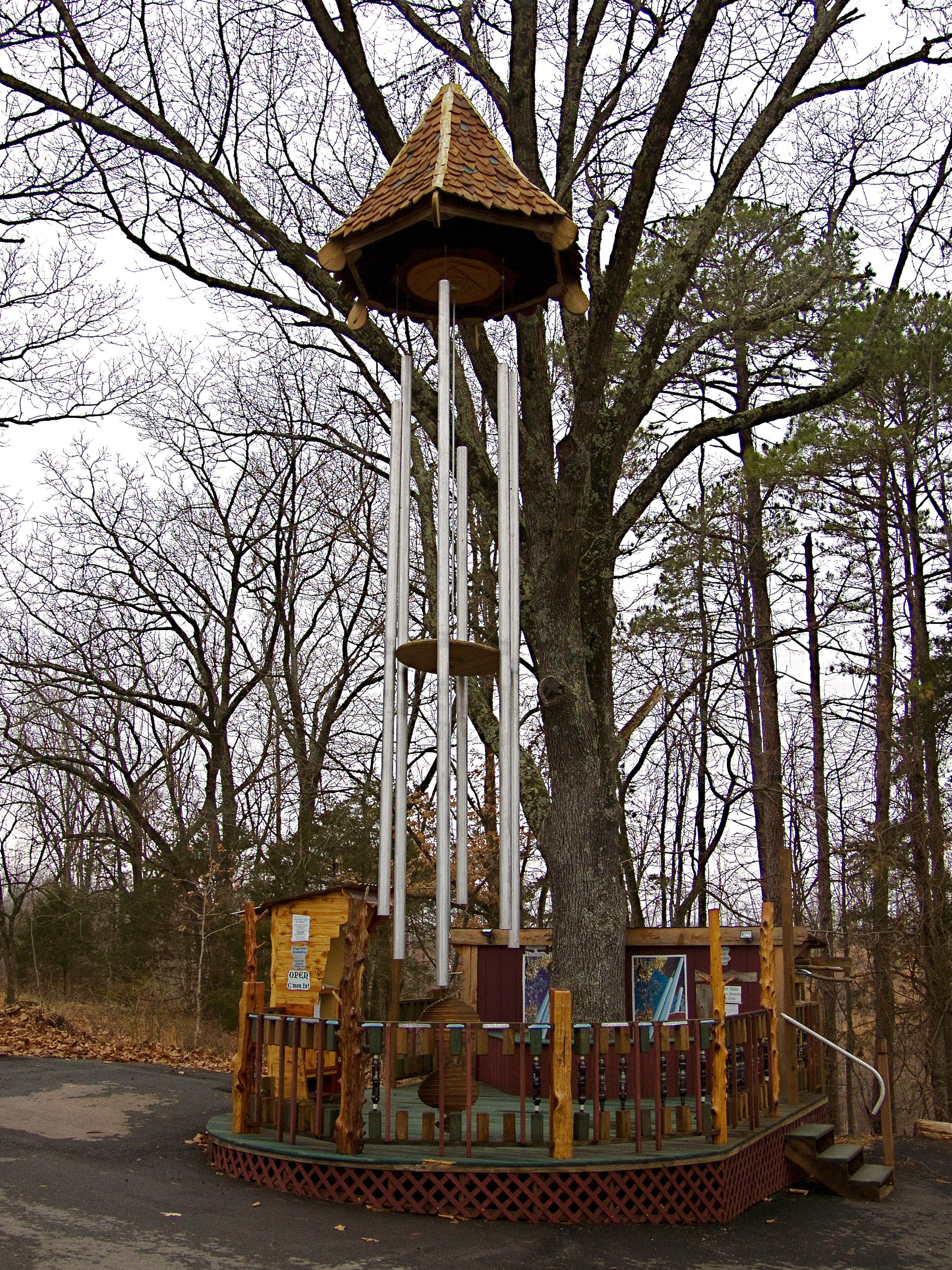
The World's Largest Tuned Musical Windchime

The World's Largest Tuned Musical Windchime was erected by windchime artist, Ranaga Farbiarz, in the parking area of Celestial Windz Harmonic Bizaar, south of Eureka Springs, Arkansas on Thursday, November 4, 2004.

== Construction ==
With the help of a bucket truck, a 100-foot (30 m) tall oak tree, his son David, and numerous friends, the chime was erected on site from prepared components in front of approximately 100 onlookers. The chime is dedicated to Ranaga's late father, Ignatz Farbiarz, a Holocaust Survivor.

The six metal pipes are tuned in an Oriental pentatonic scale, like the black keys on a piano, with the longest and shortest tubes emitting notes an octave apart. The deepest toned tube is 20 feet (6.1 m) long and "sounds like a combination Cathedral Bell, Tibetan Singing Bowl and Jet engine." The shortest is 14 feet (4.3 m) and has a rich Cathedral-like sound. The overall length of the chime is 35 feet 10 inches (10.92 m), easily beating the previous record of 16 feet 8 inches (5.08 m)

The instrument is made from four-inch (102 mm) diameter, thick-walled aluminum tubing. The total weight of the chime is 653 pounds with the musical tubing alone weighing 310 pounds. The 6-foot (1.8 m) by 8-foot (2.4 m) wooden pyramidal shaped top weighs 225 pounds. The center hung circular wood knocker is 3' 6" in diameter and weighs 64 pounds. A 4-foot (1.2 m) long by 2-foot (0.61 m) wide Celestial Wind Dervish which Ranaga makes out of recycled local and imported woods is used as the windcatcher and weighs 18 pounds. The down rods and miscellaneous hardware weigh 36 pounds. Ranaga calls it the "Wind Chime of Mass Distraction" (WMD) because it is made with the same size and grade aluminum sought by the weapons inspectors in Iraq.

Farbiarz was notified via a formal letter, dated Feb. 9th 2006, from the Guinness World Records Management Team. The letter conveyed the Guinness Team's congratulations upon Farbiarz's achievement of the world record of the largest set of windchimes, and was accompanied by a certificate of commemoration.

== See also ==
- World's largest windchime
