= Stabile =

Stabile may refer to:

== Art ==
- Stabile (sculpture), a static abstract sculpture

== People ==
Stabile is a surname derived from the medieval personal name Stabile (from Latin stabilis) and is mainly found among people from southern Italy. Notable people with the surname include:

- Annibale Stabile (1535–1595), Italian composer of the Roman School
- Benedict L. Stabile (1927-2014), United States Coast Guard officer
- Eliana Stábile (born 1993), Argentine footballer
- Giacomo Stabile (born 2005), Italian footballer
- Giulia Stabile (born 2002), Spanish-Italian dancer and television presenter
- Guillermo Stábile (1905–1966), Argentine footballer and coach
- Mariano Stabile (1888–1968), Italian baritone
- Meghan Stabile (1982–2022), American jazz promoter, producer and organizer
- Nick Stabile (born 1971), American actor

== Institutions ==
- Banca Stabile, an Italian immigrant bank in New York City (1885–1933)
