= Water scoop (hydropower) =

Simple seesawing hydropower machine

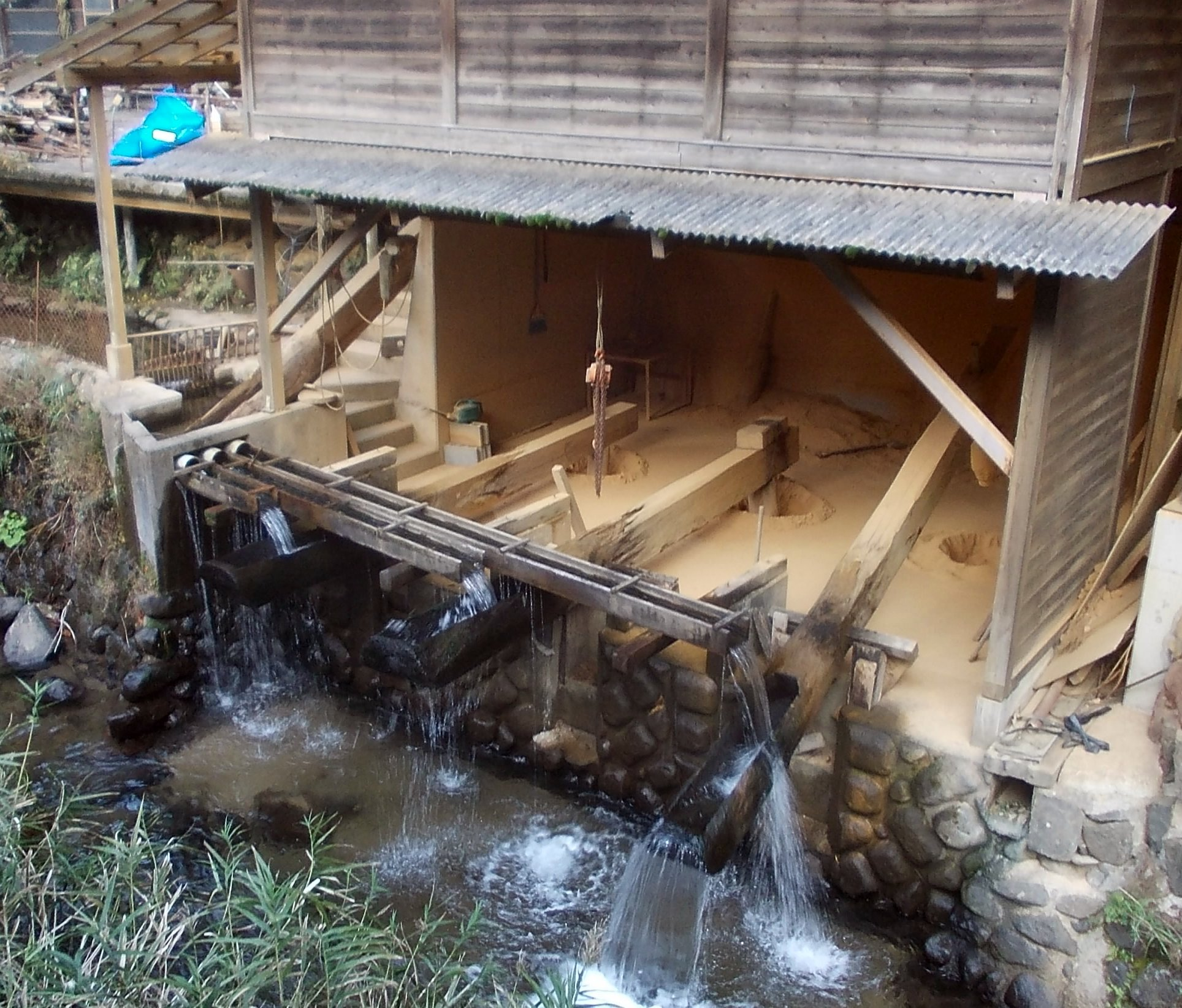
Water scoop or mill, used for the production of Onta ware in the village of Onta in Ōita Prefecture, Japan

A water scoop is a simple hydropower machine – that is, a machine used to extract power from the flow of water. Unlike a water wheel it operates intermittently, like a seesaw: A container (a bucket or cup) at the end of a lever is filled with water in the upper position. The container side becomes heavier, and so the lever with the filled container moves downward, which may be used to operate a machine drive. In the lower position the container is emptied, and the lever moves back into the upward position.

Because of their inferior efficiency compared to a water mill, water scoops are less common, and have been used in the past mostly for applications where linear motion is required rather than rotation, for example hammers in smitheries, saws in sawmills, and stamp mills in mining. They are also used for fulling and, nowadays, to operate animated sculptures in fountains.

== Monjolo ==
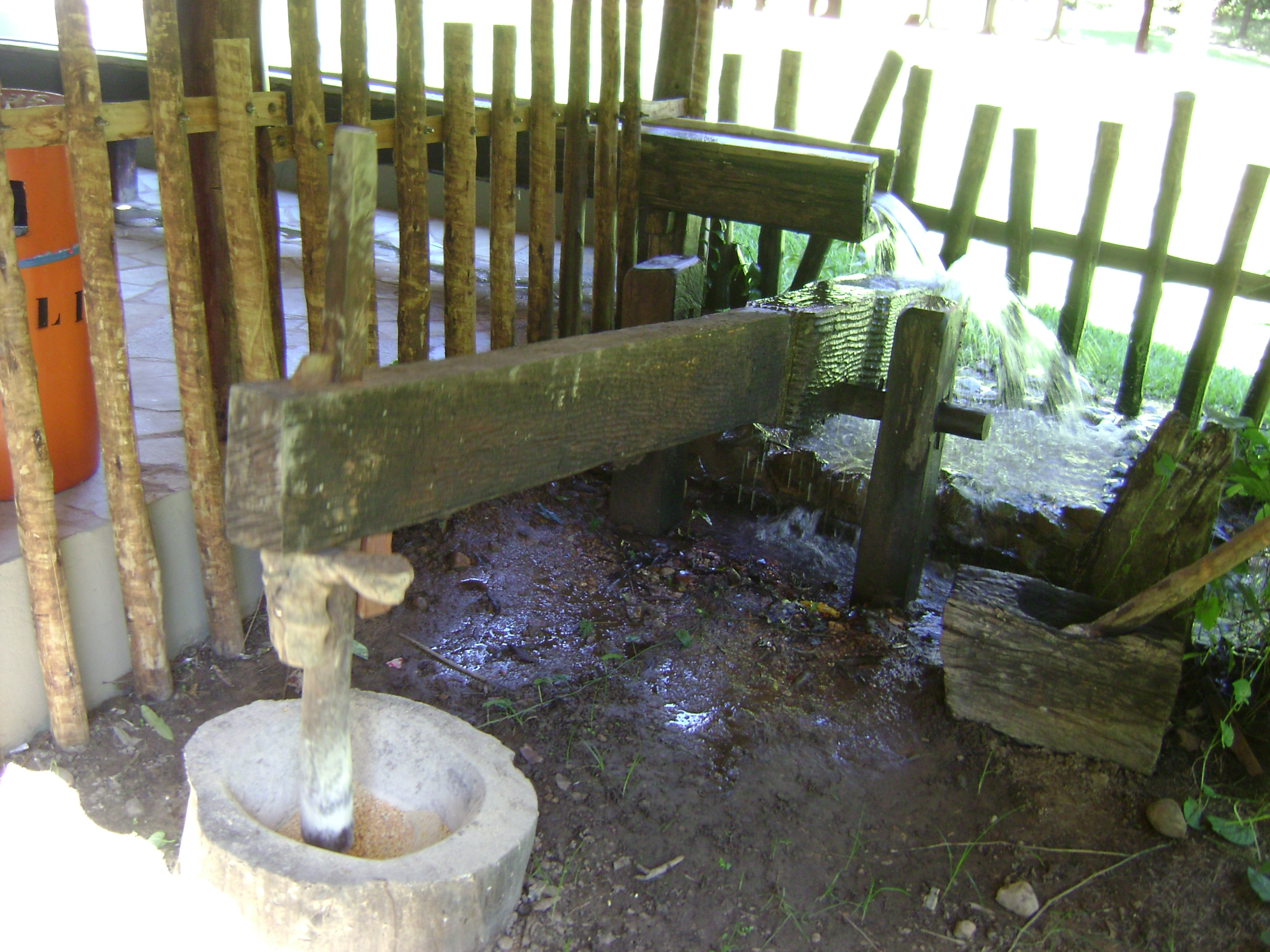
Monjolo in Caldas Novas, Goiás

A monjolo is a type of water scoop used for the processing and grinding of grains and introduced in Brazil by the Portuguese during the colonial period. It can be used to peel and grind dry beans, resulting in a thicker flour.

It is formed by a wooden beam suspended so that the part that supports the pestle is larger than the other, which ends with a trough. A spout fills the trough with the water, thus raising the pestle. When the trough is full, it lowers the trough, and when the trough spills the water, the beam falls, causing the pestle to hit the mortar. As such, the monjolo is an important tool for agricultural facilitation. It is common for rural people to seek to live near a river or stream as a source of water. The monjolo is considered one of the most useful machines for planters of multiple crops.

== See also ==
- Pestle
- Shishi-odoshi
- Trip hammer
- Water mill
- Water wheel
