= Nishitetsu 8000 series =

Japanese train type

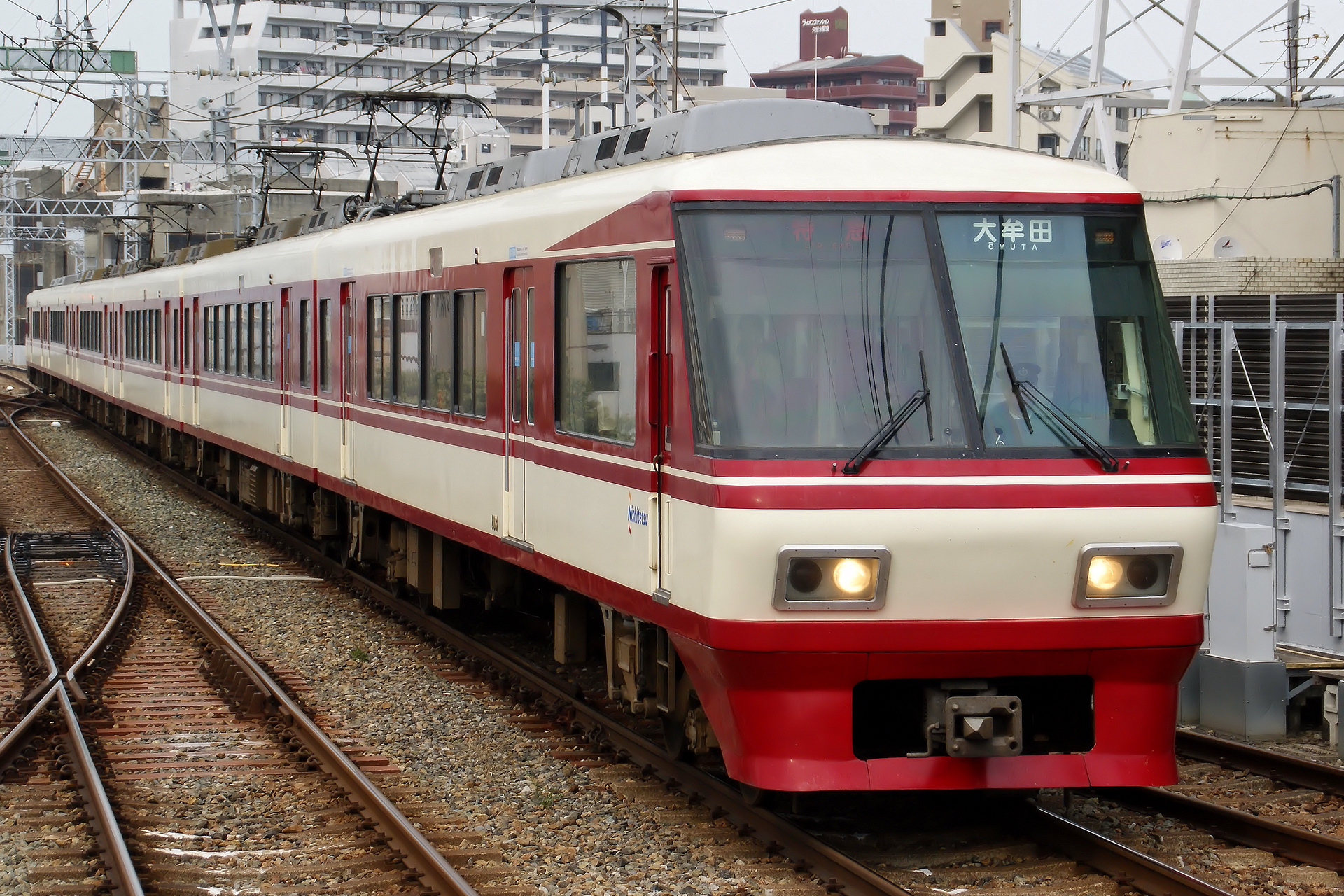
- An 8000 series set in April 2011
- In service: March 1989 – October 2017
- Manufacturer: Kawasaki Heavy Industries
- Constructed: 1989
- Entered service: 10 March 1989
- Number built: 36 vehicles (6 sets)
- Number in service: None
- Number preserved: None
- Number scrapped: 36 vehicles (6 sets)
- Formation: 6 cars per trainset
- Fleet numbers: 8011 – 8061
- Operator: Nishi-Nippon Railroad
- Depot: Chikushi
- Lines served: Nishitetsu Tenjin Ōmuta Line; Dazaifu Line

Specifications
- Car body construction: Steel
- Car length: 19,500 mm (64 ft 0 in)
- Width: 2,716 mm (8 ft 10.9 in)
- Height: 4,170 mm (13 ft 8 in)
- Doors: 2 pairs per side
- Maximum speed: 110 km/h (70 mph)
- Traction system: Resistor control
- Acceleration: 2.5 km/h/s
- Deceleration: 3.5 km/h/s (service brake); 4.0 km/h/s (emergency brake)
- Electric systems: 1,500 V DC overhead catenary
- Current collection: Pantograph
- Bogies: KW60A (powered cars); KW61A (trailer cars)
- Braking system: Electronically controlled pneumatic brakes with dynamic braking
- Safety system: Nishitetsu ATS
- Track gauge: 1,435 mm (4 ft 8 1/2 in)

The Nishitetsu 8000 series (西鉄8000形) was an electric multiple unit (EMU) train type that was operated by the private railway operator Nishi-Nippon Railroad (Nishitetsu) in Japan on the Nishitetsu Tenjin Ōmuta Line from 1989 to 2017.

== Design ==
Six 8000 series trains were built by Kawasaki Heavy Industries in 1989; the first three sets were constructed in February 1989, with the other three sets constructed in April the same year.

Unlike most trains made during this period, the 8000 series uses resistor control, something which would have been classified as obsolete during the time due to the advent of the variable-frequency drive. Initially, there were plans for the 8000 series to use a control method other than resistor control, but due to a combination of factors, the idea was soon dropped.

== Operations ==
The 8000 series trains operated on the Nishitetsu Tenjin Ōmuta and Dazaifu Lines and were mainly used on limited express services.

== Formations ==
The six six-car sets are formed as follows with four motored ("M") cars and two trailer ("Tc") cars, with car number 1 facing the Ōmuta end and car number 6 facing the Nishitetsu Fukuoka (Tenjin) or Dazaifu end.

Car No.	1	2	3	4	5	6
Designation	Tc	M	M	M	M	Tc
Numbering	80x1	80x2	80x3	80x4	80x5	80x6
Weight (t)	29.3	37.2	35.6	37.2	35.5	29.3
Capacity (Seated/total)	50/116	60/130	59/128	60/130	60/130	50/116

Cars 2 and 5 have two lozenge-type pantographs each.

== Interior ==
Passenger accommodation consists of 2+2 transverse bucket seating with a seat width of 900 mm (35 in) per person; seats closer to the doors are bench seats. Both types of seats have the same wine-colored upholstery with a checkered pattern.

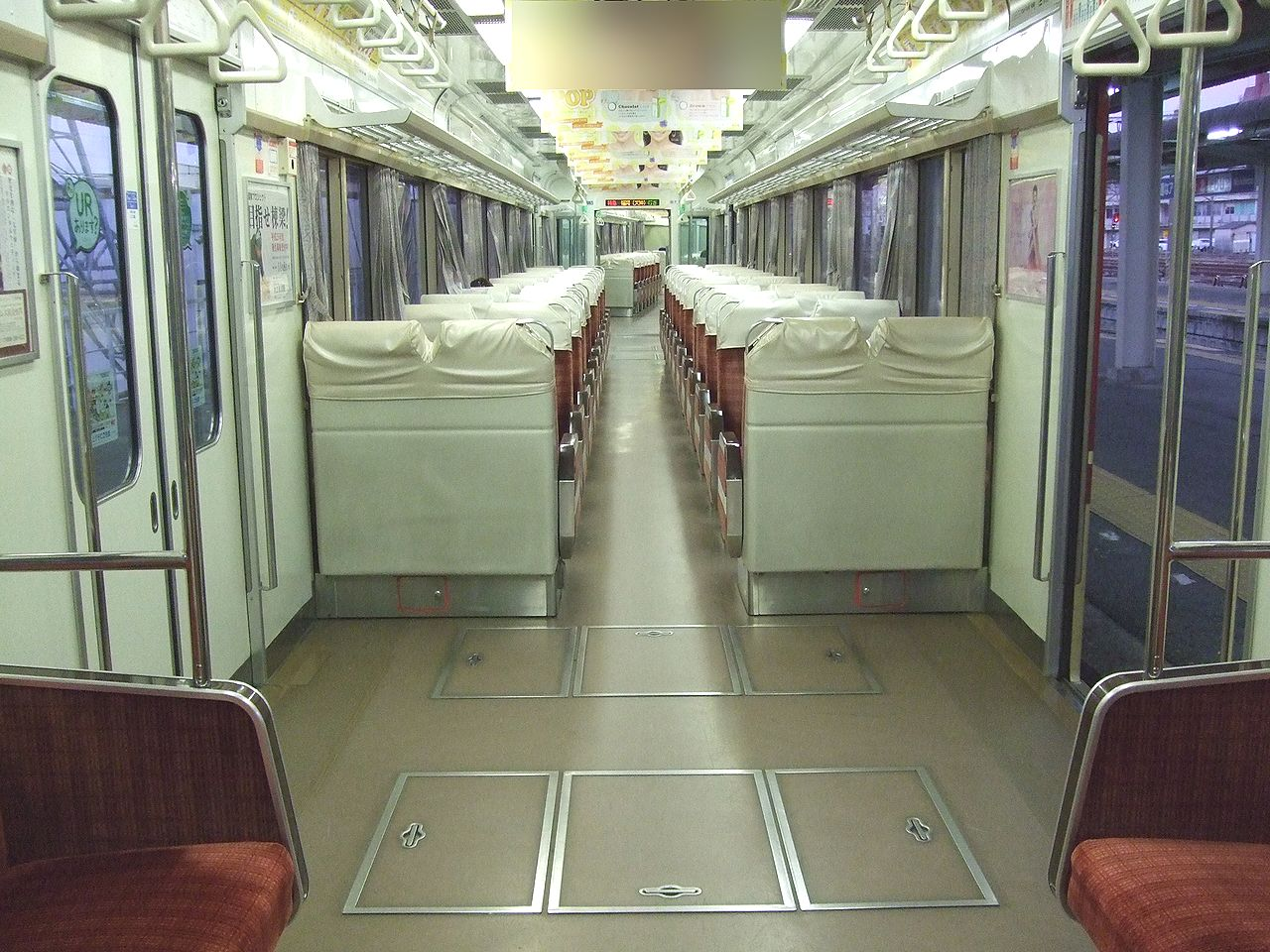
The interior of intermediate car 8065 in October 2012

== Conversions ==
=== Tabito excursion train ===
This was a six-car set converted from 8000 series set 8051 in 2014. The Tabito set differs from a normal 8000 series set by its livery and certain changes to its interior, such as the addition of a cabinet and a table with some leaflets in car number 3. This set entered service on 22 March 2014, and was withdrawn from service on 16 September 2017; the set was replaced with a 3000 series set with a similar livery. A handing over ceremony was later held at Fukuoka (Tenjin) Station after the 8000 series Tabito set completed its last run.

Following its retirement from the Tabito service, the special livery it used was removed and it was returned to its original colors of beige with red accents, and was almost fully restored back to its original condition. The set was then used for a few more special runs before being finally withdrawn on 15 October 2017.

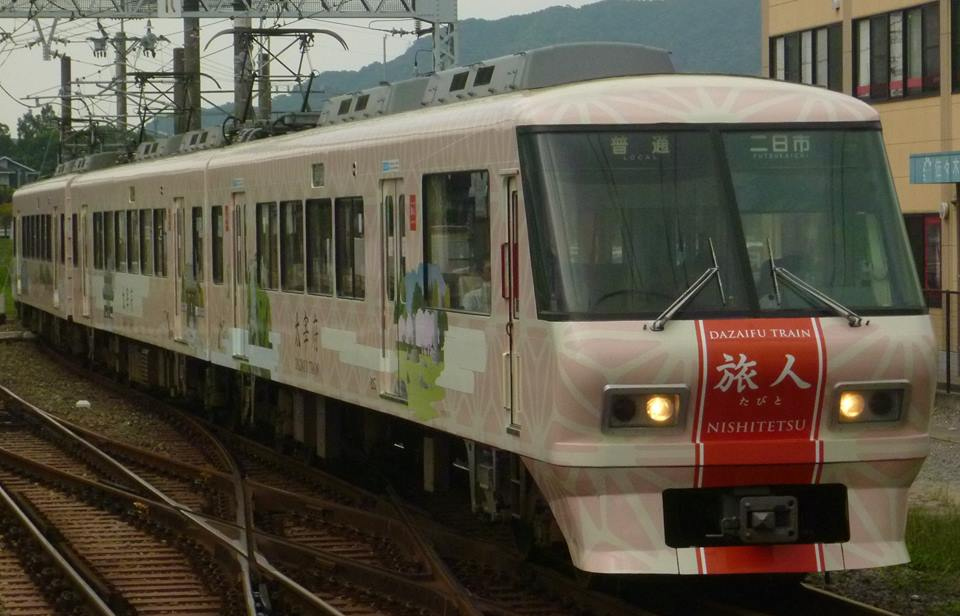
The Tabito set in September 2014

=== Suito excursion train ===
This was a six-car set converted from 8000 series set 8061 in 2015. The Suito set differs from a normal 8000 series set by its livery and certain changes to its interior, such as the addition of a table with commemorative stamp pads and a cabinet displaying antiques in car number 3. This set entered service on 4 October 2015 and was retired on 22 July 2017 due to aging; the set was replaced by a 3000 series set with a similar livery. As with the Tabito set, the Suito set was used for a special final run from Chikushi to Fukuoka (Tenjin) on 22 July 2017, with a handing over ceremony taking place at Fukuoka (Tenjin). After its final run, the set made its way to the Chikushi Depot.

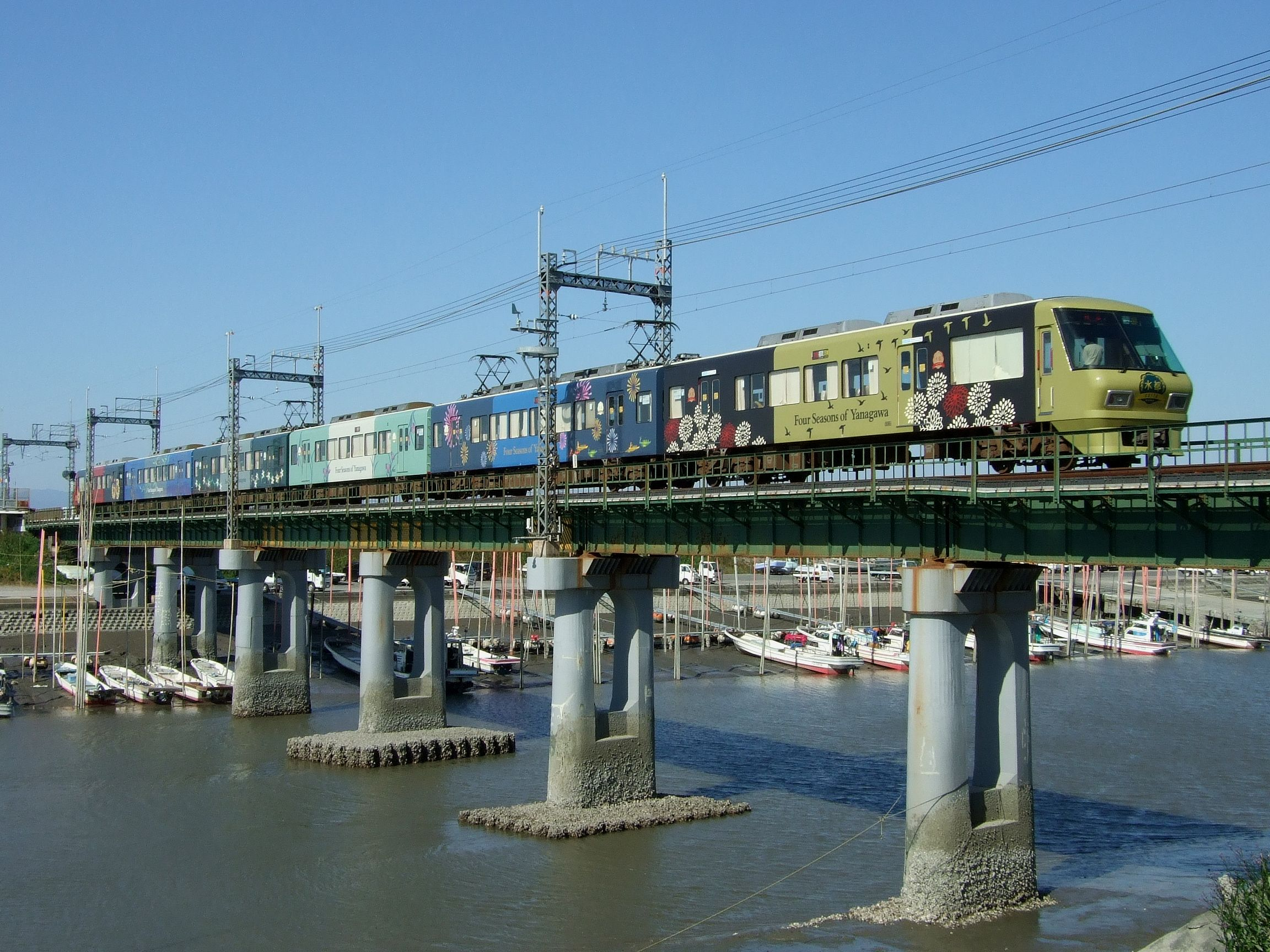
The Suito set in November 2015

== History ==
The trains were constructed in 1989 as the third generation of limited express trains on the Nishi-Nippon Railroad, following in the footsteps of the older 1000 series and 2000 series, with the latter already being 15 years old by the time the 8000 series were introduced.

Two sets were converted to excursion trains in 2014 and 2015, and were used until 2017. The last remaining set, 8051, was used for a special final run on 15 October 2017, from Nishitetsu Fukuoka (Tenjin) to Chikushi Station, following which, the 8000 series was officially withdrawn. After its run from Nishitetsu Fukuoka (Tenjin) to Chikushi, the set made its way to the Nishitetsu Train Festival at Chikushi Depot, where it was exhibited. No 8000 series cars have been preserved.

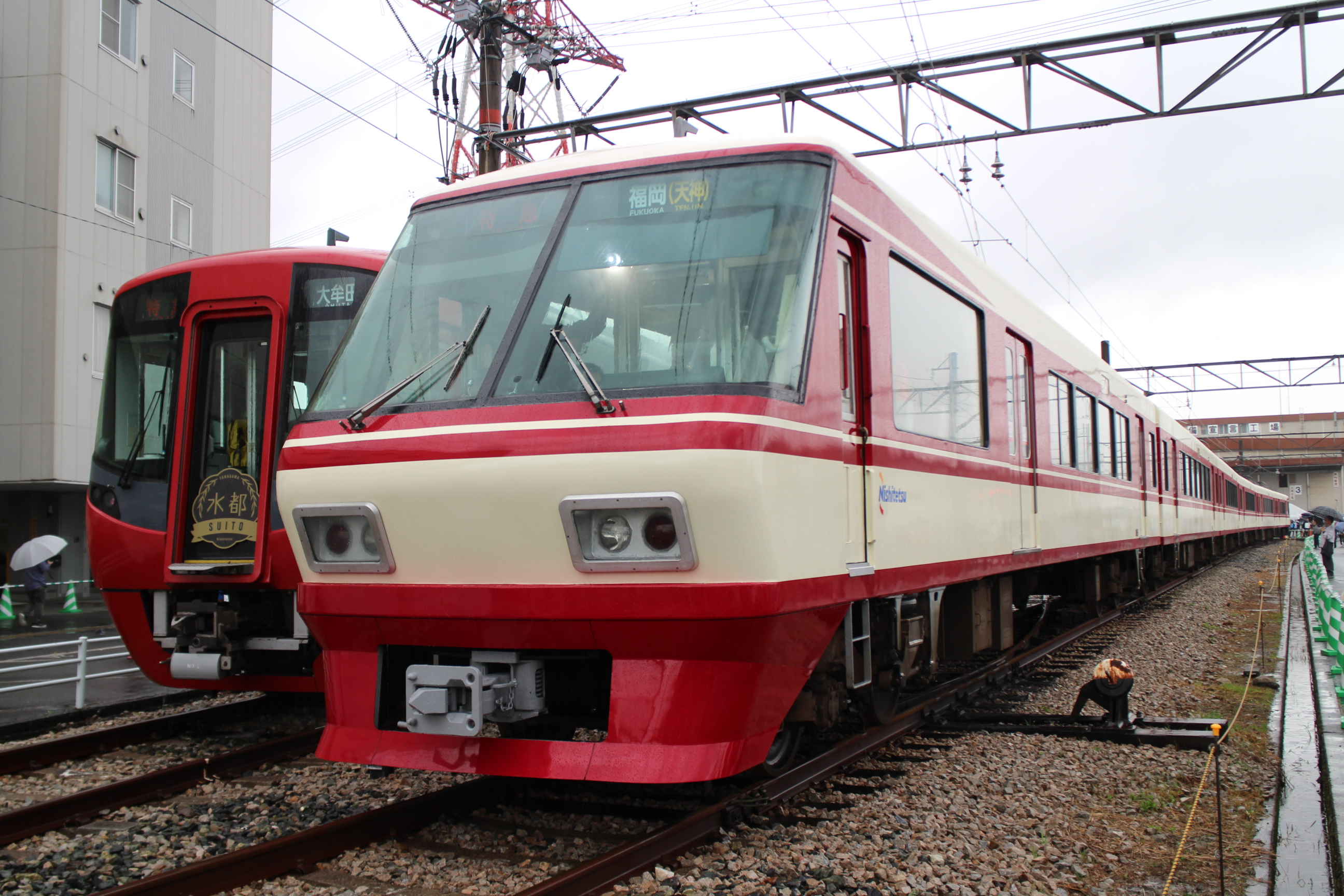
Set 8051 at Chikushi Depot on 15 October 2017
