= Sakuradai Station =

Sakuradai Station (桜台駅) is the name of two train stations in Japan:

- Sakuradai Station (Fukuoka)
- Sakuradai Station (Tokyo)
