= Gojō Station =

Gojō Station may refer to:

- Gojō Station (Kyoto), a subway station on the Karasuma Line in Kyoto, Japan
- Gojō Station (Nara), a railway station on the Wakayama Line in Nara Prefecture, Japan
- Nishitetsu Gojō Station, a railway station on the Nishitetsu Dazaifu Line in Fukuoka Prefecture, Japan
- Kiyomizu-Gojō Station, a railway station on the Keihan Main Line in Kyoto, Japan (formerly called Gojō Station)
