= Tofurōmae Station =

Railway station in Dazaifu, Fukuoka Prefecture, Japan

Tofurōmae Station 都府楼前駅
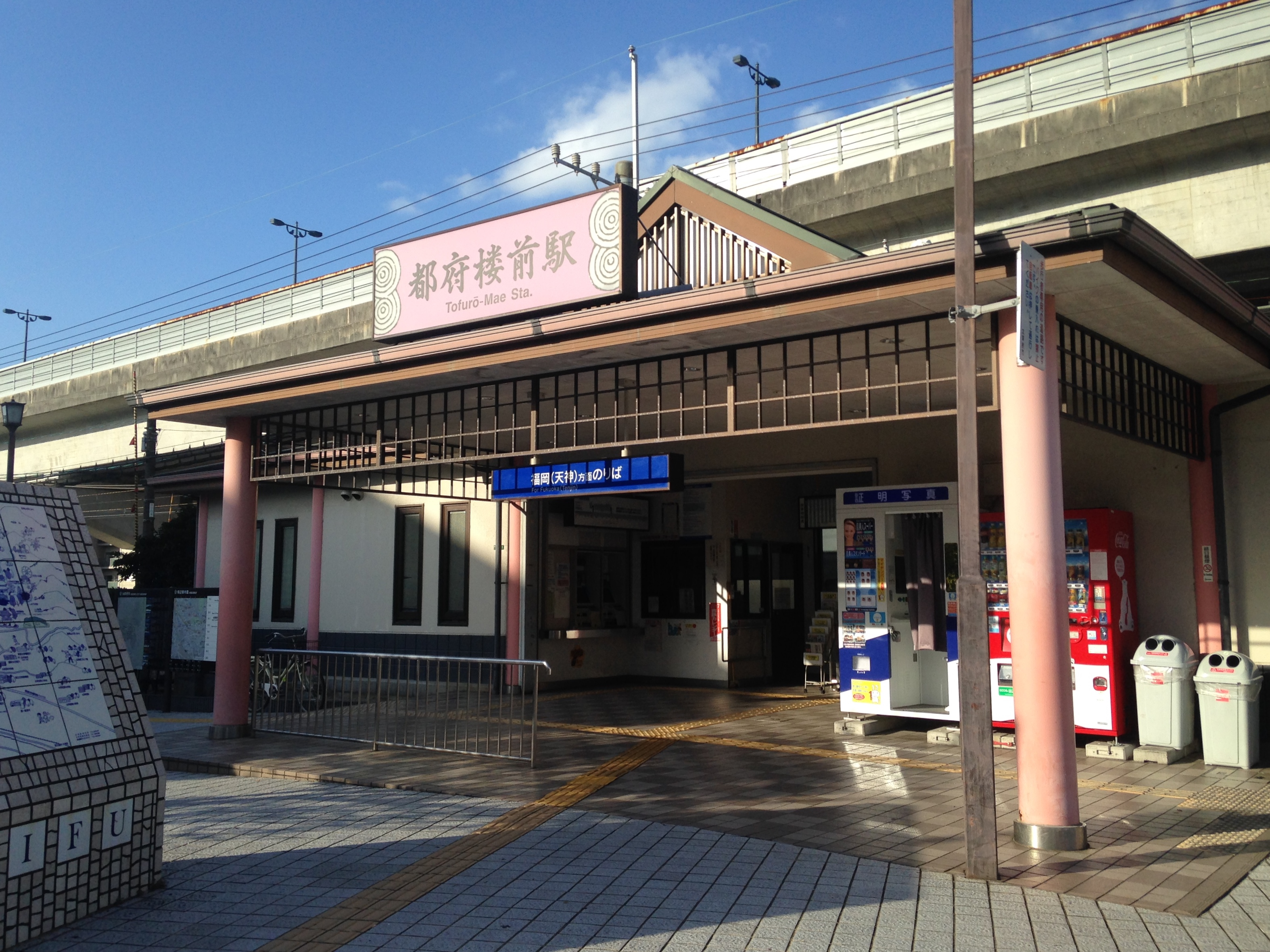

General information
- Location: 14, Tōnokoga 3-chōme, Dazaifu-shi, Fukuoka-ken; Japan
- Coordinates: 33°30′43″N 130°30′27″E
- Operator: Nishi-Nippon Railroad
- Line: ■ Tenjin Ōmuta Line
- Platforms: 2 side platforms
- Connections: Bus stop

Other information
- Station code: T12
- Website: Official website

History
- Opened: 11 April 1924

Passengers
- FY2022: 5685
Location
- Location within Fukuoka Prefecture Location within Japan

Tofurōmae Station (都府楼前駅, Tofurōmae-eki) is a passenger railway station located in the city of Dazaifu, Fukuoka, Japan. It is operated by the private transportation company Nishi-Nippon Railroad (NNR), and has station number T14.

== Lines ==
The station is served by the Nishitetsu Tenjin Ōmuta Line and is 13.8 kilometers from the starting point of the line at Nishitetsu Fukuoka (Tenjin) Station.

== Station layout ==
The station consists of a two opposed ground level side platforms. There is no connection between platforms, and passengers wishing to change platforms must leave the station and re-enter after crossing a level crossing outside the station. The station is staffed.

== Platforms ==
1	■ Tenjin Ōmuta Line	for Futsukaichi, Kurume, Yanagawa and Ōmuta
2	■ Tenjin Ōmuta Line	for Kasugabaru, Yakuin and Fukuoka

== Adjacent stations ==
←	Service	→
Tenjin Ōmuta Line
Shimoōri	Local	Nishitetsu Futsukaichi
Express: Does not stop at this station
Limited Express: Does not stop at this station

== History ==
The station opened on 11 April 1924.

== Passenger statistics ==
In fiscal 2022, the station was used by 5685 passengers daily.

== Surrounding area ==
Japan National Route 3 runs parallel to the Tenjin Omuta Line in front of the station building, and Fukuoka Prefectural Route 112 straddles the platform on the south side of the station building. Furthermore, National Route 3 (Sekiya Viaduct) crosses over it with a double viaduct. JR Tofurou Minami Station is about 800 meters away. The area surrounding the station is mostly residential, with many roadside stores and businesses located along the main roads. The Ruins of the Dazaifu Government Office, from which the station takes its name, is approximately 700 meters from the station (approximately eight minutes on foot).

== See also ==
- List of railway stations in Japan
