= Fukuoka Prefectural Dazaifu High School =

Public school in Dazaifu, Fukuoka, Japan

- 福岡県立太宰府高等学校

Location
- Dazaifu; Japan
- Coordinates: 33.5038°N 130.5440°E

Information
- Motto: Ambition, Faith, Sincerity
- Established: April 1984; 41 years ago
- Website: dazaifu.fku.ed.jp

Fukuoka Prefectural Dazaifu High School (福岡県立太宰府高等学校, Fukuoka Kenritsu Dazaifu Kōtōgakkō) is a public senior high school in Dazaifu, Fukuoka Prefecture.

The school is a part of the prefectural school district six, and as of 2015 is the newest high school in it. The school has a focus on art and displays many pieces of art due to its proximity to the Kyushu National Museum. It is the sole high school in the prefecture which offers art courses. The school began classes in April 1985.
