= Kyushu National Museum =

Coordinates: 33°31′6.08″N 130°32′17.87″E

- 九州国立博物館
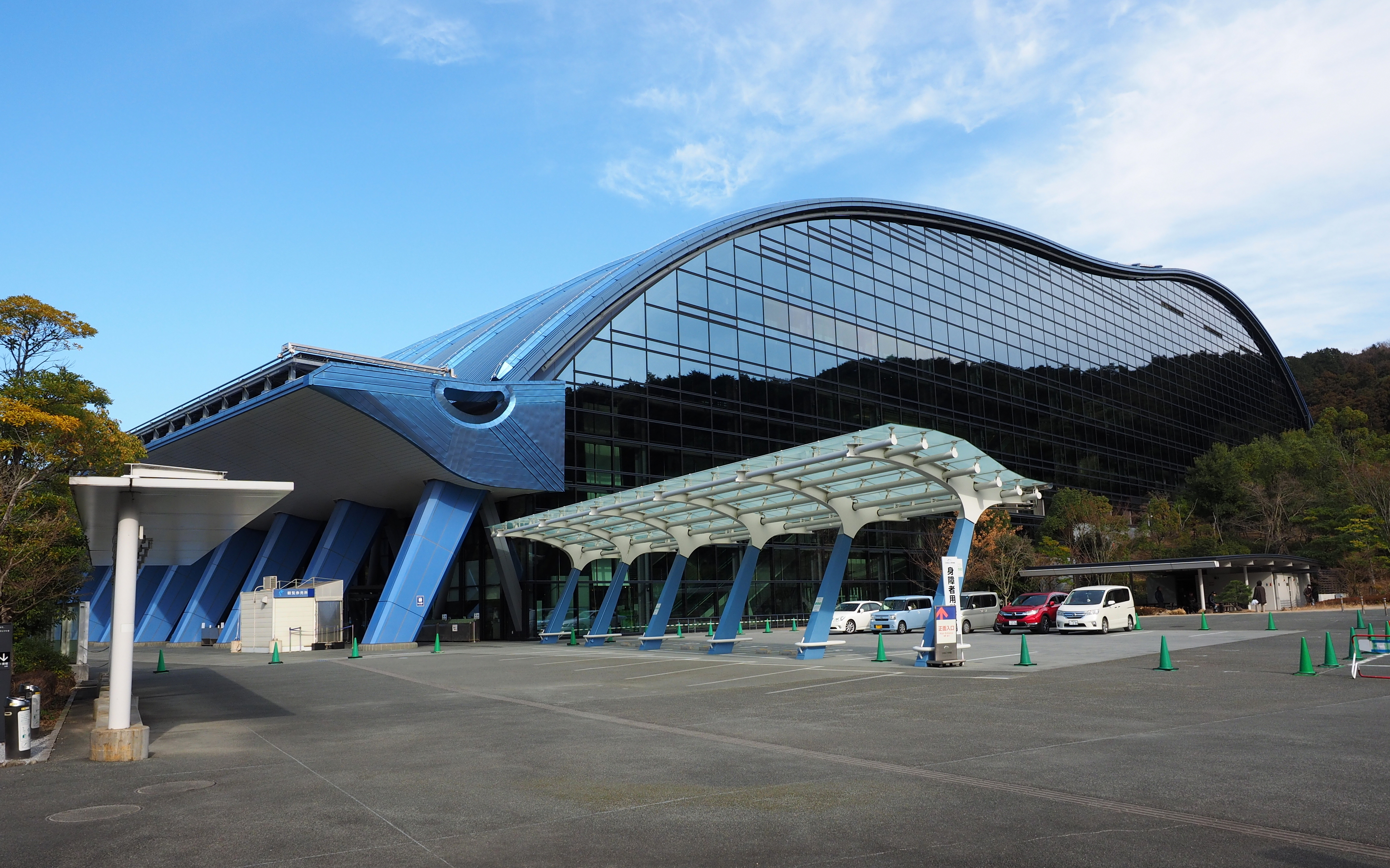
- The southern face of the Kyushu National Museum
- Established: October 16, 2005
- Location: Dazaifu, Fukuoka, Japan
- Type: Art museum
- Public transit access: Dazaifu Station, Nishitetsu Dazaifu Line
- Website: http://www.kyuhaku.com

The Kyushu National Museum (九州国立博物館, Kyūshū Kokuritsu Hakubutsukan) opened on October 16, 2005, in Dazaifu near Fukuoka—the first new national museum in Japan in over 100 years, and the first to elevate the focus on history over art. The distinct modern impression created by the architectural facade is mirrored in the museum's use of technological innovations which are put to good in making the museum's collections accessible to the public. For example, the museum's extremely high resolution video system, with the latest image processing and color management software, serves both in documenting the objects in the museum's collection and also in expanding access beyond the limits of a large, but finite exhibition space.

The striking wood and glass building in the hills, it hosts important collections of Japanese artifacts, particularly ceramics, related to the history of Kyūshū.

It hosts temporary exhibitions on the third floor, while the permanent collections are on the fourth floor. The collections cover the history of Kyūshū from prehistory to the Meiji era with particular emphasis on the rich history of cultural exchange between Kyūshū and neighboring China and Korea.

Unlike most museums in Japan, which contract out conservation work, the Kyushu National Museum has an extensive on-site suite of conservation labs and associated staff, serving as the major conservation center for all of western Japan.

The museum was designed by Kiyonori Kikutake.

== History ==
The museum's special focus carries with it "a new perspective on Japanese cultural formation in the context of Asian history."

=== Timeline ===
The growth and development of today's museum has been an evolving process:

- 1994 -- Agency for Cultural Affairs (ACA) creates "Committee to Investigate the Establishment of a New Type of Museum."
- 1995 -- Dazaifu is named as site of new "Kyushu National Museum." The site is next to the Dazaifu Tenman-gū.
- 1997 -- "Basic Statement of Policy for the Kyushu National Museum" is completed.
- 1998 -- "Basic Plan for the Kyushu National Museum" is completed.
- 1999 -- "Basic Construction Design" is completed.
- 1999 -- "Regular Exhibition Plan" is completed.
- 2000 -- "Design for Implementing Construction" is completed.
- 2000 -- "Basic Exhibition Design" is completed.
- 2001 -- "Construction Phase" is begun—1st part of a 3-year plan.
- 2002 -- "Implementation of Exhibition Design" is completed.
- 2003 -- "Construction Phase" is completed.
- 2003 -- "Exhibition Phase" is begun -- (1st part of a 2-year plan).
- 2004—Work on the building is completed.
- 2005—Museum is officially opened as the "Kyushu National Museum" of the "Independent Administrative Institution National Museum" (IAI National Museum).
- 2007—IAI National Museum is merged into Independent Administrative Institution National Institutes for Cultural Heritage (NICH), combining the four national museums with the former National Institutes for Cultural Preservation at Tokyo and Nara

== See also ==
- List of Independent Administrative Institutions (Japan)
- List of National Treasures of Japan (writings)
- List of National Treasures of Japan (crafts-swords)
