= Shirakibaru Station =

Railway station in Ōnojō, Fukuoka Prefecture, Japan

Shirakibaru Station 白木原駅
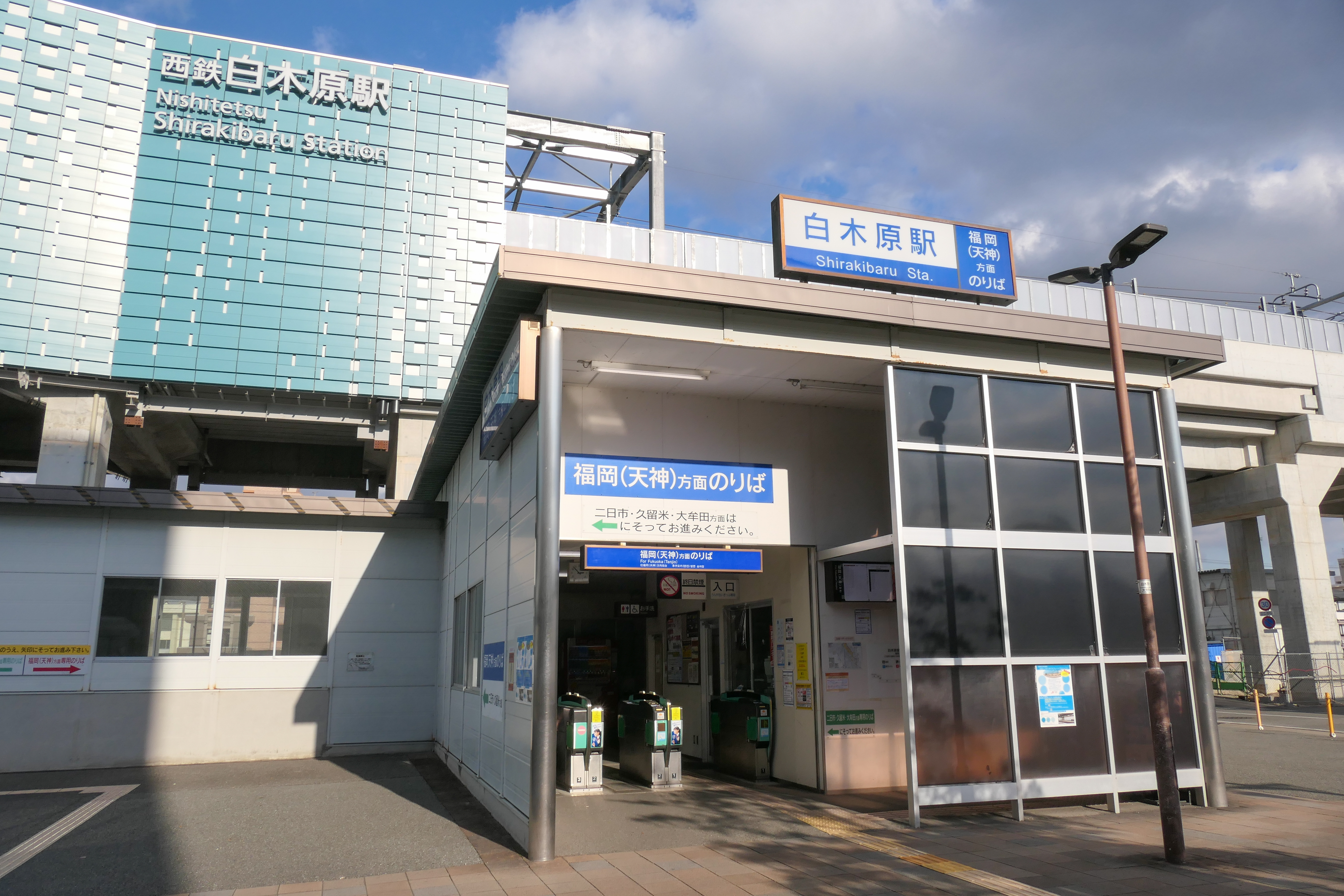
- Shirakibaru Station 2022

General information
- Location: 6, Shirakibaru 1-chōme, Ōnojō-shi, Fukuoka-ken; Japan
- Coordinates: 33°31′42″N 130°28′59″E
- Operator: Nishi-Nippon Railroad
- Line: ■ Tenjin Ōmuta Line
- Distance: 10.8 km from Nishitetsu Fukuoka (Tenjin)
- Platforms: 2 side platforms
- Connections: Bus stop

Construction
- Structure type: Elevated
- Accessible: Yes

Other information
- Station code: T10
- Website: Official website

History
- Opened: 6 May 1950

Passengers
- FY2022: 8973

Services
Preceding station	Nishitetsu	Following station
Kasugabaru towards Nishitetsu Fukuoka (Tenjin)	Tenjin Ōmuta Line Local	Shimoōri towards Ōmuta
Location
- Location within Fukuoka Prefecture Location within Japan

Shirakibaru Station (白木原駅, Shirakibaru-eki) is a passenger railway station located in the city of Ōnojō, Fukuoka, Japan. It is operated by the private transportation company Nishi-Nippon Railroad (NNR), and has station number T10.

== Lines ==
The station is served by the Nishitetsu Tenjin Ōmuta Line and is 10.8 kilometers from the starting point of the line at Nishitetsu Fukuoka (Tenjin) Station.

== Station layout ==
The station consists of a two opposed elevated side platforms with the station building underneath.

== Platforms ==
1	■ Tenjin Ōmuta Line	for Nishitetsu Futsukaichi, Nishitetsu Kurume, Nishitetsu Yanagawa and Ōmuta
2	■ Tenjin Ōmuta Line	for Yakuin and Nishitetsu Fukuoka (Tenjin)

== History ==
The station was opened as a temporary station in 1946 and opened as a permanent station on 6 May 1950. In September 1964 the station building was renovated. On 28 August 2022, the facilities were moved to a new elevated station as part of a grade separation project.

== Passenger statistics ==
In fiscal 2022, the station was used by 8973 passengers daily.

== Surrounding area ==
- Onojo City Ono Junior High School
- Onojo City Ono Elementary School
- Mizuki Castle ruins

== See also ==
- List of railway stations in Japan
