= Sakuradai Station (Tokyo) =

Railway station in Tokyo, Japan

Coordinates: 35°44′20″N 139°39′45″E

SI05 Sakuradai Station 桜台駅
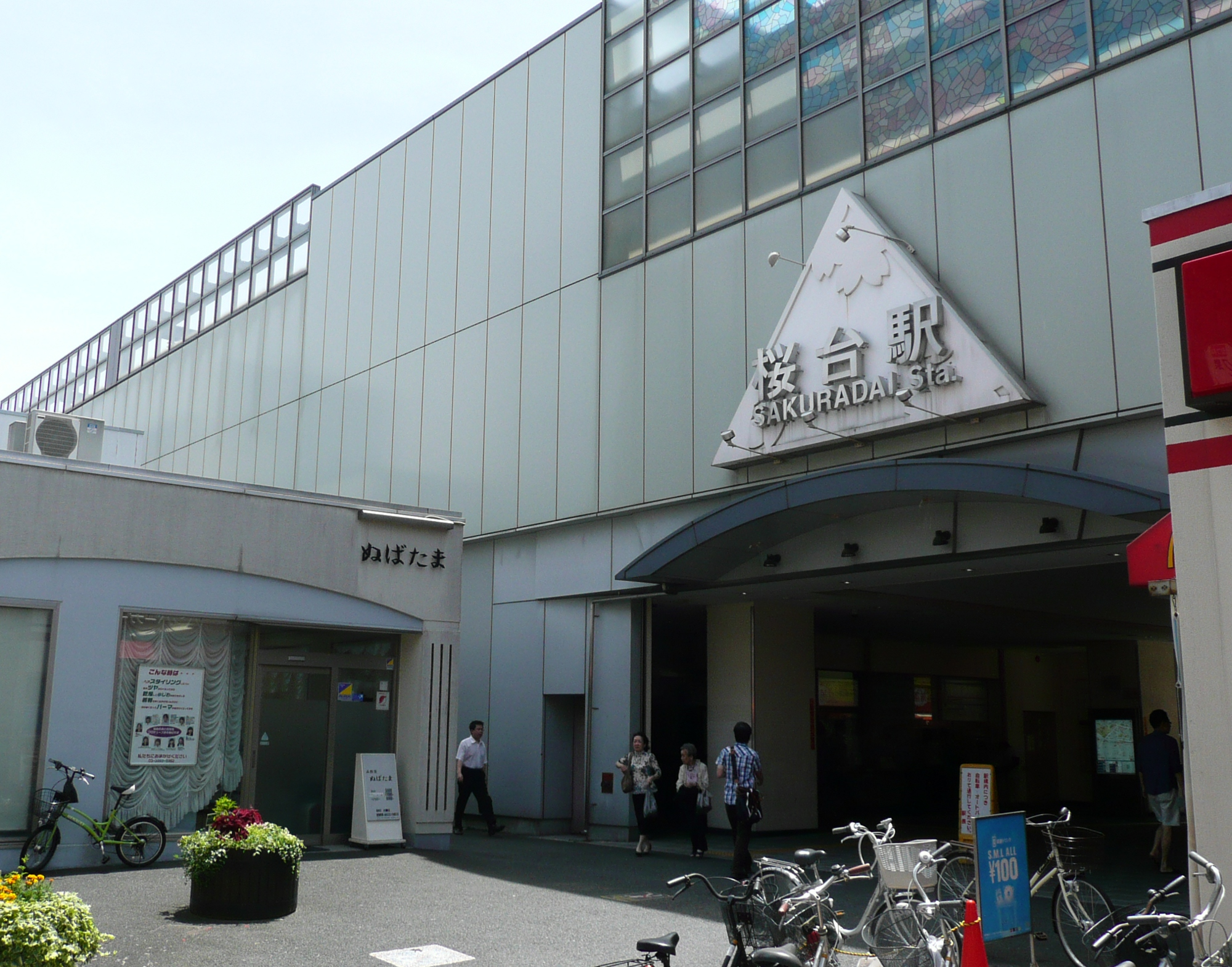
- North entrance, July 2012

General information
- Location: 1-5-1 Sakuradai, Nerima, Tokyo （東京都練馬区桜台1-5-1） Japan
- Operator: Seibu Railway
- Line: Seibu Ikebukuro Line

Other information
- Station code: SI05

History
- Opened: July 10, 1936

Passengers
- FY2013: 13,674 daily

Services
Preceding station	Seibu Railway	Following station
Nerima SI06 towards Agano	Ikebukuro Line Local	Ekoda SI04 towards Ikebukuro
Location

Sakuradai Station (桜台駅, Sakuradai-eki) is a railway station on the Seibu Ikebukuro Line in Nerima, Tokyo, Japan, operated by the private railway operator Seibu Railway.

== Lines ==
Sakuradai Station is served by the Seibu Ikebukuro Line from Ikebukuro in Tokyo to Hannō in Saitama Prefecture, and is located 5.2 km from the Ikebukuro terminus. Only all-stations "Local" services stop at this station.

== Station layout ==
Sakuradai Station consists of an elevated island platform serving two tracks.

=== Platforms ===
1	Seibu Ikebukuro Line	for Tokorozawa and Hannō
2	Seibu Ikebukuro Line	for Ikebukuro

== History ==
The station opened on July 10, 1936. It temporarily closed on 3 February 1945, reopening on 1 April 1948.

Station numbering was introduced on all Seibu Railway lines during fiscal 2012, with Sakuradai Station becoming "SI05".

== Passenger statistics ==
In fiscal 2013, the station was the 59th busiest on the Seibu network with an average of 13,674 passengers daily.

The passenger figures for previous years are as shown below.

Fiscal year	Daily average
2000	15,081
2009	13,872
2010	13,053
2011	12,978
2012	13,376
2013	13,674

== See also ==
- Sakuradai Station (Fukuoka), a station in Fukuoka with the same name
