= Asakuragaidō Station =

Railway station in Chikushino, Fukuoka Prefecture, Japan

Asakuragaidō Station 朝倉街道駅
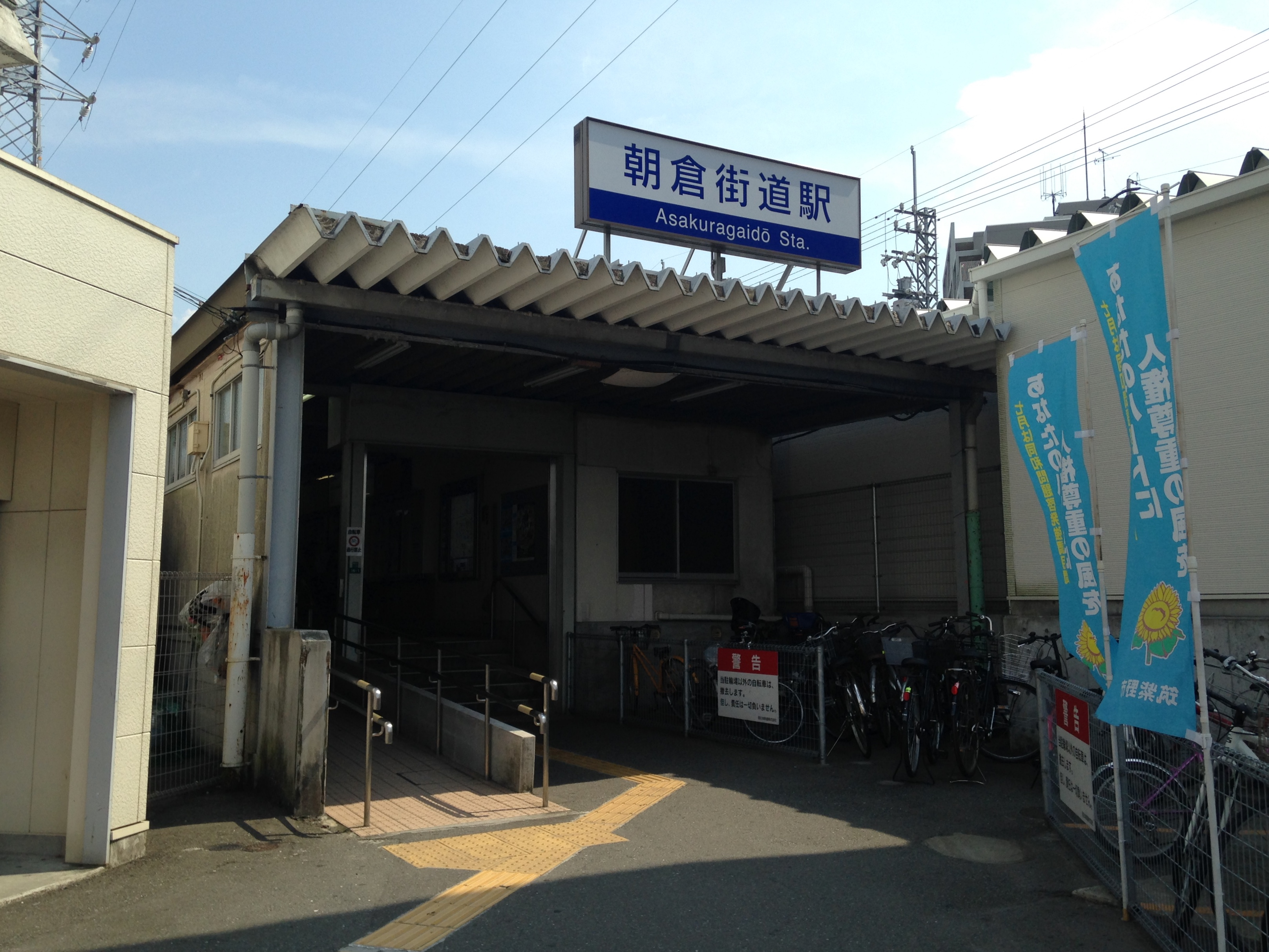
- Asakuragaidō Station

General information
- Location: 4-1 2-chōme Harisuri, Chikushino-shi, Fukuoka-ken 818-0083; Japan
- Coordinates: 33°29′03″N 130°31′57″E
- Operator: Nishi-Nippon Railroad
- Line: ■ Tenjin Ōmuta Line
- Distance: 17.6 km from Nishitetsu Fukuoka (Tenjin)
- Platforms: 2 side platforms

Other information
- Station code: T15
- Website: Official website

History
- Opened: 12 April 1924

Passengers
- FY2022: 11,853

Services
Preceding station	Nishitetsu	Following station
Murasaki towards Nishitetsu Fukuoka (Tenjin)	Tenjin Ōmuta Line Local	Sakuradai towards Ōmuta
Nishitetsu Futsukaichi towards Nishitetsu Fukuoka (Tenjin)	Tenjin Ōmuta Line Express	Chikushi towards Ōmuta
Location
- Location within Fukuoka Prefecture Location within Japan

Asakuragaidō Station (朝倉街道駅, Asakuragaidō-eki) is a passenger railway station located in the city of Chikushino, Fukuoka, Japan. It is operated by the private transportation company Nishi-Nippon Railroad, and has station number T15.

== Lines ==
The station is served by the Nishitetsu Tenjin Ōmuta Line and is 17.6 kilometers from the starting point of the line at Nishitetsu Fukuoka (Tenjin) Station.

== Station layout ==
The station consists of a two opposed ground-level side platforms connected with the station building by a footbridge. The station is staffed.

== Platforms ==
1	■ Tenjin Ōmuta Line	for Kurume, Yanagawa and Ōmuta
2	■ Tenjin Ōmuta Line	for Futsukaichi,Fukuoka

== History ==
The station opened on 12 April 1924 as a station on the Kyushu Railway. The company merged with the Kyushu Electric Tramway on 19 September 1942. The company changed its name to Nishi-Nippon Railway three days later, on 22 September 1942.

== Passenger statistics ==
In fiscal 2022, the station was used by 11,853 passengers daily.

== Surrounding area ==
- Chikushino City Hall
- Fukuoka Prefectural Chikushi High School - approximately 1.2 km to the northeast

== See also ==
- List of railway stations in Japan
