= Chikushi Station =

Railway station in Chikushino, Fukuoka Prefecture, Japan

Chikushi Station 筑紫駅
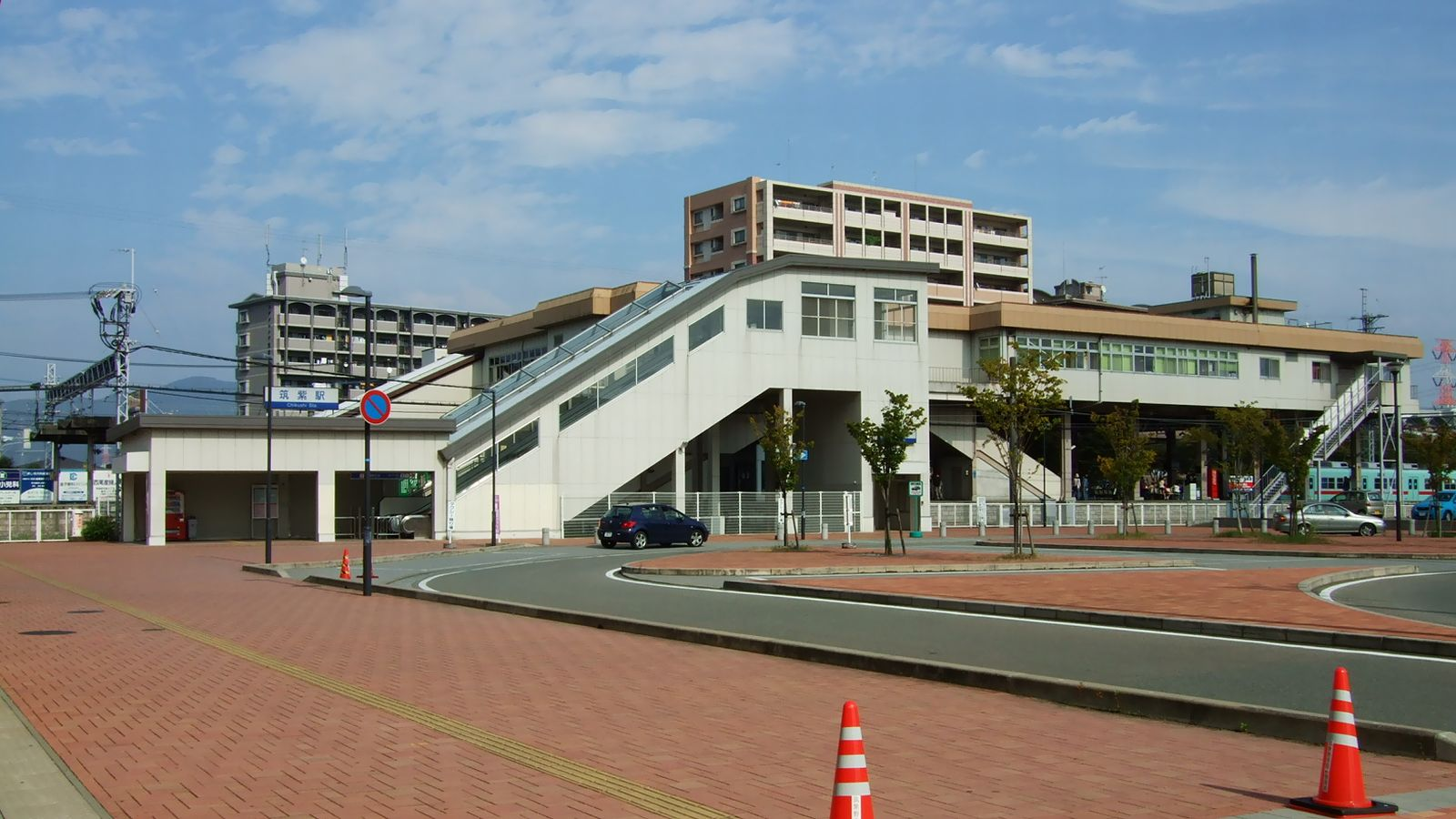
- Chikushi Station in 2008

General information
- Location: 2-chōme Chikushi, Chikushino-shi, Fukuoka-ken 818-0025; Japan
- Coordinates: 33°27′46″N 130°33′11″E
- Operator: Nishi-Nippon Railroad
- Line: ■ Tenjin Ōmuta Line
- Distance: 20.8 km from Nishitetsu Fukuoka (Tenjin)
- Platforms: 2 island platforms
- Connections: Bus terminal

Construction
- Structure type: elevated

Other information
- Station code: T17
- Website: Official website

History
- Opened: 12 April 1924

Passengers
- FY2022: 7006

Services
Preceding station	Nishitetsu	Following station
Sakuradai towards Nishitetsu Fukuoka (Tenjin)	Tenjin Ōmuta Line Local	Tsuko towards Ōmuta
Asakuragaidō towards Nishitetsu Fukuoka (Tenjin)	Tenjin Ōmuta Line Express	Nishitetsu Ogōri towards Ōmuta
Location
- Location within Fukuoka Prefecture Location within Japan

Chikushi Station (筑紫駅, Chikushi-eki) is a passenger railway station located in the city of Chikushino, Fukuoka, Japan. It is operated by the private transportation company Nishi-Nippon Railroad (NNR), and has station number T17.

== Lines ==
The station is served by the Nishitetsu Tenjin Ōmuta Line and is 20.8 kilometers from the starting point of the line at Nishitetsu Fukuoka (Tenjin) Station.

== Station layout ==
The station consists of a two island platforms with an elevated station building. The station is staffed.

== Platforms ==
1, 2	■ Tenjin Ōmuta Line	for Kurume, Yanagawa and Ōmuta
3, 4	■ Tenjin Ōmuta Line	for Futsukaichi,Fukuoka

== History ==
The station opened on 12 April 1924 as a station on the Kyushu Railway. The company merged with the Kyushu Electric Tramway on 19 September 1942. The company changed its name to Nishi-Nippon Railway three days later, on 22 September 1942.

== Passenger statistics ==
In fiscal 2022, the station was used by 7006 passengers daily.

== Surrounding area ==
The station is located in the southern part of Chikushino City. There are residential areas surrounding the station.

- Chikushino City Chikushi Elementary School
- Chikushino City Chikuyama Junior High School
- Chikushino City Hall Chikushi Branch

== See also ==
- List of railway stations in Japan
