= Shimoōri Station =

Railway station in Ōnojō, Fukuoka Prefecture, Japan

Shimoōri Station 下大利駅
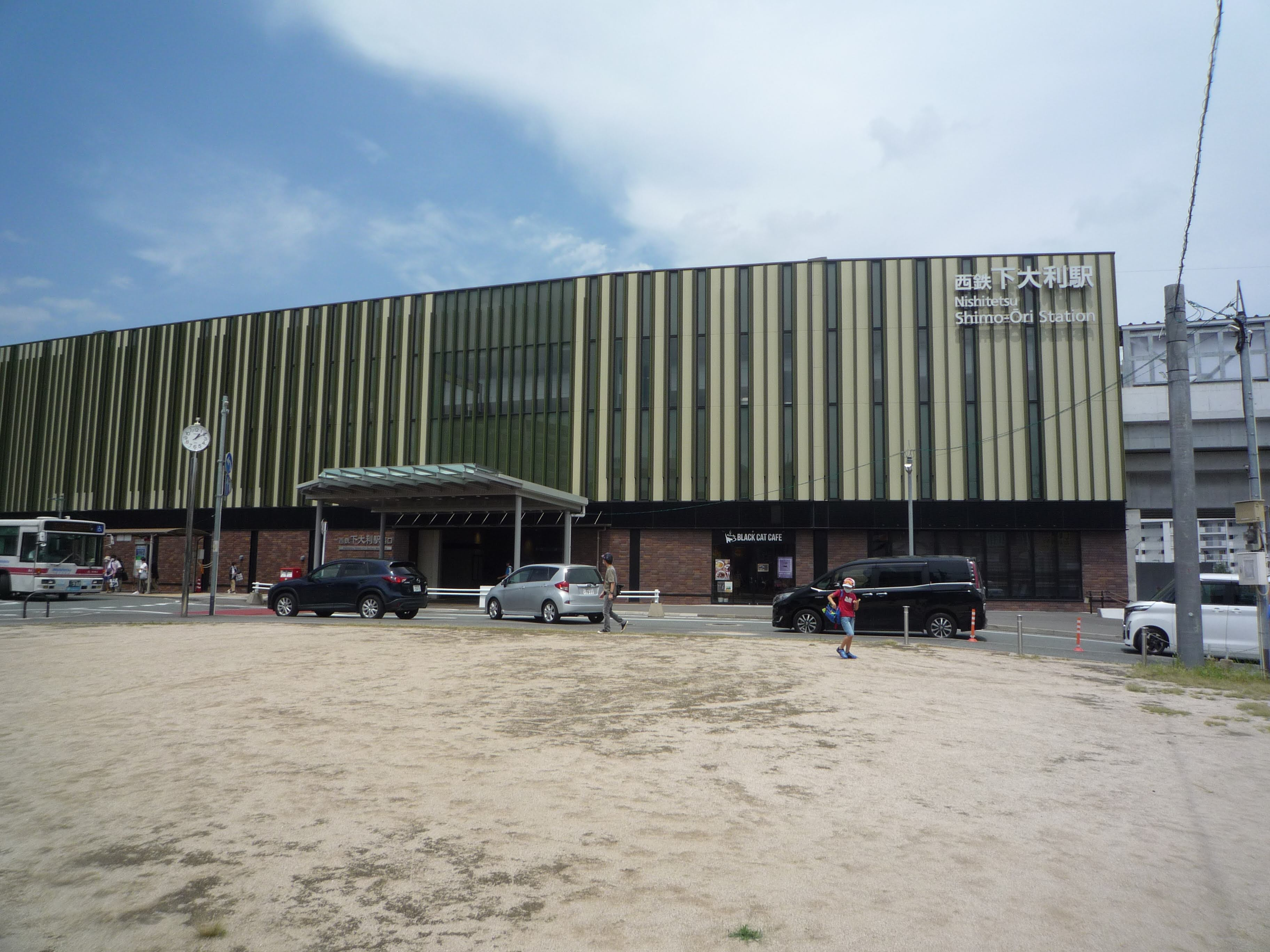
- Western face in August 2023

General information
- Location: 10, Shimoōri 1-chōme, Ōnojō-shi, Fukuoka-ken; Japan
- Coordinates: 33°31′20″N 130°29′22″E
- Operator: Nishi-Nippon Railroad
- Line: ■ Tenjin Ōmuta Line
- Distance: 11.6 km from Nishitetsu Fukuoka (Tenjin)
- Platforms: 2 side platforms
- Connections: Bus stop

Other information
- Station code: T11
- Website: Official website

History
- Opened: 12 April 1924

Passengers
- FY2022: 14,148

Services
Preceding station	Nishitetsu	Following station
Shirakibaru towards Nishitetsu Fukuoka (Tenjin)	Tenjin Ōmuta Line Local	Tofurōmae towards Ōmuta
Kasugabaru towards Nishitetsu Fukuoka (Tenjin)	Tenjin Ōmuta Line Express	Nishitetsu Futsukaichi towards Ōmuta
Location
- Location within Fukuoka Prefecture Location within Japan

Shimoōri Station (下大利駅, Shimoōri-eki) is a passenger railway station located in the city of Ōnojō, Fukuoka, Japan. It is operated by the private transportation company Nishi-Nippon Railroad (NNR), and has station number T14.

== Lines ==
The station is served by the Nishitetsu Tenjin Ōmuta Line and is 11.6 kilometers from the starting point of the line at Nishitetsu Fukuoka (Tenjin) Station.

== Station layout ==
The station consists of a two elevated side platforms, with the station building underneath. The station is staffed.

== Platforms ==
1	■ Tenjin Ōmuta Line	for Futsukaichi, Kurume, Yanagawa and Ōmuta
2	■ Tenjin Ōmuta Line	for Kasugabaru, Yakuin and Fukuoka

== History ==
The statin was opened on 12 April 1924. On 28 August 2022, the facilities were moved to a new elevated station as part of a grade separation project.

== Passenger statistics ==
In fiscal 2022, the station was used by 14,148 passengers daily.

== Surrounding area ==
Located in the southeastern corner of Onojo City, it is far from the center, but serves as a base for bus routes to the residential areas developed in the southernmost part of the city.

== See also ==
- List of railway stations in Japan
