= Nishitetsu 9000 series =

Japanese train type

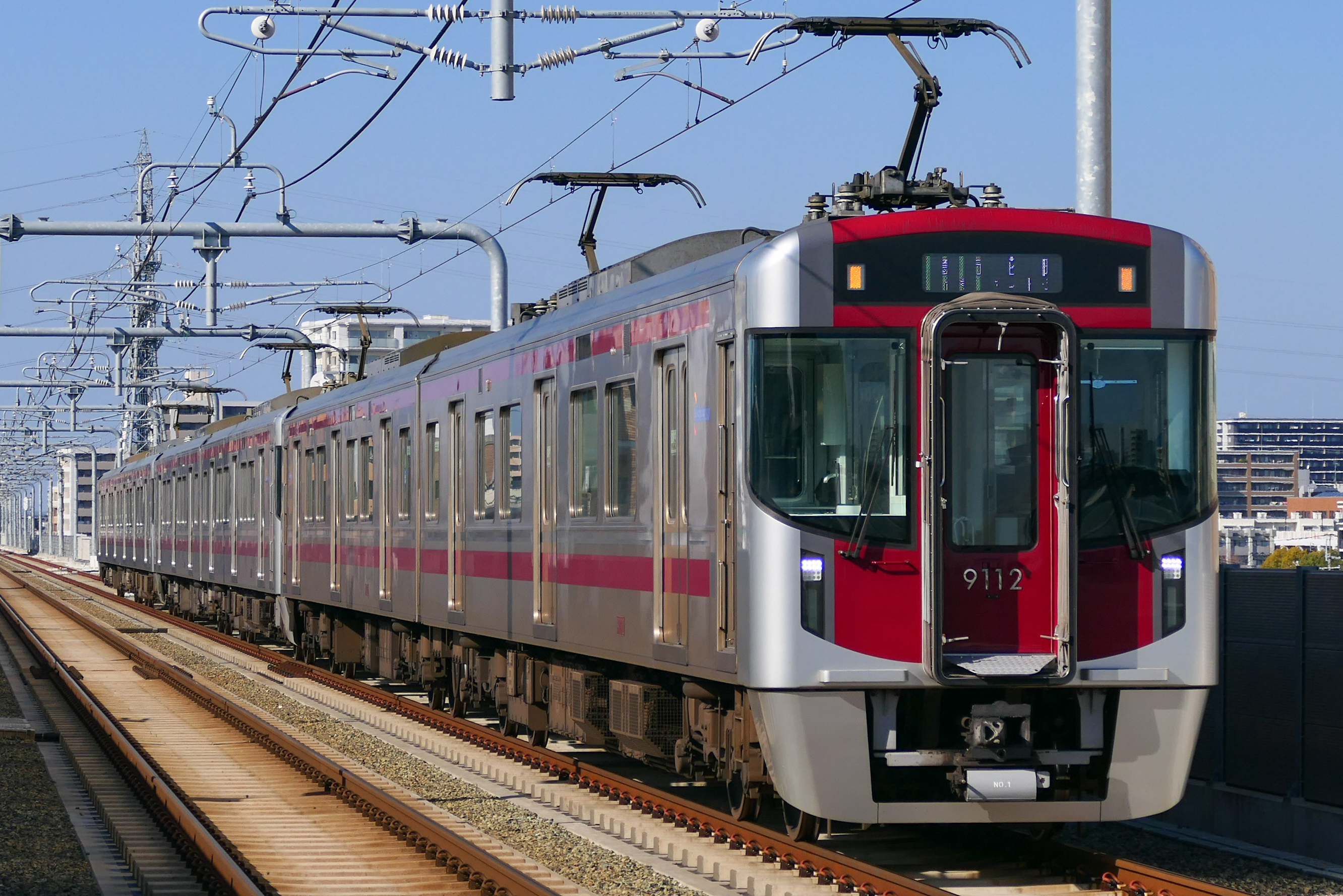
- A 2-car 9000 series set leading an express service in January 2024
- Manufacturer: Kawasaki Heavy Industries
- Family name: efACE
- Replaced: 5000 series
- Constructed: 2016–
- Entered service: 20 March 2017
- Number built: 25 vehicles (10 sets)
- Number in service: 25 vehicles (10 sets)
- Formation: 2/3 cars per trainset
- Operator: Nishi-Nippon Railroad
- Line served: Nishitetsu Tenjin Ōmuta Line

Specifications
- Car body construction: Stainless steel
- Car length: 19,500 mm (64 ft 0 in)
- Width: 2,760 mm (9 ft 1 in)
- Height: 4,165 mm (13 ft 8.0 in)
- Floor height: 1,180 mm (3 ft 10 in)
- Doors: 3 pairs per side
- Maximum speed: 110 km/h (68 mph) (service); 120 km/h (75 mph) (design)
- Traction system: Variable frequency (IGBT/SiC Hybrid module)
- Acceleration: 2.5 km/(h⋅s) (1.6 mph/s)
- Deceleration: 3.5 km/(h⋅s) (2.2 mph/s) (service brake); 4.0 km/(h⋅s) (2.5 mph/s) (emergency brake)
- Power supply: 1,500 V DC overhead catenary
- Current collection: Pantograph
- Track gauge: 1,435 mm (4 ft 8 1/2 in)

The Nishitetsu 9000 series (西鉄9000形) is an electric multiple unit (EMU) train type operated by the private railway operator Nishi-Nippon Railroad (Nishitetsu) in Japan on the Nishitetsu Tenjin Ōmuta Line since 20 March 2017.

Ten sets of five three-car and five two-car formations are in service as of 2021.

== Design ==
The 9000 series trains were built by Kawasaki Heavy Industries in Kobe, with two three-car sets and two two-car sets (10 vehicles) entering service in March 2017, and a further two three-car sets and one two-car set (eight vehicles) entering service in May 2017.

Based on the earlier 3000 series trains, externally, the new trains carry a livery with a "royal red" waist-line stripe.

== Operations ==
The 9000 series trains operate on Nishitetsu Tenjin Ōmuta Line express and all-stations local services.

== Formations ==
=== 2-car sets ===
The two-car sets are formed as follows with one motored ("M") car and one non-powered trailer ("T") car.

Designation	M	Tc
Numbering	91xx	95xx
Weight (t)	36.3	27.2
Capacity (Seated/total)	40/124	40/124

The motored car has two single-arm pantographs.

=== 3-car sets ===
The three-car sets are formed as follows with one motored ("M") car and two non-powered trailer ("T") cars.

Designation	Tc	M	Tc
Numbering	90xx	93xx	95xx
Weight (t)	26.0	34.6	27.2
Capacity (Seated/total)	40/124	38/138	40/124

The motored car has two single-arm pantographs.

== Interior ==
Passenger accommodation consists of longitudinal bench seating with a seat width of 470 mm (19 in) per person. LED lighting is used in the interiors, and two 17-inch LCD passenger information screens are provided above each of the doorways with information provided in four different languages (Japanese, English, Korean, and Chinese).

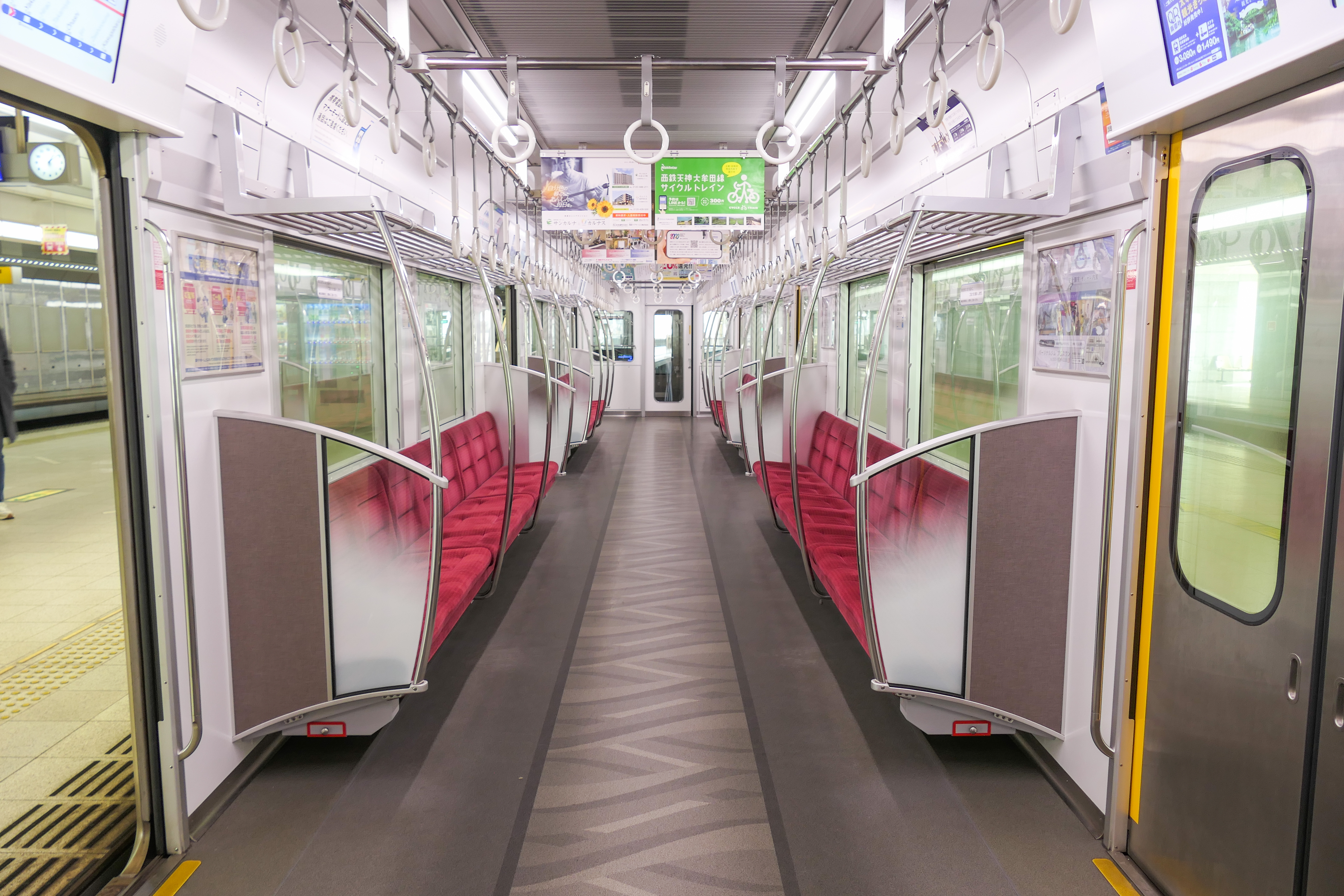
Interior

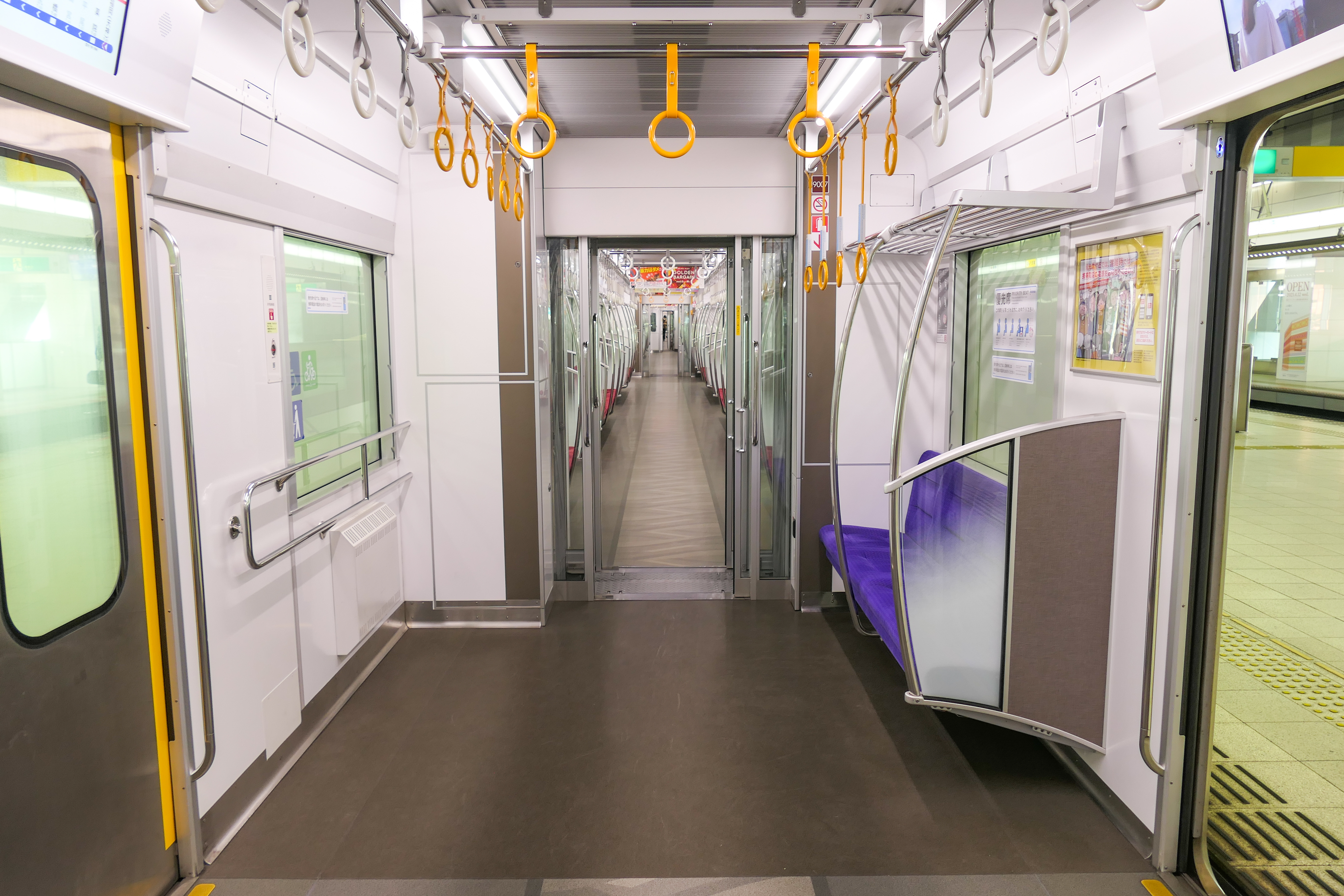
Priority seating with wheelchair space at left

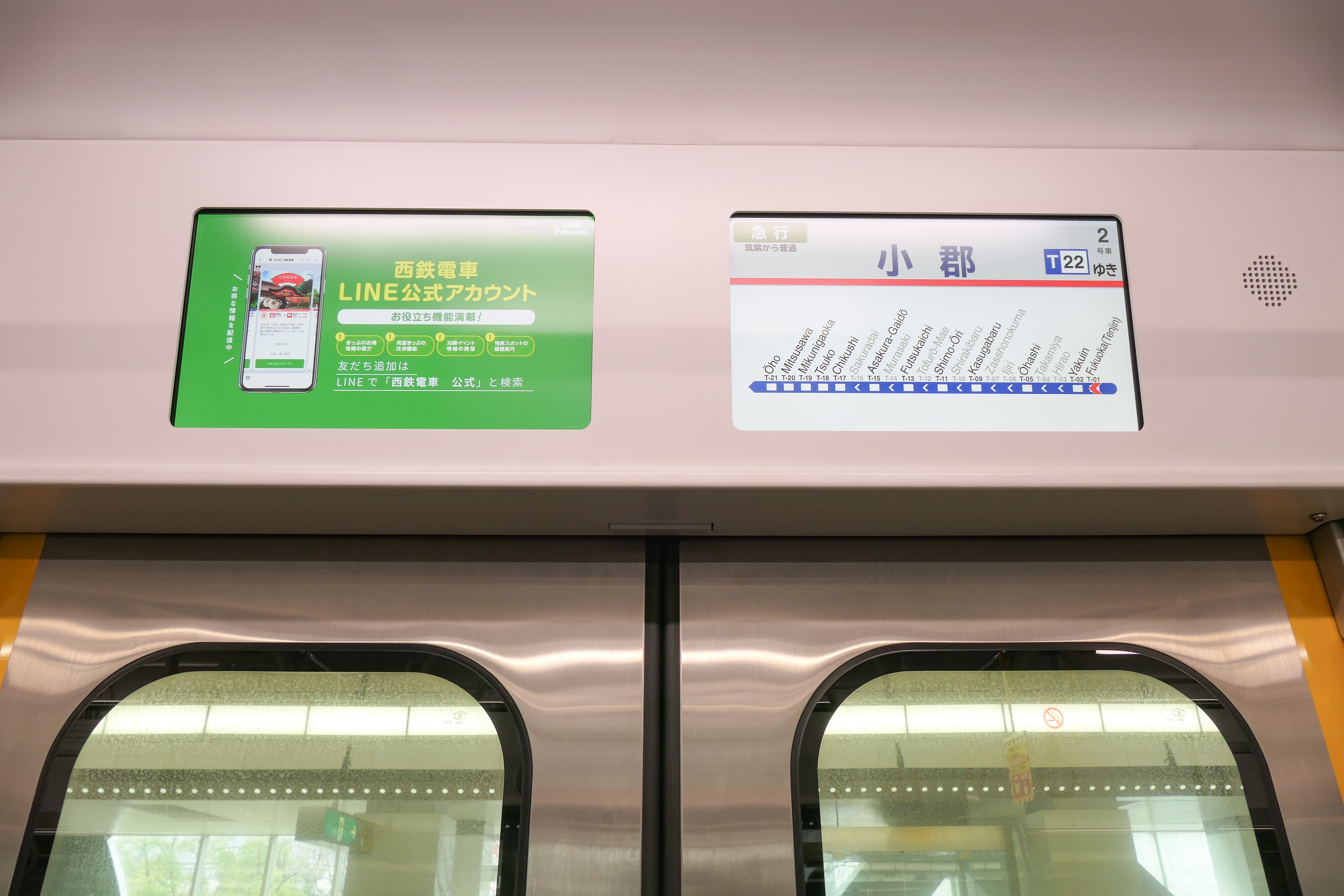
LCD information displays

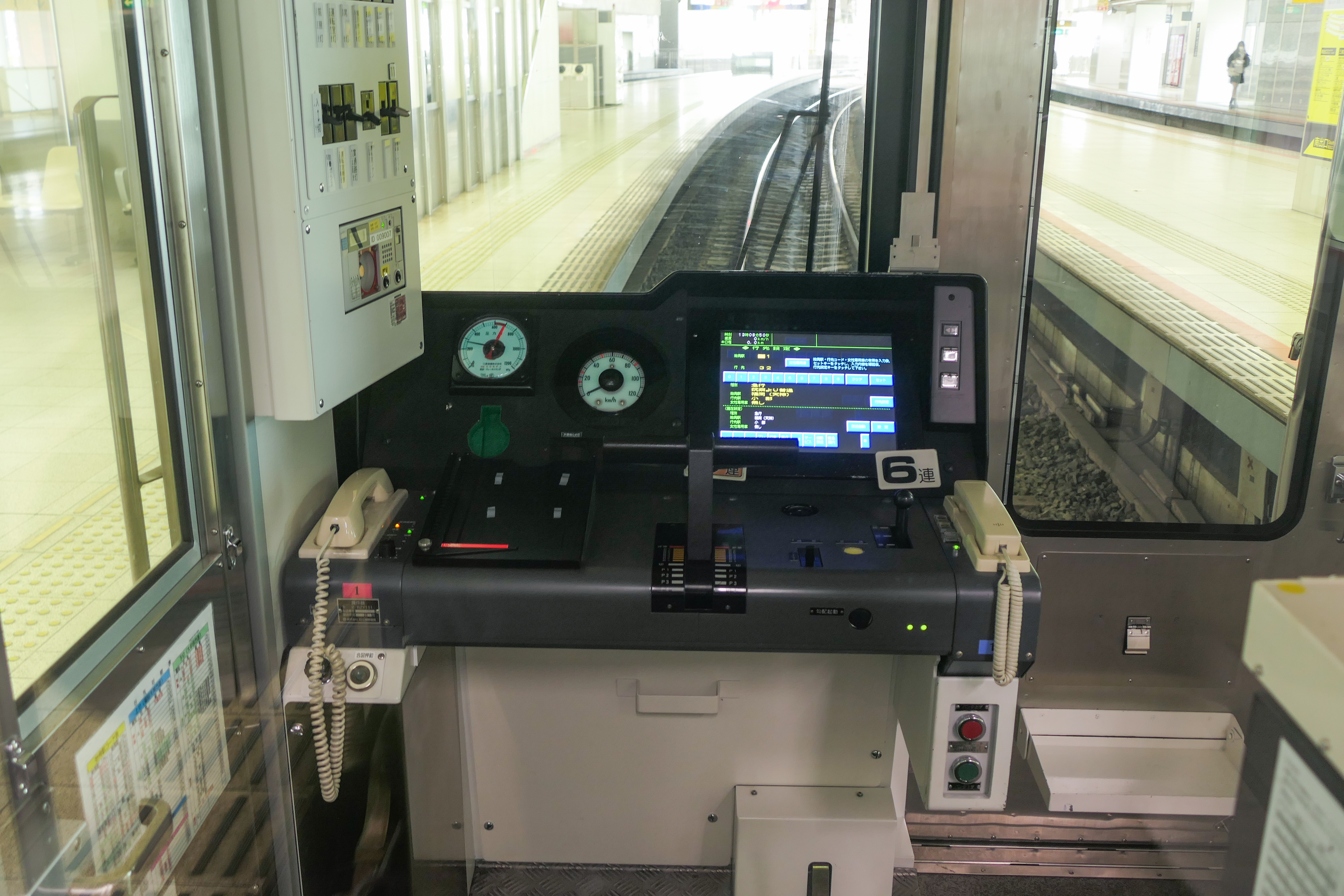
Driver's cab

== History ==
Details of the new trains were officially announced in February 2016. The first two trains (one three-car and one two-car set) entered revenue service on 20 March 2017.

In 2019 a three-car set and a pair of two-car sets were delivered.
