= Dazaifu Line =

Railway line in Fukuoka prefecture, Japan

- A Nishitetsu 3000 series train at Dazaifu Station (shot on August 2019)

Overview
- Native name: 太宰府線
- Status: In service
- Owner: Nishi-Nippon Railroad
- Line number: D
- Locale: Fukuoka Prefecture, Japan
- Termini: Nishitetsu Futsukaichi; Dazaifu
- Stations: 3

Service
- Type: Heavy rail
- System: Nishi-Nippon Railroad
- Operator: Nishi-Nippon Railroad

History
- Opened: 1 May 1902

Technical
- Line length: 2.4 km (1.5 mi)
- Num of tracks: Single
- Track gauge: 1,435 mm (4 ft 8 1/2 in) standard gauge
- Electrification: Overhead line, 1,500 V DC
- Operating speed: 75 km/h (47 mph)

The Dazaifu Line (太宰府線, Dazaifu-sen) is a Japanese rail line operated by Nishi-Nippon Railroad (Nishitetsu) that connects Chikushino City and Dazaifu City in Fukuoka Prefecture.

== History ==
The Dazaifu Horse Tramway Co. opened a 915mm gauge line from Futsukaichi to Dazaifu in 1902, and introduced steam locomotion on the line in 1913.

In 1927 the line was electrified at 1500 VDC and converted to 1435mm gauge, and was taken over by the Kyushu Railway Co. in 1934.

In 1942 the Kyushu Railway Co merged with the Kyushu Electric Railway Co., becoming the Nishi-Nippon (translates as West Japan) Railway Co.

== Stations ==
Station name	Japanese	Total distance	Transfers	Location	
T 13 Nishitetsu Futsukaichi	西鉄二日市	0 km	Nishitetsu Tenjin Ōmuta Line	Chikushino	Fukuoka
D 01 Nishitetsu Gojō	西鉄五条	1.4 km		Dazaifu	Fukuoka
D 02 Dazaifu	太宰府	2.4 km		Dazaifu	Fukuoka
