= Nishitetsu Gojō Station =

Railway station in Dazaifu, Fukuoka Prefecture, Japan

Nishitetsu Gojō Station 西鉄五条駅
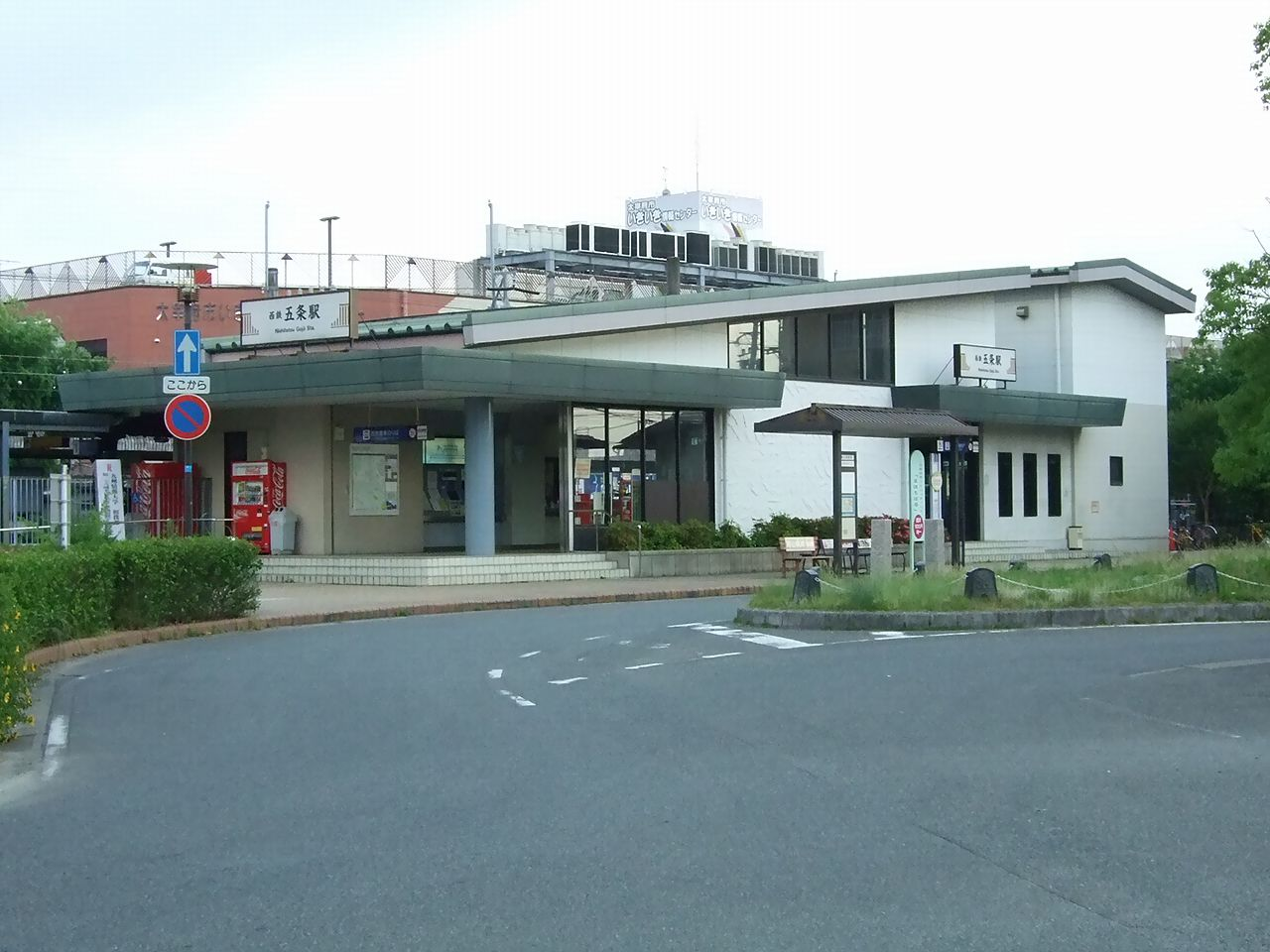
- Nishitetsu Gojō Station in 2009

General information
- Location: 8-1, Gojō 2-chōme, Dazaifu-shi, Fukuoka-ken; Japan
- Coordinates: 33°30′41″N 130°31′35″E
- Operator: Nishi-Nippon Railroad
- Line: ■ Dazaifu Line
- Platforms: 1 side + 1 island platforms

Other information
- Station code: D01
- Website: Official website

History
- Opened: 5 May 1902
- Former names: Gojō (1928; 1931-1942); Gojō guchi (1928-1931); Sekeiba-mae (to 1948)

Passengers
- FY2022: 15,053

Services
Preceding station	Nishitetsu	Following station
Nishitetsu Futsukaichi Terminus	Dazaifu Line	Dazaifu Terminus
Location
- Location within Fukuoka Prefecture Location within Japan

Nishitetsu Gojō Station (西鉄五条駅, Nishitetsu-Gojō-eki) is a passenger railway station located in the city of Dazaifu Fukuoka Prefecture, Japan. It is operated by the private transportation company Nishi-Nippon Railroad (NNR), and has station number D01.

== Lines ==
The station is served by the Nishitetsu Dazaifu Line and is 1.4 kilometers from the terminus of the line at for Futsukaichi.

== Station layout ==
The station consists of one island platform and one side platform serving three tracks.

== Platforms ==
1	■ Nishitetsu Dazaifu Line	for Dazaifu
2, 3	■ Nishitetsu Dazaifu Line	< siding >
4	■ Nishitetsu Dazaifu Line	for Futsukaichi

== History ==
The station opened on 1 May 1902 as Gojō Station (五条駅) on the Dazaifu Horse Railway, which used horse-drawn carriages on a railway with a gauge of 914mm. The motive source was changed from horse to steam on 20 January 1912, and the track was changed to 1435 mm gauge and electrified by 24 September 1924. The station was abolished on 24 September 1927, but reopened the following year on 3 May 1928 as Gojōguchi Station (五条口駅). It was relocated and reverted to its original name on 17 October 1931. It was renamed Sekeiba-mae Station (種鶏場前駅) on 10 July 1942. The company merged with the Kyushu Electric Tram Railway on 22 September 1942 to become Nishi-Nippon Railway. It was renamed to its present name on 25 October 1948.

== Passenger statistics ==
In fiscal 2022, the station was used by 15,053 passengers daily.

== Surrounding area ==
- Dazaifu City Hall
- Chikushi Jogakuen University
- Kanzeon-ji

== See also ==
- List of railway stations in Japan
