= Sakuradai Station (Fukuoka) =

Railway station in Chikushino, Fukuoka Prefecture, Japan

Sakuradai Station 桜台駅
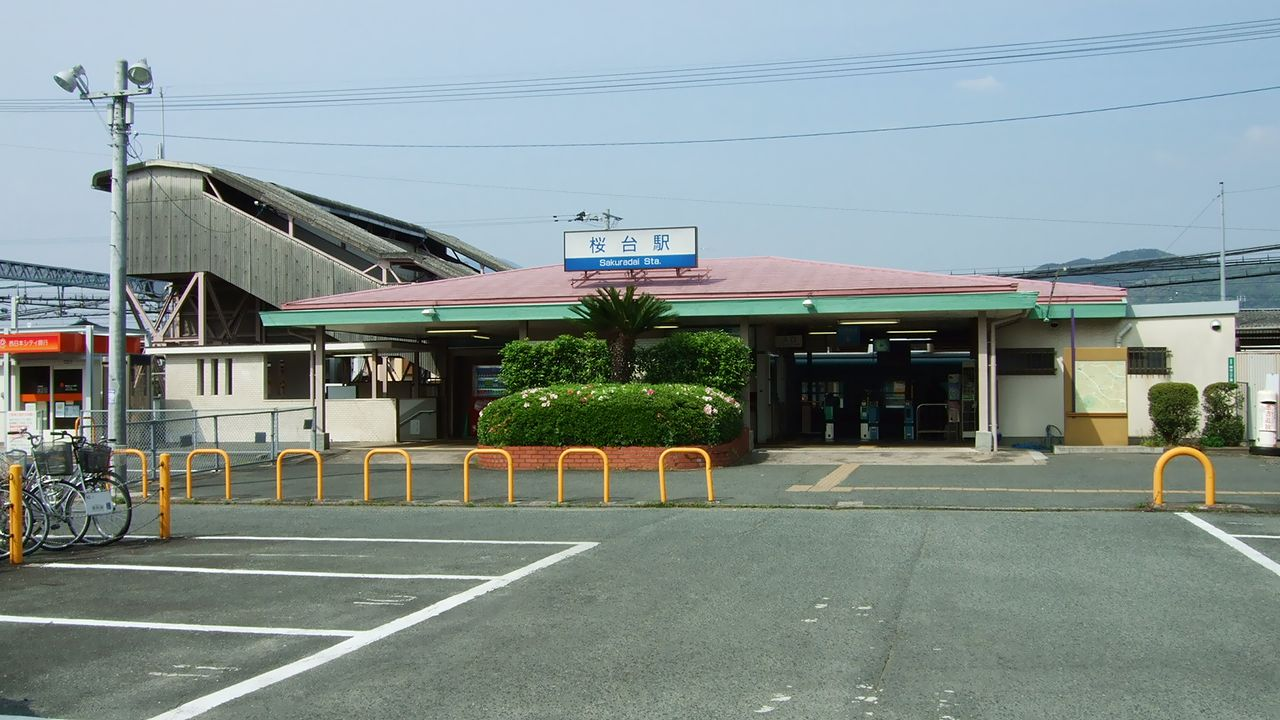
- Sakuradai Station in 2009

General information
- Location: Sakuradai 2-chōme, Chikushino-shi, Fukuoka-ken 818-0063; Japan
- Coordinates: 33°28′18″N 130°32′32″E
- Operator: Nishi-Nippon Railroad
- Line: ■ Tenjin Ōmuta Line
- Distance: 19.4 km from Nishitetsu Fukuoka (Tenjin)
- Platforms: 2 side platforms
- Connections

Other information
- Station code: T16
- Website: Official website

History
- Opened: 1 March 1971

Passengers
- FY2022: 1749

Services
| Preceding station | Nishitetsu | Following station |
|---|---|---|
| Asakuragaidō towards Nishitetsu Fukuoka (Tenjin) | Tenjin Ōmuta Line Local | Chikushi towards Ōmuta |
Location
- Location within Fukuoka Prefecture Location within Japan

Sakuradai Station (桜台駅, Sakuradai-eki) is a passenger railway station located in the city of Chikushino, Fukuoka, Japan. It is operated by the private transportation company Nishi-Nippon Railroad (NNR), and has station number T16.

== Lines ==
The station is served by the Nishitetsu Tenjin Ōmuta Line and is 19.4 kilometers from the starting point of the line at Nishitetsu Fukuoka (Tenjin) Station.

== Station layout ==
The station consists of a two opposed ground-level side platforms connected to station building with an footbridge. The station is staffed.

== Platforms ==
| 1 | ■ Tenjin Ōmuta Line | for Kurume, Yanagawa and Ōmuta |
| 2 | ■ Tenjin Ōmuta Line | for Futsukaichi,Fukuoka |

== History ==
The station opened on 1 March 1971.

== Passenger statistics ==
In fiscal 2022, the station was used by 1749 passengers daily.

== Surrounding area ==
This station is located in the center of Chikushino City. The area around the station is not an old village, but a residential area that was developed as a commuter town for Fukuoka City after the 1970s, and there are no large-scale commercial facilities. About 300m west of the station, the old National Route 3 (Prefectural Route 77) runs parallel to the Tenjin Omuta Line. National Route 3 straddles the Tenjin Omuta Line about 500m northwest of the station.

== See also ==
- List of railway stations in Japan
