= Kasugabaru Station =

Railway station in Kasuga, Fukuoka Prefecture, Japan

Kasugabaru Station 春日原駅
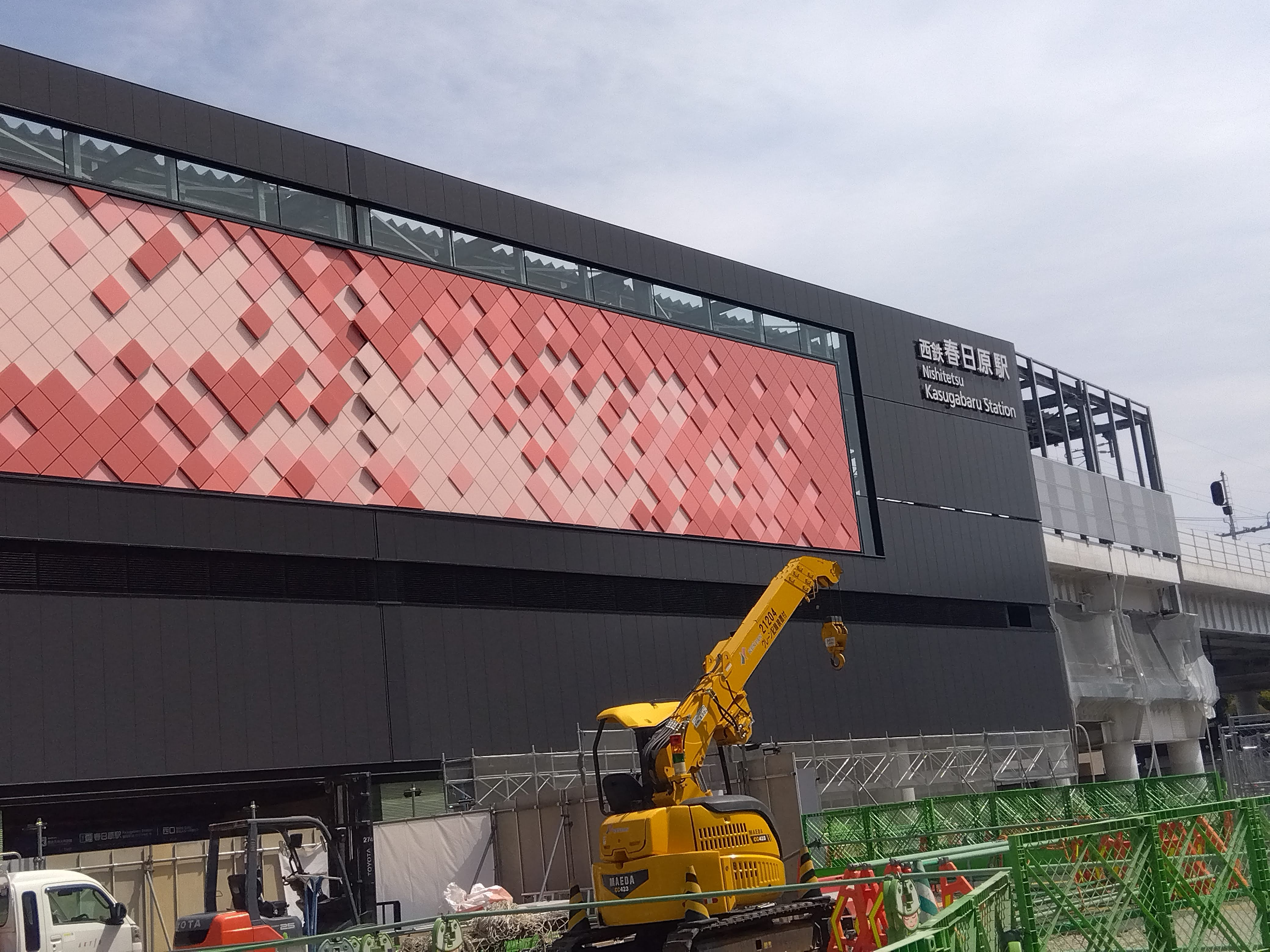
- Western façade in March 2025

General information
- Location: Kasugabaru-Higashimachi 1-chōme, Kasuga-shi, Fukuoka-ken; Japan
- Coordinates: 33°32′17″N 130°28′24″E
- Operator: Nishi-Nippon Railroad
- Line: ■ Tenjin Ōmuta Line
- Platforms: 1 island platform
- Connections: Bus stop

Construction
- Structure type: Elevated

Other information
- Station code: T09
- Website: Official website

History
- Opened: 12 April 1924

Passengers
- FY2022: 20,274

Services
Preceding station	Nishitetsu	Following station
Sakuranamiki towards Nishitetsu Fukuoka (Tenjin)	Tenjin Ōmuta Line Local	Shirakibaru towards Ōmuta
Ōhashi towards Nishitetsu Fukuoka (Tenjin)	Tenjin Ōmuta Line Express	Shimoōri towards Ōmuta
Ōhashi towards Nishitetsu Fukuoka (Tenjin)	Tenjin Ōmuta Line Limited Express	Nishitetsu Futsukaichi towards Ōmuta
Location
- Location within Fukuoka Prefecture Location within Japan

Kasugabaru Station (春日原駅, Kasugabaru-eki) is a passenger railway station located in the city of Kasuga, Fukuoka, Japan. It is operated by the private transportation company Nishi-Nippon Railroad (NNR), and has station number T09.

== Lines ==
The station is served by the Nishitetsu Tenjin Ōmuta Line and is 9.5 kilometers from the starting point of the line at Nishitetsu Fukuoka (Tenjin) Station.

== Station layout ==
The station is an elevated station with two island platforms and four lines. In the morning and evening, there are local and limited express connections, and local and express connections. The effective length of the platform is 8 cars. The station is staffed.

== Platforms ==
1	■ Tenjin Ōmuta Line	for Futsukaichi, Kurume and Ōmuta
3, 4	■ Tenjin Ōmuta Line	for Yakuin and Fukuoka

== History ==
The station was opened on 12 April 1924. On 28 August 2022, the facilities were moved to a new elevated station as part of a grade separation project.

== Passenger statistics ==
In fiscal 2022, the station was used by 20,274 passengers daily.

== Surrounding area ==
The station is located in Kasuga City, about 200 meters east from the station is the border with Onojo City.

== See also ==
- List of railway stations in Japan
