= Nishitetsu 3000 series =

Japanese train type

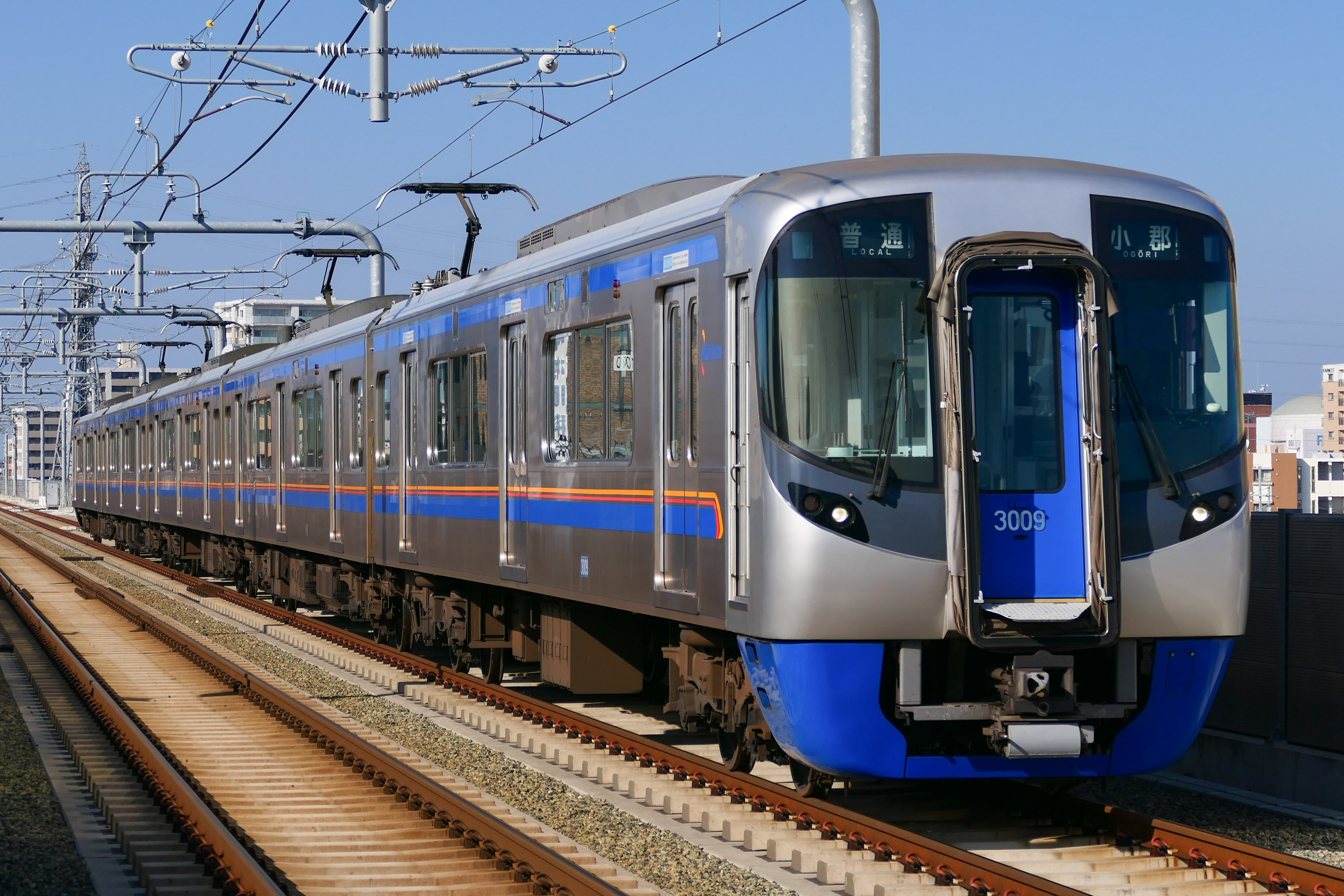
- Five-car set 3009 in January 2024
- In service: 2006–Present
- Manufacturer: Kawasaki Heavy Industries
- Constructed: 2006–Present
- Entered service: 25 March 2006
- Number built: 60 vehicles (20 sets)
- Number in service: 60 vehicles (20 sets)
- Formation: 2/3/5 cars per trainset
- Operator: Nishitetsu
- Line served: Nishitetsu Tenjin Ōmuta Line

Specifications
- Car body construction: Stainless steel
- Car length: 19,500 mm (64 ft 0 in)
- Width: 2,724 mm (8 ft 11.2 in)
- Doors: 3 pairs per side
- Maximum speed: 110 km/h (68 mph)
- Traction system: Variable frequency (IGBT)
- Power supply: 1,500 V
- Current collection: Overhead catenary
- Track gauge: 1,435 mm (4 ft 8 1/2 in)

The Nishitetsu 3000 series (西鉄3000形) is an electric multiple unit (EMU) train type operated by the private railway operator Nishi-Nippon Railroad (Nishitetsu) in Japan since 2006.

== Formations ==
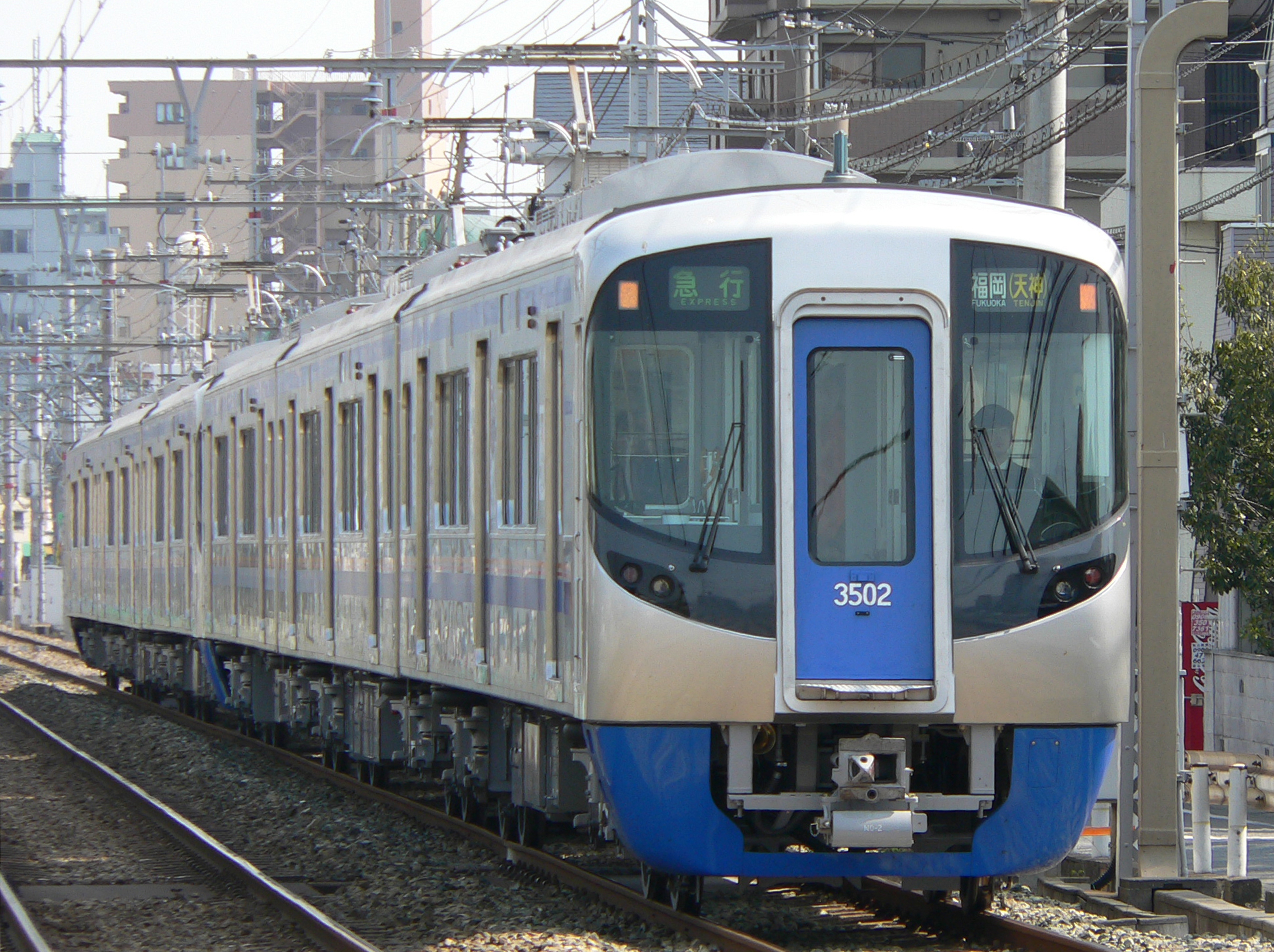
Two 3-car sets in March 2006

The trains are formed as two-car, three-car, and five-car formations. As of 2021, the fleet consists of eight two-car sets, eight three-car sets, and four five-car sets (60 vehicles in total), formed as shown below.

=== Two-car sets ===
| Designation | Mc | Tc |
| Numbering | 31xx | 35xx |
| Capacity (seated/total) | 44/118 | 44/118 |

The Mc car has two single-arm pantographs.

=== Three-car sets ===
| Designation | Tc1 | M | Tc2 |
| Numbering | 30xx | 33xx | 35xx |
| Capacity (seated/total) | 44/118 | 56/131 | 44/118 |

The M car has two single-arm pantographs.

=== Five-car sets ===
| Designation | Tc1 | M1 | T | M2 | Tc2 |
| Numbering | 30xx | 33xx | 34xx | 36xx | 35xx |
| Capacity (seated/total) | 44/118 | 56/131 | 56/131 | 56/131 | 44/118 |

The M1 and M2 cars each have two single-arm pantographs.

== Interior ==
Passenger accommodation consists of transverse 2+2 abreast seating with seat backs that can be flipped over to face the direction of travel.

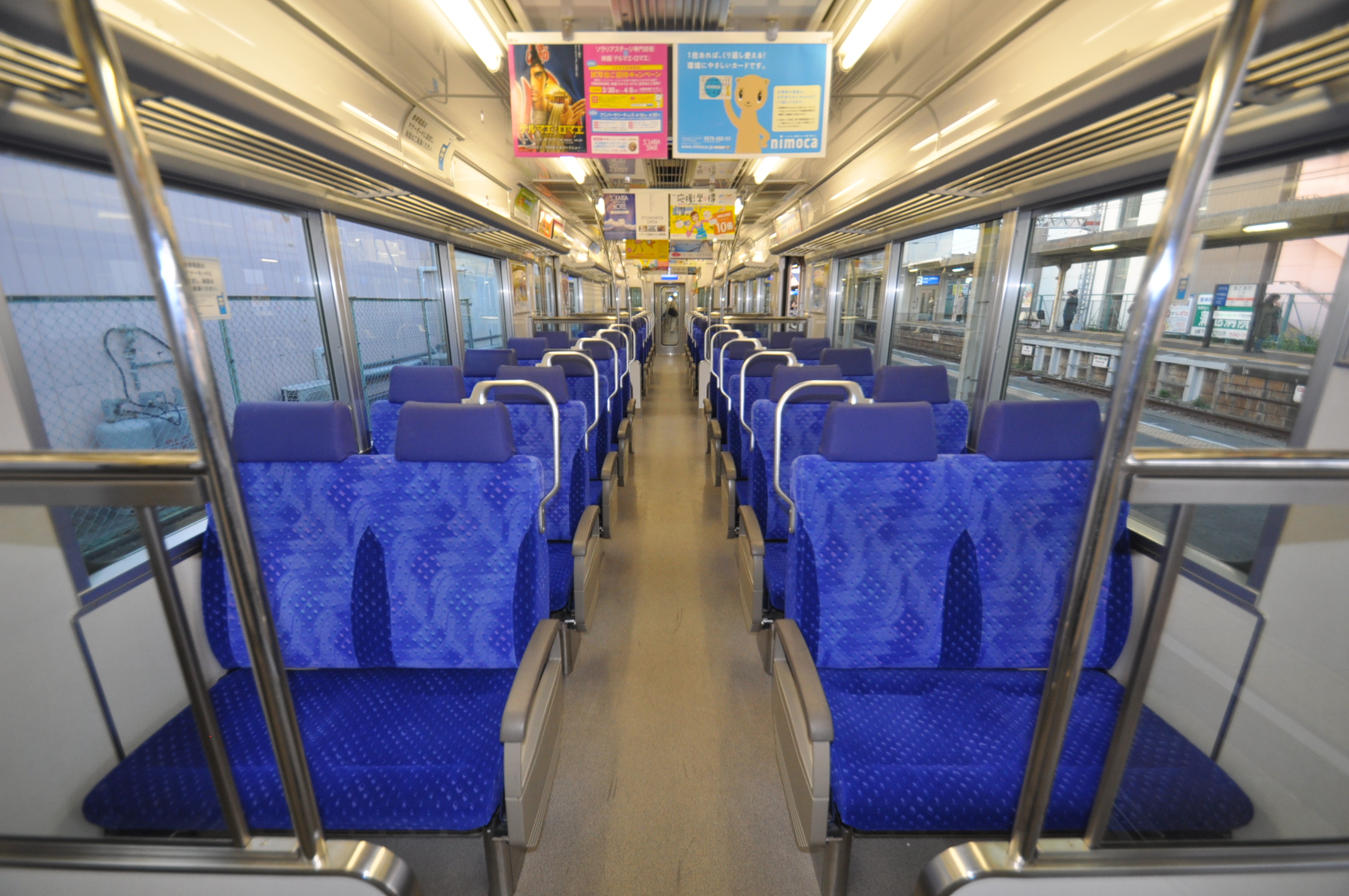
Interior view

== History ==
Introduced in 2006, the 3000 series was the first stainless steel bodied design introduced by Nishitetsu.

The final sets to be built, which were two 2-car sets (3119 and 3120), were delivered in January 2016. Any further Nishitetsu rolling stock to be built would be classified under the 9000 series designation.

In January 2026, Nishitetsu announced plans to implement an N Liner (Nライナー) reserved-seating service on the Tenjin Ōmuta Line using 5-car 3000 series sets from the start of a revised timetable on 14 March.
