= Dazaifu Station =

Railway station in Dazaifu, Fukuoka Prefecture, Japan

Dazaifu Station 太宰府駅
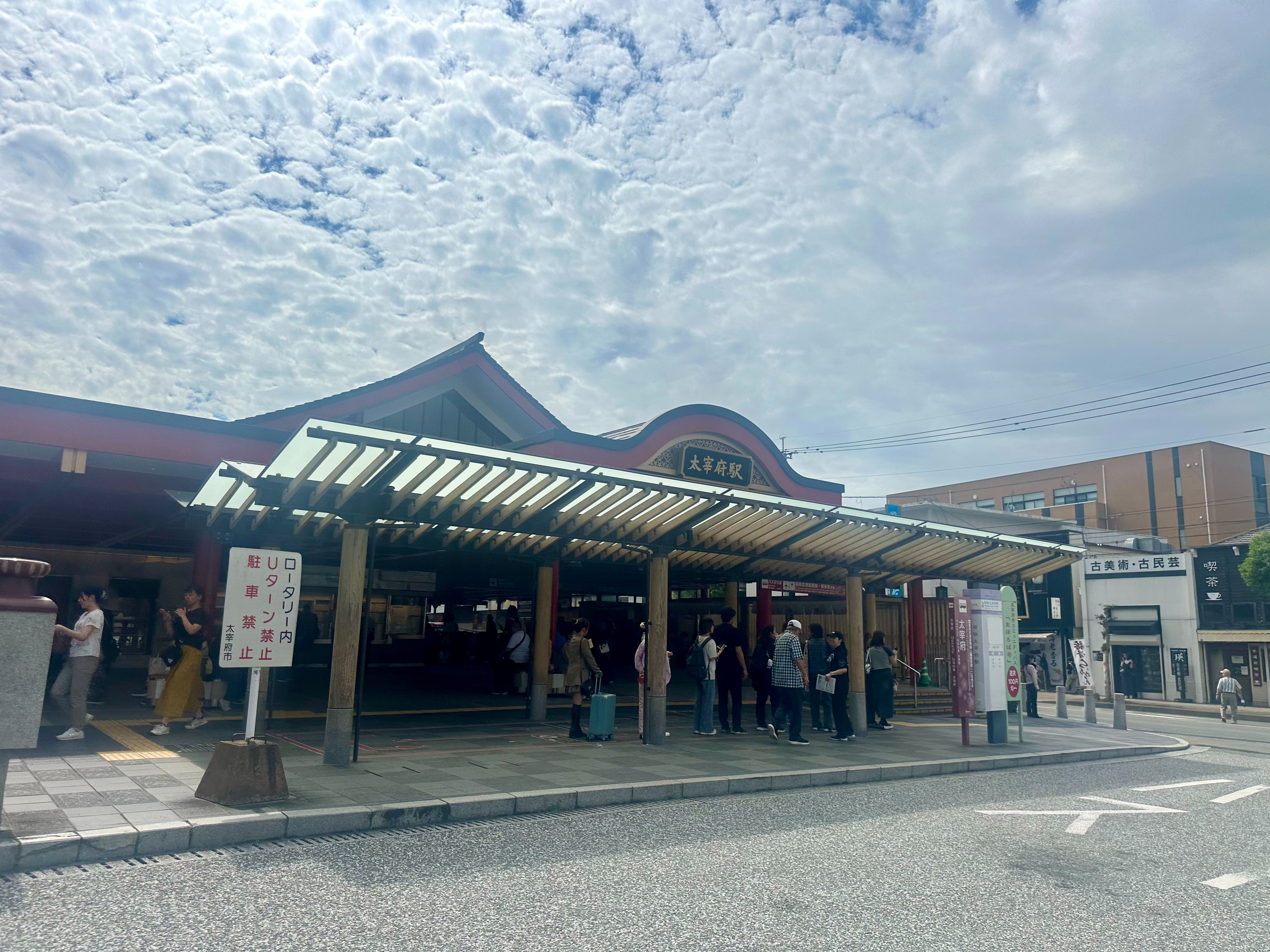
- Dazaifu Station, 2024

General information
- Location: Saifu 2-chome, Dazaifu-shi, Fukuoka-ken; Japan
- Coordinates: 33°31′8.53″N 130°31′53.07″E
- Operator: Nishi-Nippon Railroad
- Line: ■ Dazaifu Line
- Platforms: 2 bay platforms
- Connections: Bus terminal

Other information
- Station code: D02
- Website: Official website

History
- Opened: 5 May 1902

Passengers
- FY2022: 11,658

Services
| Preceding station | Nishitetsu | Following station |
|---|---|---|
| Nishitetsu Gojō towards Nishitetsu Futsukaichi | Dazaifu Line | Terminus |
Location
- Location within Fukuoka Prefecture Location within Japan

Dazaifu Station (太宰府駅, Dazaifu-eki) is a passenger railway station located in the city of Dazaifu, Fukuoka Fukuoka Prefecture, Japan. It is operated by the private transportation company Nishi-Nippon Railroad (NNR), and has station number D02.

== Lines ==
The station is the terminus of the Nishitetsu Dazaifu Line and is 2.4 kilometers from the opposing terminus of the line at for Futsukaichi.

== Station layout ==
The station consists of two bay platforms serving three tracks.

== Platforms ==
| 1 | ■ Nishitetsu Dazaifu Line | arriving passengers only |
| 2, 3 | ■ Nishitetsu Dazaifu Line | for Chihaya and for Futsukaichi |
| 4 | ■ Nishitetsu Dazaifu Line | arriving passengers only |

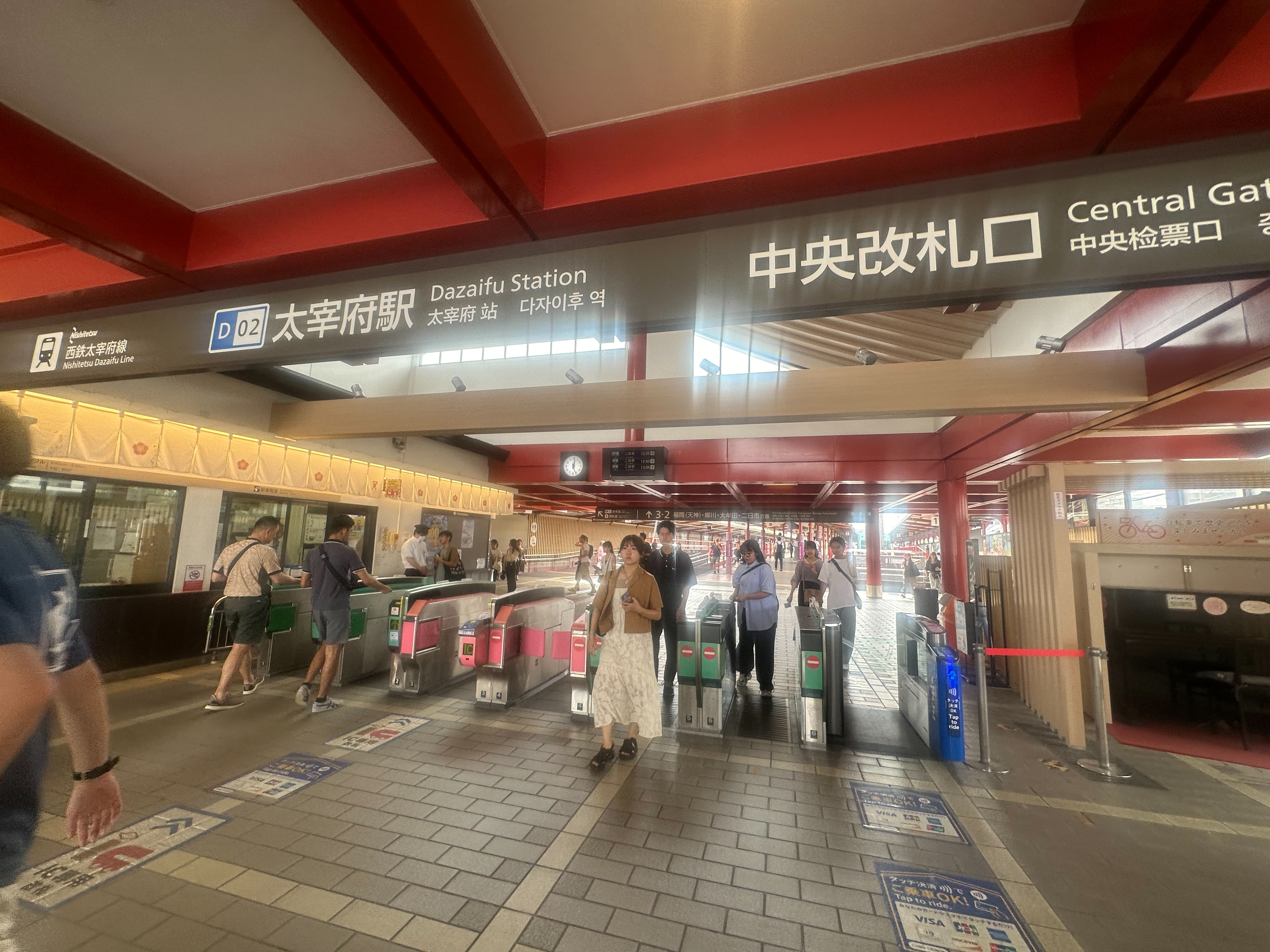
Exit gates

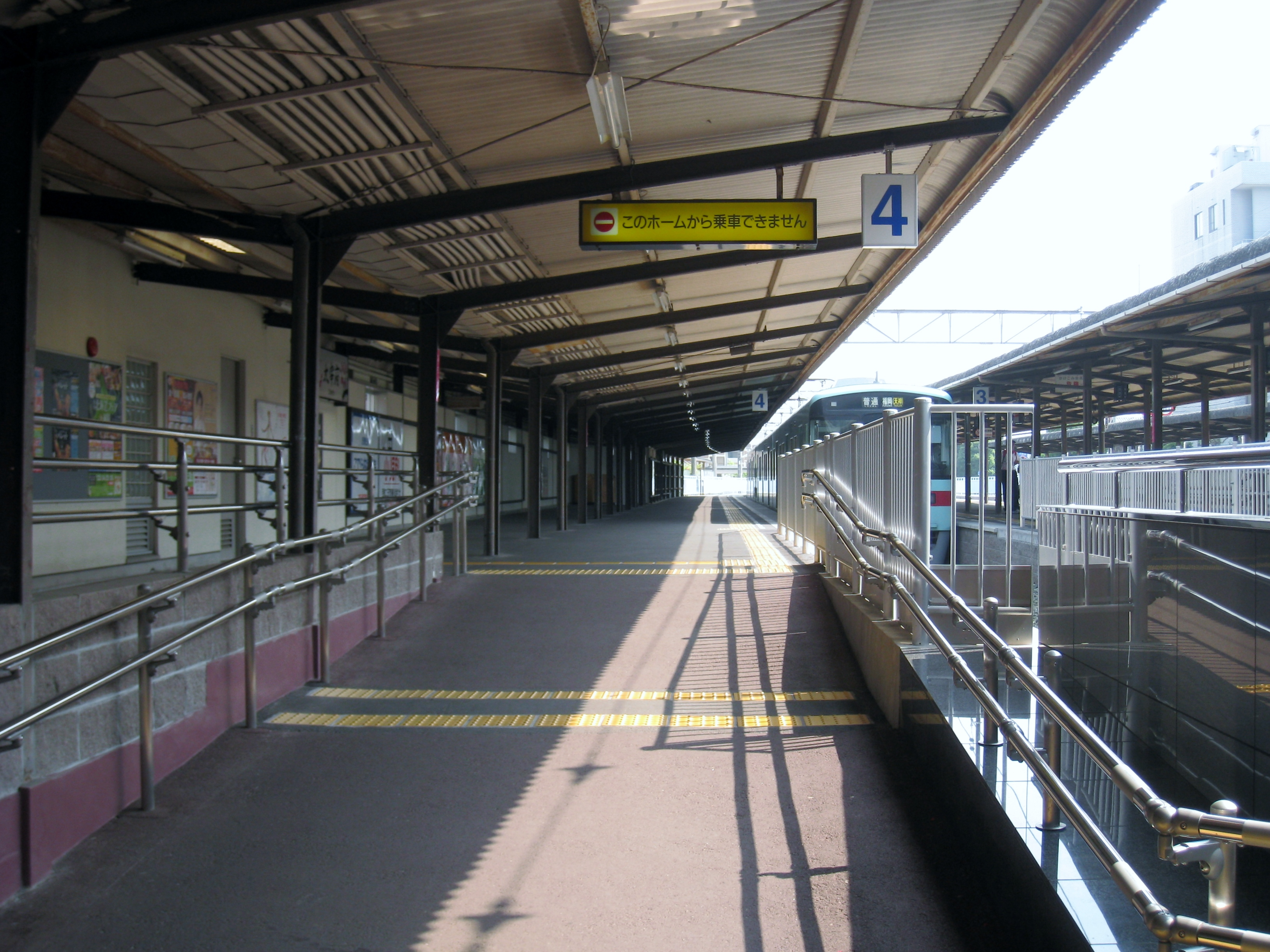
Platform 4

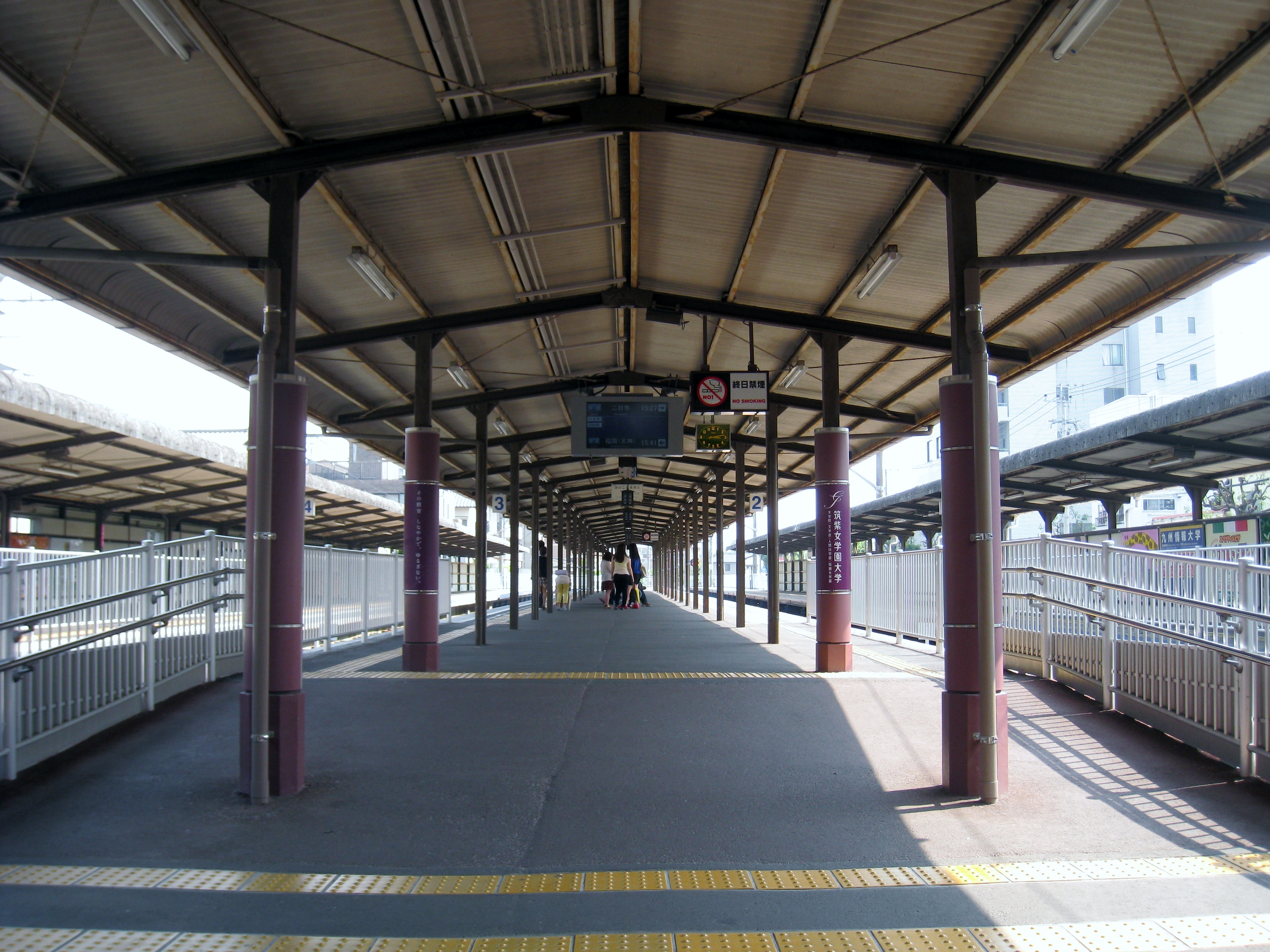
Platform 2, 3

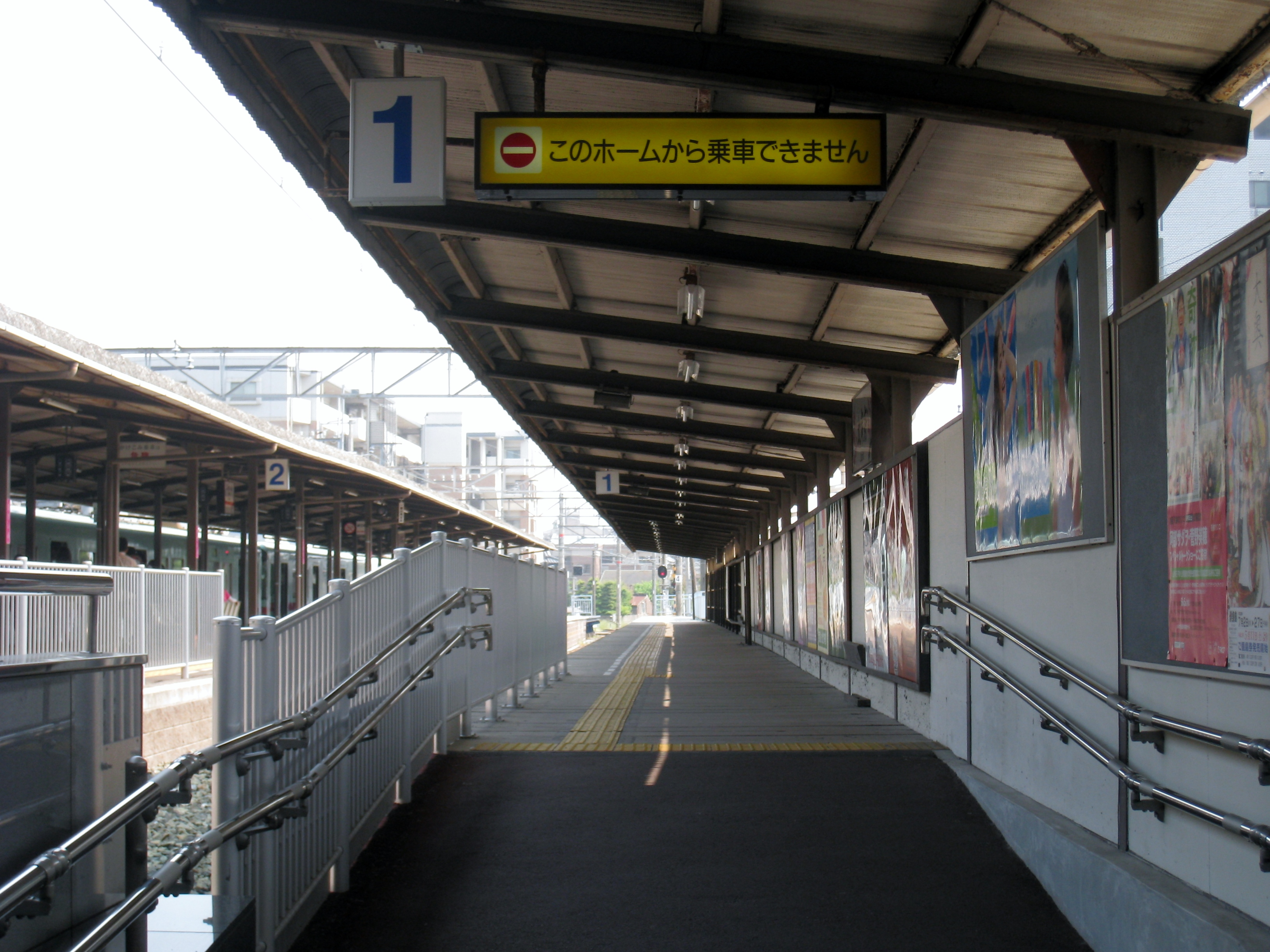
Platform 1

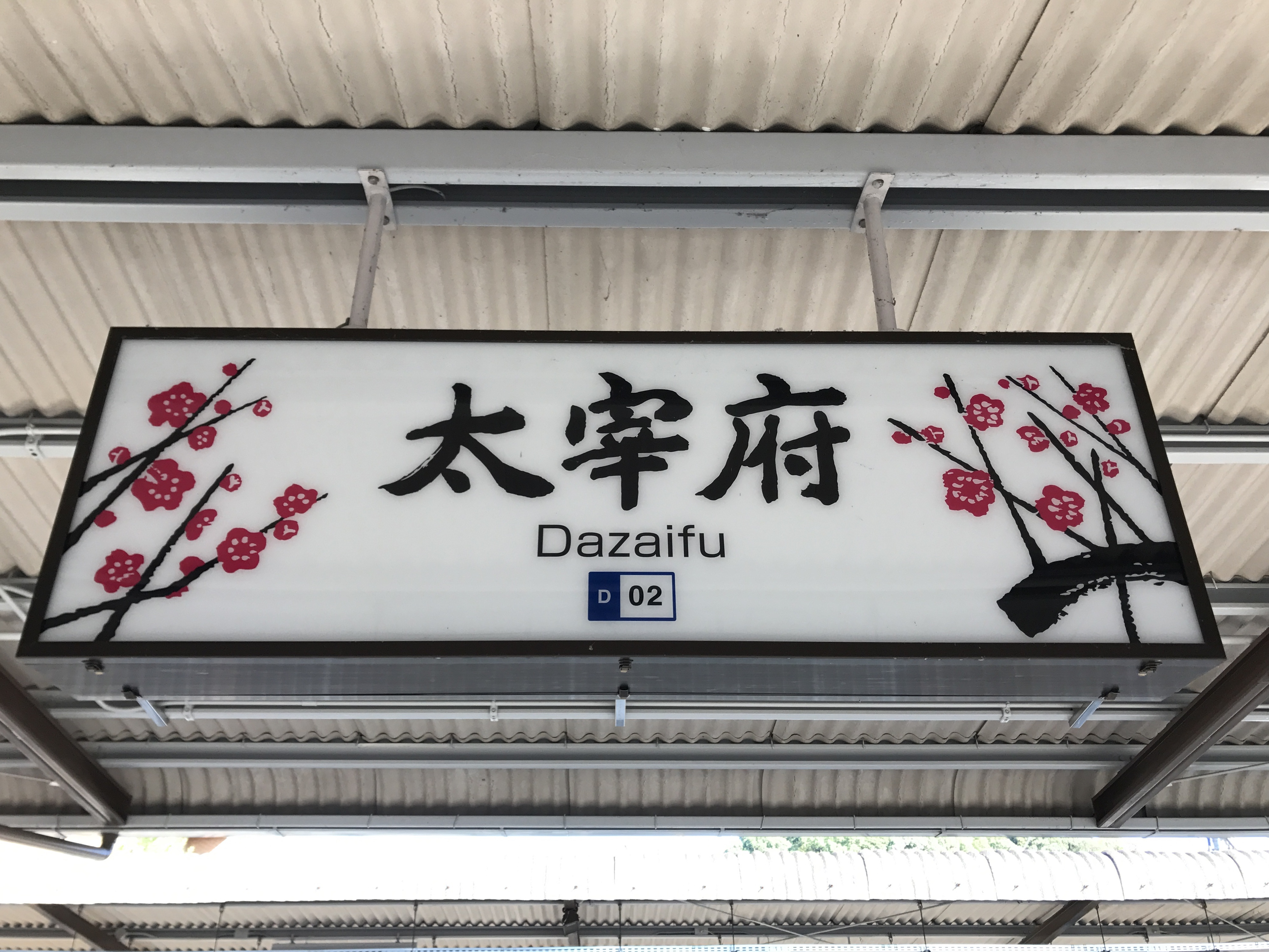
Station sign

== History ==
The station opened on 1 May 1902 as a station on the Dazaifu Horse Railway, which used horse-drawn carriages on a railway with a gauge of 914mm. The motive source was changed from horse to steam on 20 January 1912, and the track was changed to 1435 mm gauge and electrified by 24 September 1924. The company merged with the Kyushu Railway on 23 August 1934, which merged with the Kyushu Electric Tram RAilway on 19 September 1942 to become Nishi-Nippon Railway.

== Passenger statistics ==
In fiscal 2022, the station was used by 11,658 passengers daily.

== Surrounding area ==
The station is located slightly northeast of the center of Dazaifu City. There is a tourist information center inside the station and it is close to Dazaifu Tenmangu Shrine, making it a base for sightseeing in Dazaifu, but the neighboring Nishitetsu Gojo Station is closer to Dazaifu's downtown area and city hall.

== See also ==
- List of railway stations in Japan
