= Nishitetsu Futsukaichi Station =

Railway station in Chikushino, Fukuoka Prefecture, Japan

Nishitetsu Futsukaichi Station 西鉄二日市駅
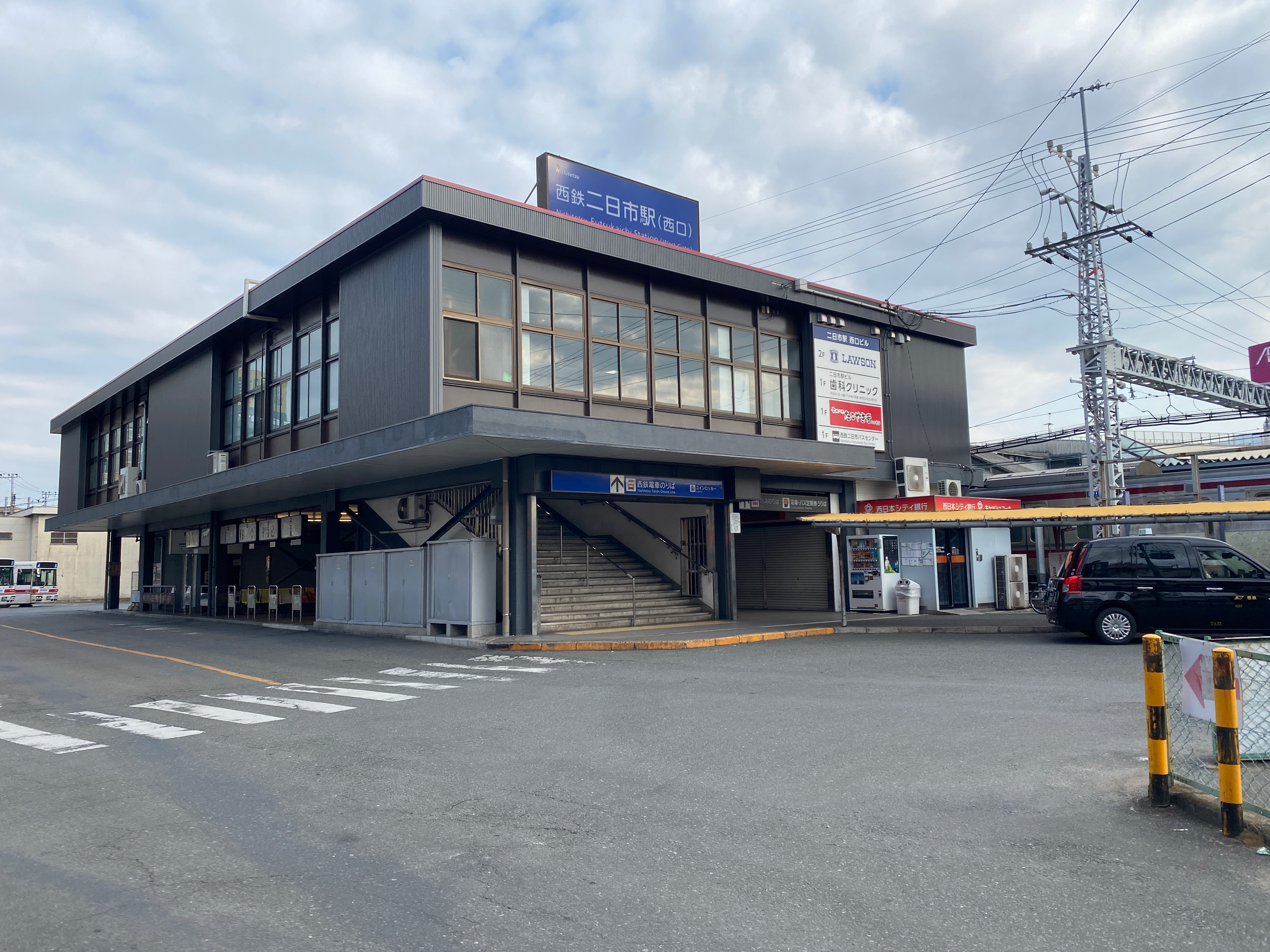
- Nishitetsu Futsukaichi Station west exit, March 2022

General information
- Location: 1-1 6-chōme Futsukaichi-Chūō, Chikushino-shi, Fukuoka-ken 818-0072; Japan
- Coordinates: 33°30′07″N 130°31′03″E
- Operator: Nishi-Nippon Railroad
- Lines: ■ Tenjin Ōmuta Line; ■ Dazaifu Line
- Distance: 15.2 km from Nishitetsu Fukuoka (Tenjin)
- Platforms: 4 island platforms
- Connections: Bus stop

Other information
- Station code: T13
- Website: Official website

History
- Opened: 12 April 1924
- Former names: Futsukaichi (to 1939), Kyutetsu Futsukaichi (to 1942)

Passengers
- FY2022: 16,904

Services
Preceding station	Nishitetsu	Following station
Tofurōmae towards Nishitetsu Fukuoka (Tenjin)	Tenjin Ōmuta Line Local	Murasaki towards Ōmuta
Shimoōri towards Nishitetsu Fukuoka (Tenjin)	Tenjin Ōmuta Line Express	Asakuragaidō towards Ōmuta
Kasugabaru towards Nishitetsu Fukuoka (Tenjin)	Tenjin Ōmuta Line Limited Express	Nishitetsu Kurume towards Ōmuta
Terminus	Dazaifu Line	Nishitetsu Gojō towards Dazaifu
Location
- Location within Fukuoka Prefecture Location within Japan

Nishitetsu Futsukaichi Station (西鉄二日市駅, Nishitetsu Futsukaichi-eki) is a junction passenger railway station located in the city of Chikushino, Fukuoka, Japan. It is operated by the private transportation company Nishi-Nippon Railroad (NNR), and has station number T13.

== Lines ==
The station is served by the Nishitetsu Tenjin Ōmuta Line and is 15.2 kilometers from the starting point of the line at Nishitetsu Fukuoka (Tenjin) Station. It is also the terminus of the 2.4 kilometer Dazaifu Line

== Station layout ==
The station consists of a four island platforms serving 7 tracks (as one of the island platforms, Platform 1, is only half-used). The platforms are connected by footbridges. The station is staffed.

== Platforms ==
1	■ Dazaifu Line	for Dazaifu
	■ Tenjin Ōmuta Line	for Fukuoka
2	■ Dazaifu Line	for Dazaifu (not in normal use)
3	■ Tenjin Ōmuta Line	for Fukuoka (not in normal use)
4	■ Dazaifu Line	for Dazaifu
	■ Tenjin Ōmuta Line	for Kurume, Yanagawa and Ōmuta
4	■ Tenjin Ōmuta Line	for Kurume, Yanagawa and Ōmuta
6,7	■ Tenjin Ōmuta Line	for Fukuoka

== History ==
The station opened on 12 April 1924 as Futsukaichi Station (二日市駅). It was renamed Kyutetsu Futsukaichi Station (九鉄二日市駅) on 1 July 1939. The company merged with the Kyushu Electric Tramway on 19 September 1942. The company changed its name to Nishi-Nippon Railway three days later, on 22 September 1942 and the station renamed to its present name.

== Passenger statistics ==
In fiscal 2022, the station was used by 16,904 passengers daily.

== Surrounding area ==
The station is located in the southern part of Chikushino City. There are residential areas surrounding the station.

- Chikushino City Chikushi Elementary School
- Chikushino City Chikuyama Junior High School
- Chikushino City Hall Chikushi Branch

== See also ==
- List of railway stations in Japan
