= Hanabatake Station =

Railway station in Kurume, Fukuoka Prefecture, Japan

Hanabatake Station 花畑駅
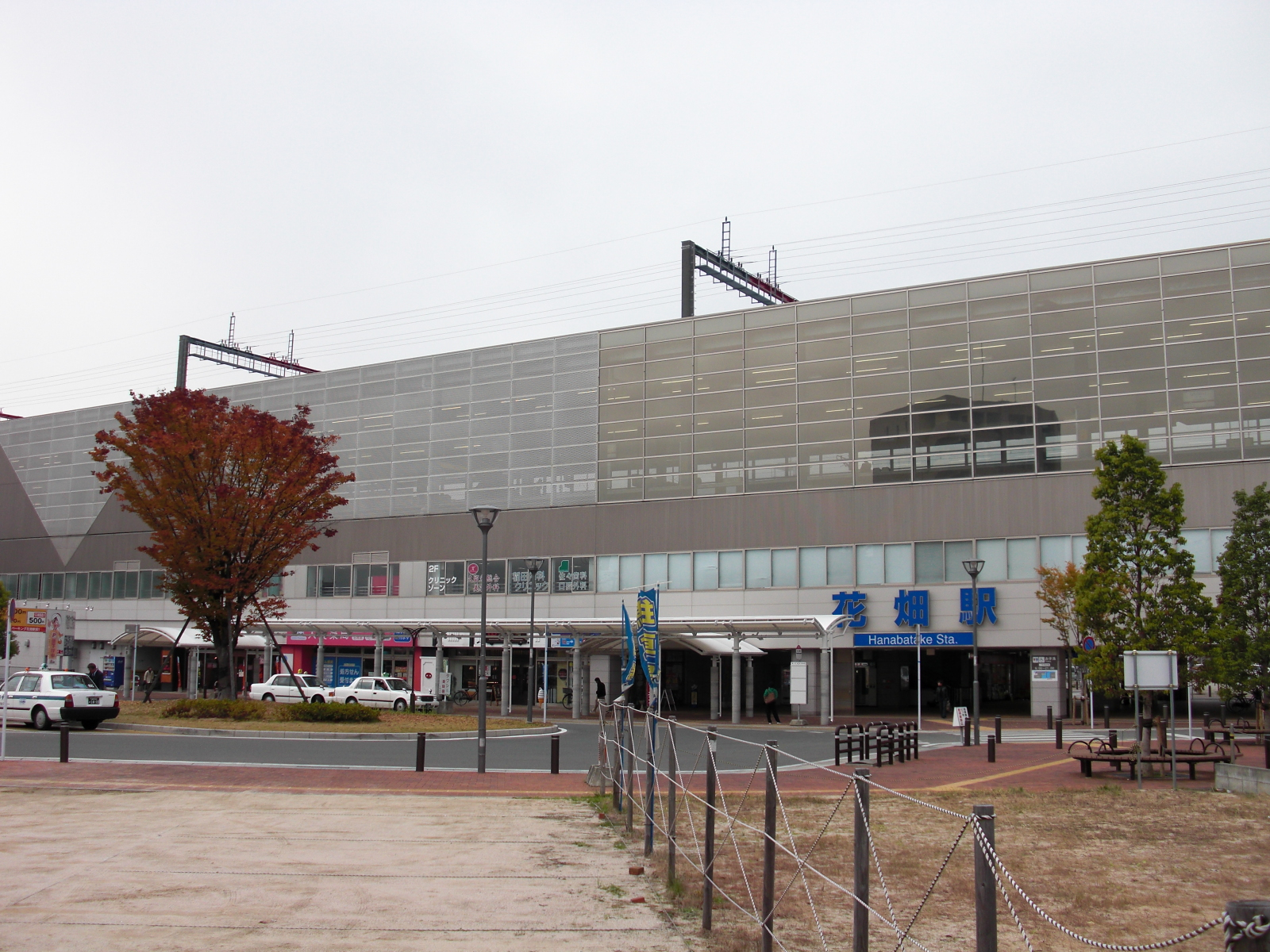
- Hanabatake Station building

General information
- Location: 1 Chome Hanabatake, Kurume-shi, Fukuoka-ken 830-0039; Japan
- Coordinates: 33°18′21.86″N 130°30′55.09″E
- Operator: Nishi-Nippon Railroad
- Line: ■ Tenjin Ōmuta Line
- Distance: 39.5 km from Nishitetsu Fukuoka (Tenjin)
- Platforms: 2 island platforms
- Connections

Construction
- Structure type: Elevated

Other information
- Status: Staffed
- Station code: T28
- Website: Official website

History
- Opened: 26 October 1933

Passengers
- FY2022: 7370

Services
Preceding station	Nishitetsu	Following station
Nishitetsu Kurume towards Nishitetsu Fukuoka (Tenjin)	Tenjin Ōmuta Line Local	St. Mary's Hospital towards Ōmuta
Nishitetsu Kurume towards Nishitetsu Fukuoka (Tenjin)	Tenjin Ōmuta Line Express	Daizenji towards Ōmuta
Nishitetsu Kurume towards Nishitetsu Fukuoka (Tenjin)	Tenjin Ōmuta Line Limited Express	Daizenji towards Ōmuta
Location
- Location within Fukuoka Prefecture Location within Japan

Hanabatake Station (花畑駅, Hanabatake-eki) is a passenger railway station located in the city of Kurume, Fukuoka, Japan. It is operated by the private transportation company Nishi-Nippon Railroad (NNR), and has station number T28.

== Lines ==
The station is served by the Nishitetsu Tenjin Ōmuta Line and is 39.5 kilometers from the starting point of the line at Nishitetsu Fukuoka (Tenjin) Station.

== Station layout ==
The station consists of a two elevated opposed island platforms with the station building underneath. The station is staffed.

== Platforms ==
1, 2	■ Tenjin Ōmuta Line	for Nishitetsu Yanagawa and Ōmuta
3, 4	■ Tenjin Ōmuta Line	for Nishitetsu Kurume, Nishitetsu Futsukaichi and Fukuoka

== History ==
The station opened on 26 October 1933 as a station on the Kyushu Railway. The company merged with the Kyushu Electric Tramway on 19 September 1942. The company changed its name to Nishi-Nippon Railway three days later, on 22 September 1942.

== Passenger statistics ==
In fiscal 2022, the station was used by 7370 passengers daily.

== Surrounding area ==
- Naito Hospital
- Horikawa Hospital
- Erpia Kurume (Kurume City Consumer Affairs Center, Gender Equality Promotion Center, Lifelong Learning Center)
- Kurume City Buried Cultural Properties Center

== See also ==
- List of railway stations in Japan
