= Yasutake Station =

Railway station in Kurume, Fukuoka Prefecture, Japan

Yasutake Station 安武駅
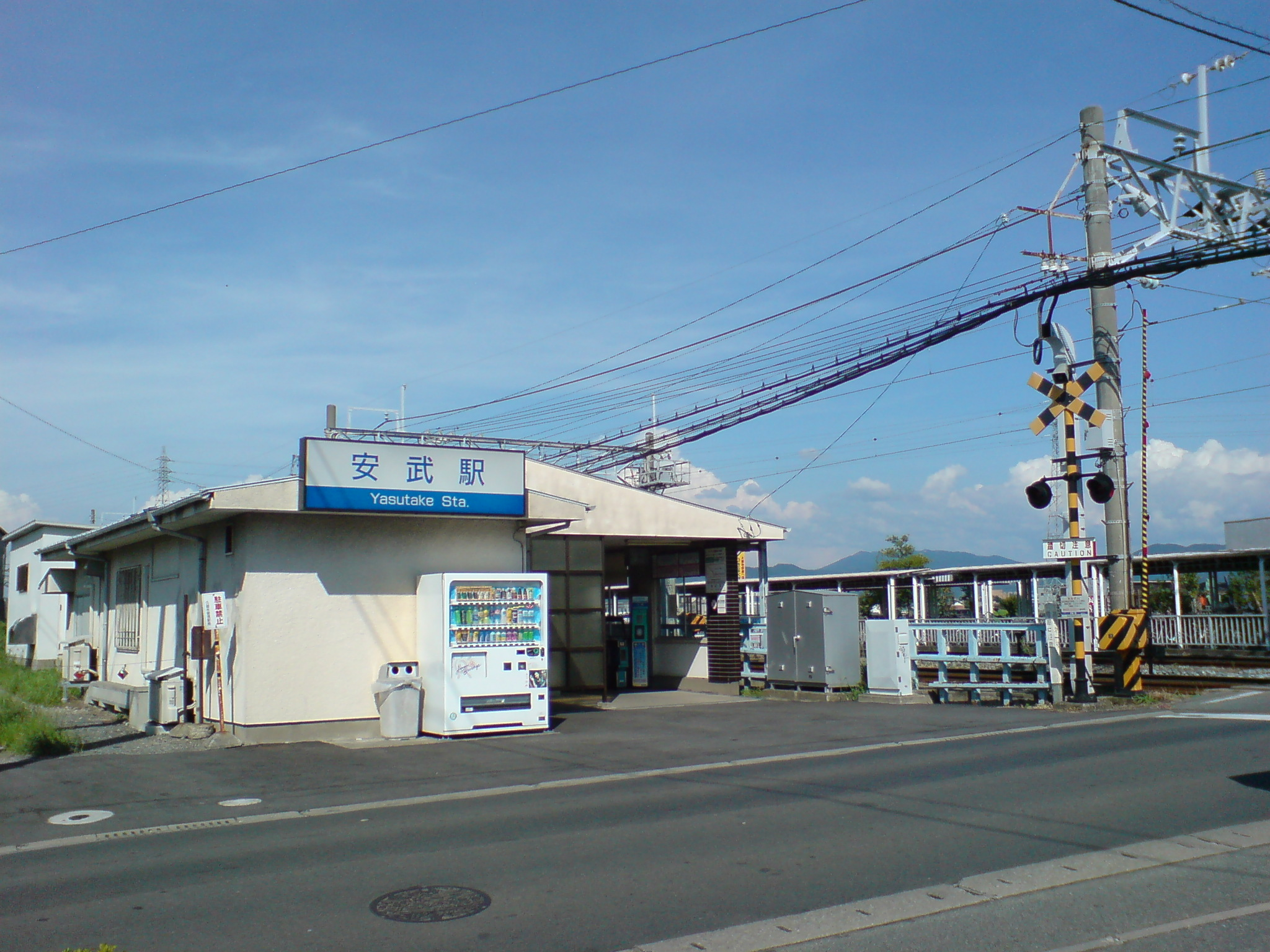
- Yasutake Station building

General information
- Location: 3327 Yasutakehon Yasutakemachi, Kurume-shi, Fukuoka-ken 830-0072; Japan
- Coordinates: 33°17′9.77″N 130°29′19.08″E
- Operator: Nishi-Nippon Railroad
- Line: ■ Tenjin Ōmuta Line
- Distance: 42.8 km from Nishitetsu Fukuoka (Tenjin)
- Platforms: 1 island platform
- Connections

Construction
- Structure type: At-grade

Other information
- Status: Staffed
- Station code: T31
- Website: Official website

History
- Opened: 30 December 1912

Passengers
- FY2022: 905

Services
| Preceding station | Nishitetsu | Following station |
|---|---|---|
| Tsubuku towards Nishitetsu Fukuoka (Tenjin) | Tenjin Ōmuta Line Local | Daizenji towards Ōmuta |
Location
- Location within Fukuoka Prefecture Location within Japan

Yasutake Station (安武駅, Yasutake-eki) is a passenger railway station located in the city of Kurume, Fukuoka, Japan. It is operated by the private transportation company Nishi-Nippon Railroad (NNR), and has station number T31.

== Lines ==
The station is served by the Nishitetsu Tenjin Ōmuta Line and is 42.8 kilometers from the starting point of the line at Nishitetsu Fukuoka (Tenjin) Station.

== Station layout ==
The station consists of a one island platform connected to the station building by a level crossing. The station is staffed.

== Platforms ==
| 1 | ■ Tenjin Ōmuta Line | for Nishitetsu Yanagawa and Ōmuta |
| 2 | ■ Tenjin Ōmuta Line | for Nishitetsu Kurume, Nishitetsu Futsukaichi and Fukuoka |

== History ==
The station opened on 30 December 1912 as a station on the Okawa Railway. In 1937, the Okawa Railway merged with the Kyushu Railway and the line was electrified and incorporated into the Omuta Line. The company merged with the Kyushu Electric Tramway on 19 September 1942. The company changed its name to Nishi-Nippon Railway three days later, on 22 September 1942.

== Passenger statistics ==
In fiscal 2022, the station was used by 905 passengers daily.

== Surrounding area ==
- Japan Element Industry Kurume Factory
- Kurume Koiki Fire Department Nishi Substation
- Tsubuku Elementary School

== See also ==
- List of railway stations in Japan
