= Ajisaka Station =

Railway station in Ogōri, Fukuoka Prefecture, Japan

Ajisaka Station 味坂駅
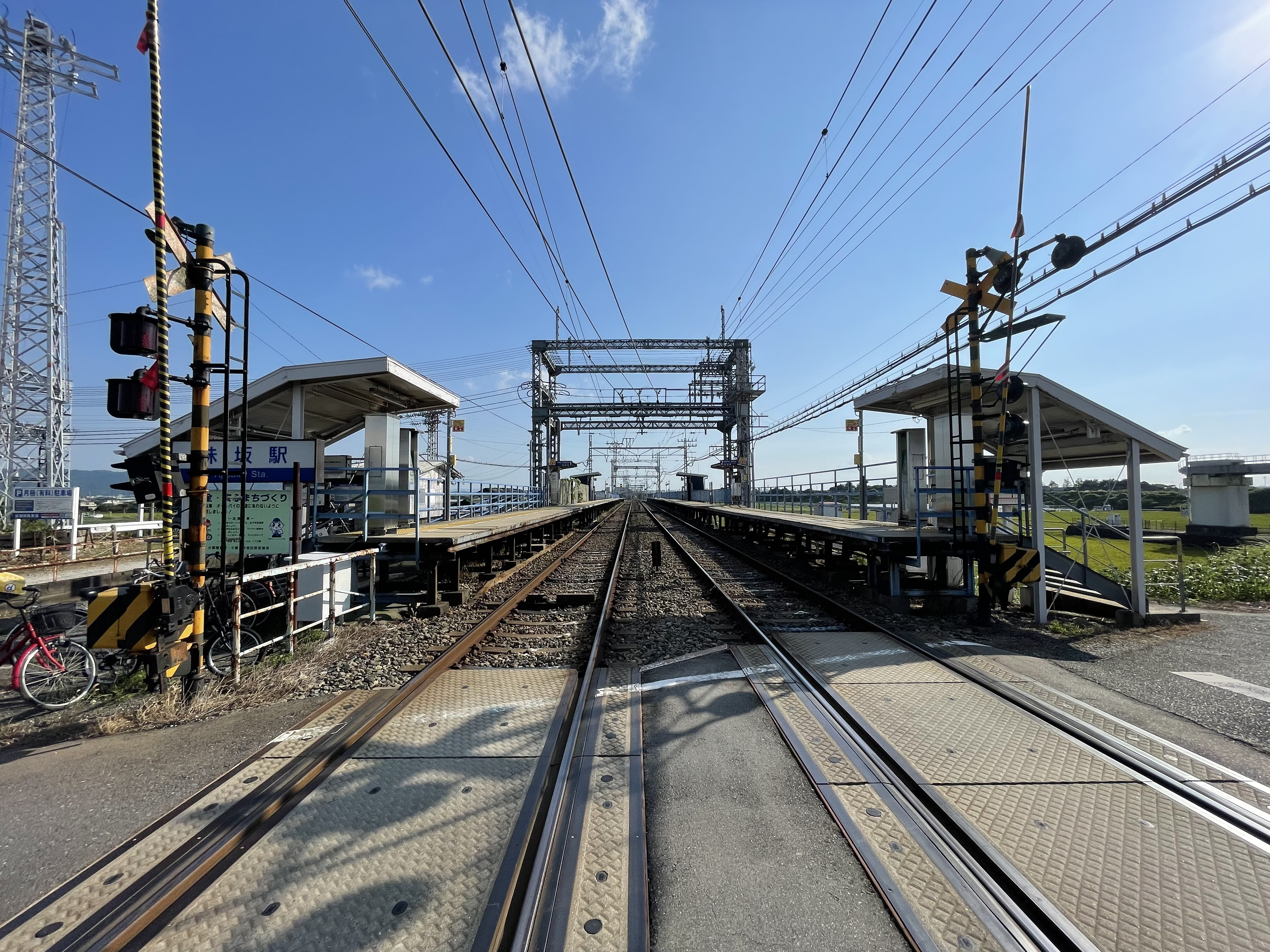
- Full view of Ajisaka Station in September 2022

General information
- Location: Akagawa, Ogōri-shi, Fukuoka-ken 838-0135; Japan
- Coordinates: 33°21′12.6″N 130°32′27.13″E
- Operator: Nishi-Nippon Railroad
- Line: ■ Tenjin Ōmuta Line
- Distance: 33.7 km from Nishitetsu Fukuoka (Tenjin)
- Platforms: 2 side platform
- Connections

Construction
- Structure type: At-grade

Other information
- Status: Staffed
- Station code: T24
- Website: Official website

History
- Opened: 12 April 1924

Passengers
- FY2022: 178

Services
Preceding station	Nishitetsu	Following station
Hatama towards Nishitetsu Fukuoka (Tenjin)	Tenjin Ōmuta Line Local	Miyanojin towards Ōmuta
Location
- Location within Fukuoka Prefecture Location within Japan

Ajisaka Station (味坂駅, Ajisaka-eki) is a passenger railway station located in the city of Ogōri, Fukuoka, Japan. It is operated by the private transportation company Nishi-Nippon Railroad (NNR), and has station number T24.

== Lines ==
The station is served by the Nishitetsu Tenjin Ōmuta Line and is 33.7 kilometers from the starting point of the line at Nishitetsu Fukuoka (Tenjin) Station.

== Station layout ==
The station consists of a two opposed ground-level side platforms connected to the station building by a level crossing. The station is staffed.

== Platforms ==
1	■ Tenjin Ōmuta Line	for Kurume, Yanagawa and Ōmuta
2	■ Tenjin Ōmuta Line	for Futsukaichi and Fukuoka

== History ==
The station opened on 12 April 1924 as a station on the Kyushu Railway. The company merged with the Kyushu Electric Tramway on 19 September 1942. The company changed its name to Nishi-Nippon Railway three days later, on 22 September 1942.

== Passenger statistics ==
In fiscal 2022, the station was used by 178 passengers daily.

== Surrounding area ==
The station is located in the southernmost part of Ogori City. The surrounding area is along the Homan River, and the fields are dotted with private houses and private shops. There are no large-scale commercial facilities.

== See also ==
- List of railway stations in Japan
