= Ōho Station =

Railway station in Ogōri, Fukuoka Prefecture, Japan

Ōho Station 大保駅
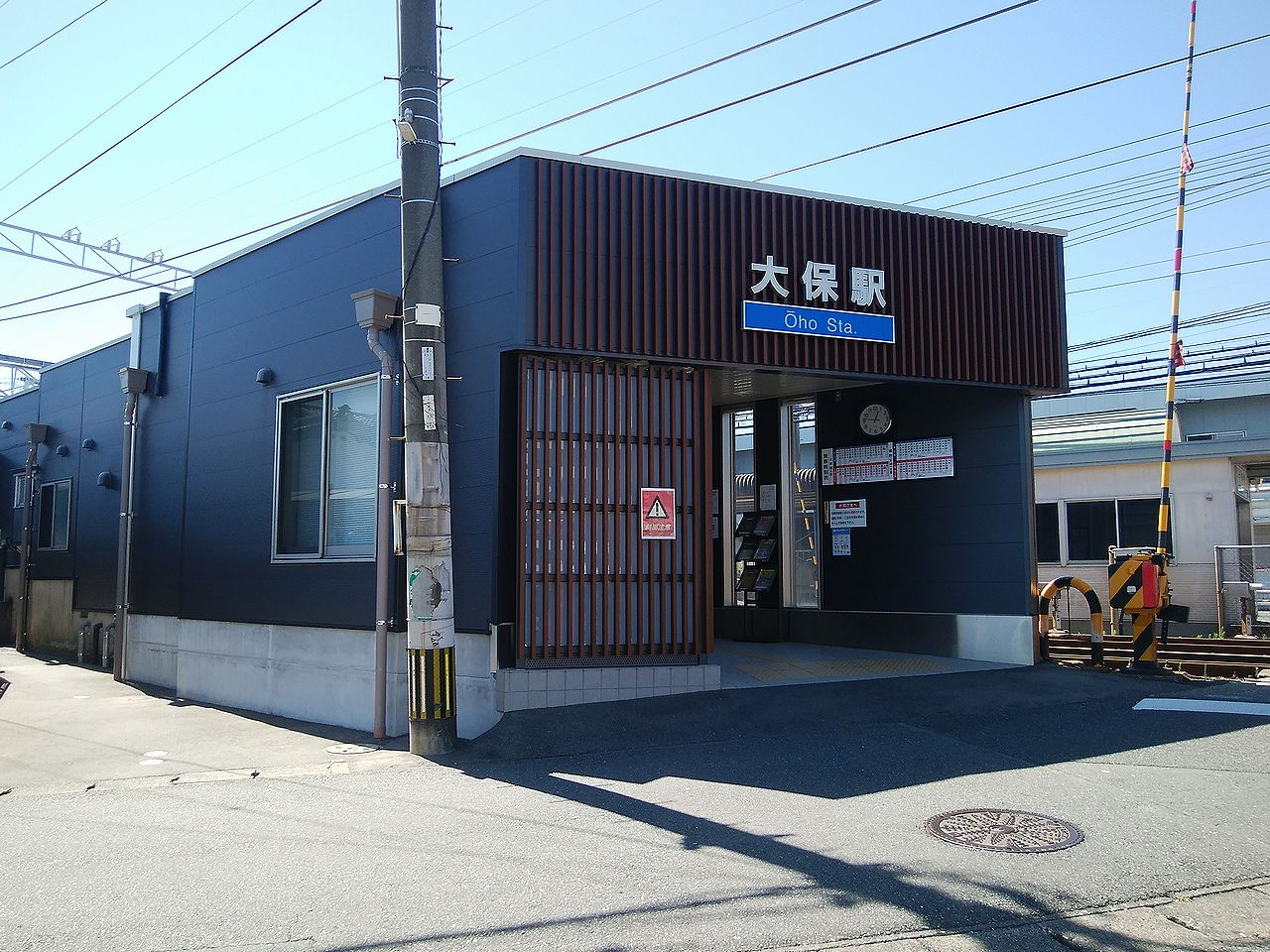
- Oho Station building

General information
- Location: Ōho, Ogōri-shi, Fukuoka-ken 838-0115; Japan
- Coordinates: 33°24′42.62″N 130°33′29.39″E
- Operator: Nishi-Nippon Railroad
- Line: ■ Tenjin Ōmuta Line
- Distance: 27.0 km from Nishitetsu Fukuoka (Tenjin)
- Platforms: 2 side platform
- Connections

Construction
- Structure type: At-grade

Other information
- Station code: T21
- Website: Official website

History
- Opened: 12 April 1924

Passengers
- FY2022: 2392

Services
Preceding station	Nishitetsu	Following station
Mitsusawa towards Nishitetsu Fukuoka (Tenjin)	Tenjin Ōmuta Line Local	Nishitetsu Ogōri towards Ōmuta
Location
- Location within Fukuoka Prefecture Location within Japan

Ōho Station (大保駅, Ōho-eki) is a passenger railway station located in the city of Ogōri, Fukuoka, Japan. It is operated by the private transportation company Nishi-Nippon Railroad (NNR), and has station number T21.

== Lines ==
The station is served by the Nishitetsu Tenjin Ōmuta Line and is 27.0 kilometers from the starting point of the line at Nishitetsu Fukuoka (Tenjin) Station.

== Station layout ==
The station consists of a two opposed ground-level side platforms connected to the station building by a level crossing.

== Platforms ==
{

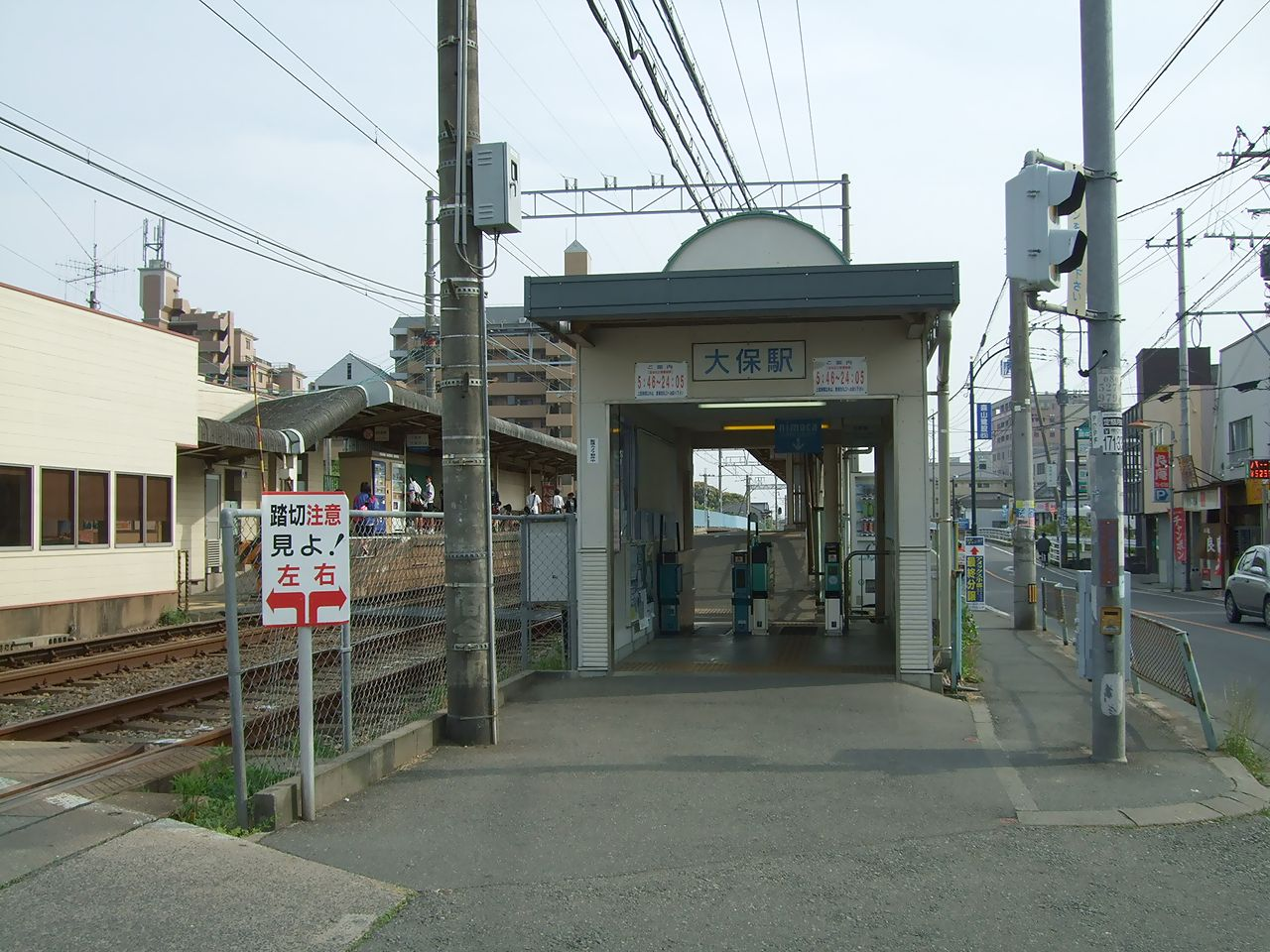
Oho station platform

1	■ Tenjin Ōmuta Line	for Kurume, Yanagawa and Ōmuta
2	■ Tenjin Ōmuta Line	for Futsukaichi and Fukuoka

== History ==
The station opened on 12 April 1924 as a station on the Kyushu Railway. The company merged with the Kyushu Electric Tramway on 19 September 1942. The company changed its name to Nishi-Nippon Railway three days later, on 22 September 1942.

== Passenger statistics ==
In fiscal 2022, the station was used by 2392 passengers daily.

== Surrounding area ==
- Ōhara Elementary School
- JGSDF Ogōri Camp
- Ōhara Junior High School
- Honma Hospital (5 minutes by car)
- Ogōriōho Post Office
- Hiraoka Cookery College
- Kyushu Institute of Information Sciences

== See also ==
- List of railway stations in Japan
