= Higashi-Amagi Station =

Railway station in Ōmuta, Fukuoka Prefecture, Japan

Higashi-Amagi Station 東甘木駅
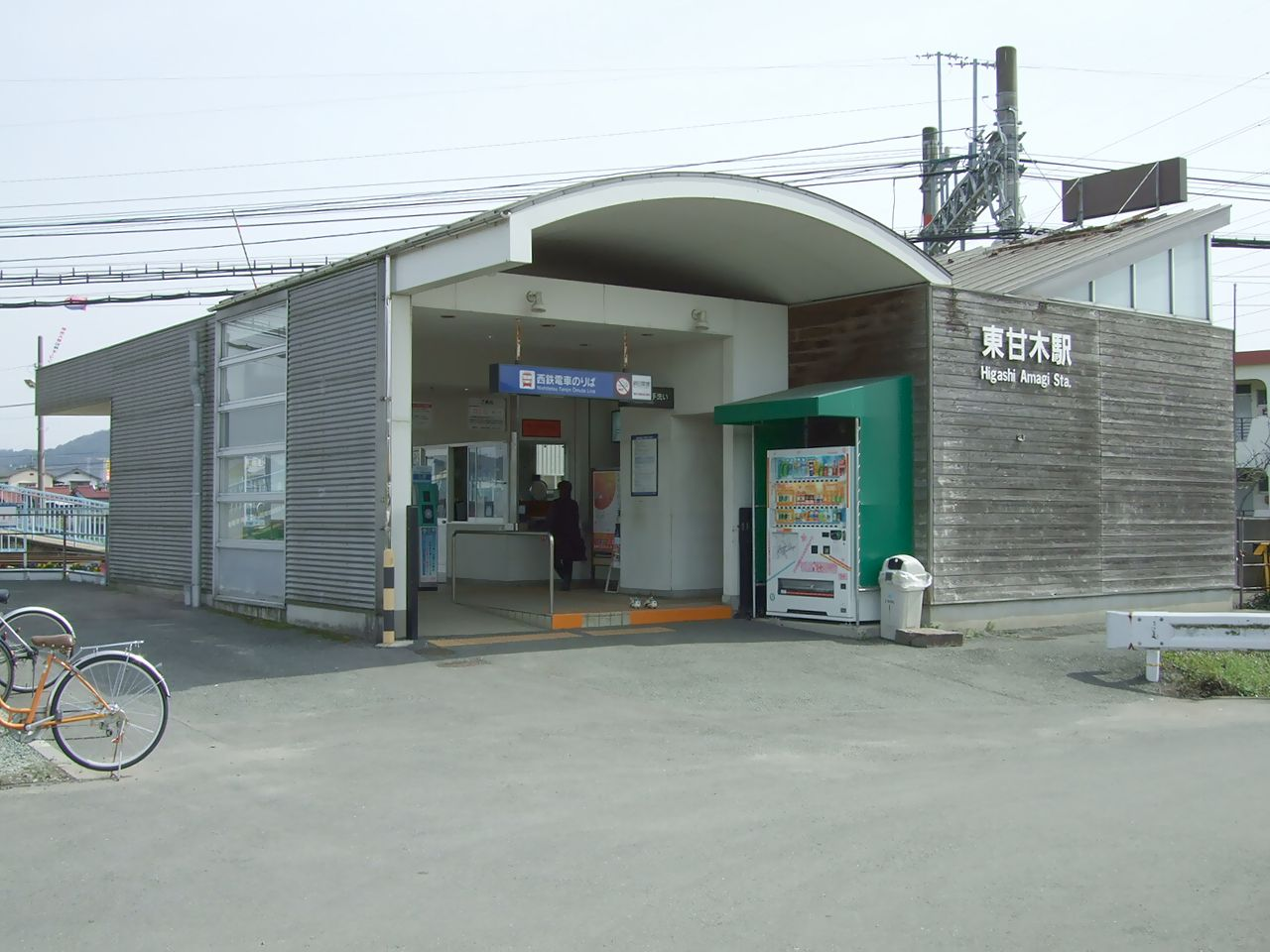
- Higashi-Amagi Station building

General information
- Location: Amagi, Ōmuta-shi, Fukuoka-ken 837-0905; Japan
- Coordinates: 33°3′42.5″N 130°27′49.9″E
- Operator: Nishi-Nippon Railroad
- Line: ■ Tenjin Ōmuta Line
- Distance: 70.8 km from Nishitetsu Fukuoka (Tenjin)
- Platforms: 2 side platforms

Other information
- Status: Unstaffed
- Station code: T47
- Website: Official website

History
- Opened: 1 November 1952

Passengers
- FY2022: 349

Services
Preceding station	Nishitetsu	Following station
Kuranaga towards Nishitetsu Fukuoka (Tenjin)	Tenjin Ōmuta Line Local	Nishitetsu Ginsui towards Ōmuta
Location
- Location within Fukuoka Prefecture Location within Japan

Higashi-Amagi Station (東甘木駅, Higashi-amagi-eki) is a passenger railway station located in the city of Ōmuta, Fukuoka, Japan. It is operated by the private transportation company Nishi-Nippon Railroad (NNR), and has station number T47.

== Lines ==
The station is served by the Nishitetsu Tenjin Ōmuta Line and is 70.8 kilometers from the starting point of the line at Nishitetsu Fukuoka (Tenjin) Station.

== Station layout ==
The station consists of two opposed side platforms connected by a level crossing.

== Platforms ==
1	■ Tenjin Ōmuta Line	for Ōmuta
2	■ Tenjin Ōmuta Line	for Daizenji, Nishitetsu Kurume, Nishitetsu Futsukaichi, Fukuoka and Nishitetsu Yanagawa

== History ==
The station opened on 1 November 1952.

== Passenger statistics ==
In fiscal 2022, the station was used by 349 passengers daily.

== Surrounding area ==
- Amagi Park
- Amagi Junior High School
- Seishū High School
- Ōmutatachibana Post Office
- Shin-Ōmuta Station

== See also ==
- List of railway stations in Japan
