= Kushiwara Station =

Railway station in Kurume, Fukuoka Prefecture, Japan

Kushiwara Station 櫛原駅
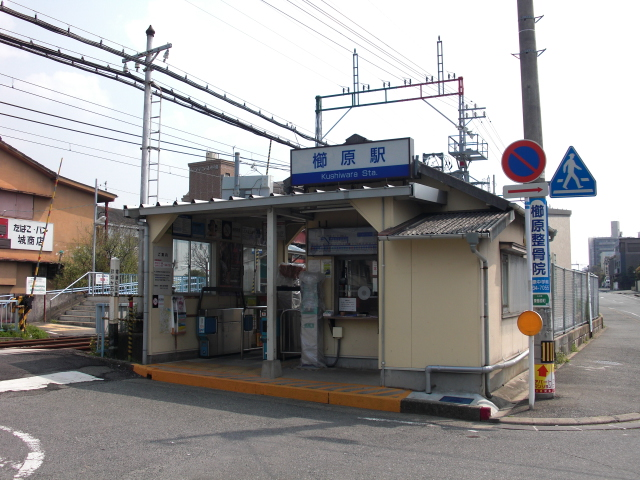
- Kushiwara Station building

General information
- Location: Higashikushiharamachi, Kurume-shi, Fukuoka-ken 830-0003; Japan
- Coordinates: 33°19′11.79″N 130°31′27.61″E
- Operator: Nishi-Nippon Railroad
- Line: ■ Tenjin Ōmuta Line
- Distance: 37.7 km from Nishitetsu Fukuoka (Tenjin)
- Platforms: 2 side platforms
- Connections

Construction
- Structure type: At-grade

Other information
- Status: Staffed
- Station code: T26
- Website: Official website

History
- Opened: 12 April 1924

Passengers
- FY2022: 968

Services
Preceding station	Nishitetsu	Following station
Miyanojin towards Nishitetsu Fukuoka (Tenjin)	Tenjin Ōmuta Line Local	Nishitetsu Kurume towards Ōmuta
Location
- Location within Fukuoka Prefecture Location within Japan

Kushiwara Station (櫛原駅, Kushiwara-eki) is a passenger railway station located in the city of Kurume, Fukuoka, Japan. It is operated by the private transportation company Nishi-Nippon Railroad (NNR), and has station number T26.

== Lines ==
The station is served by the Nishitetsu Tenjin Ōmuta Line and is 37.7 kilometers from the starting point of the line at Nishitetsu Fukuoka (Tenjin) Station.

== Station layout ==
The station consists of two opposed ground-level side platforms connected to the station building by a level crossing. The station is staffed.

== Platforms ==
1	■ Tenjin Ōmuta Line	for Nishitetsu Kurume, Nishitetsu Yanagawa and Ōmuta
2	■ Tenjin Ōmuta Line	for Nishitetsu Futsukaichi and Fukuoka

== History ==
The station opened on 12 April 1924 as a station on the Kyushu Railway. The company merged with the Kyushu Electric Tramway on 19 September 1942. The company changed its name to Nishi-Nippon Railway three days later, on 22 September 1942.

== Passenger statistics ==
In fiscal 2022, the station was used by 968 passengers daily.

== Surrounding area ==
- Kurume Central Park
- Fukuoka Science Museum
- Kurume Bird Center
- Nankun Elementary School
- Kurume University
- Kurume Castle Ruins
- Kurume City Hall
- Kurumedaiichi Hospital
- Kusu Hospital
- Kurume Higashikushihara Post Office

== See also ==
- List of railway stations in Japan
