= Nishitetsu Ginsui Station =

Railway station in Ōmuta, Fukuoka Prefecture, Japan

Nishitetsu Ginsui Station 西鉄銀水駅
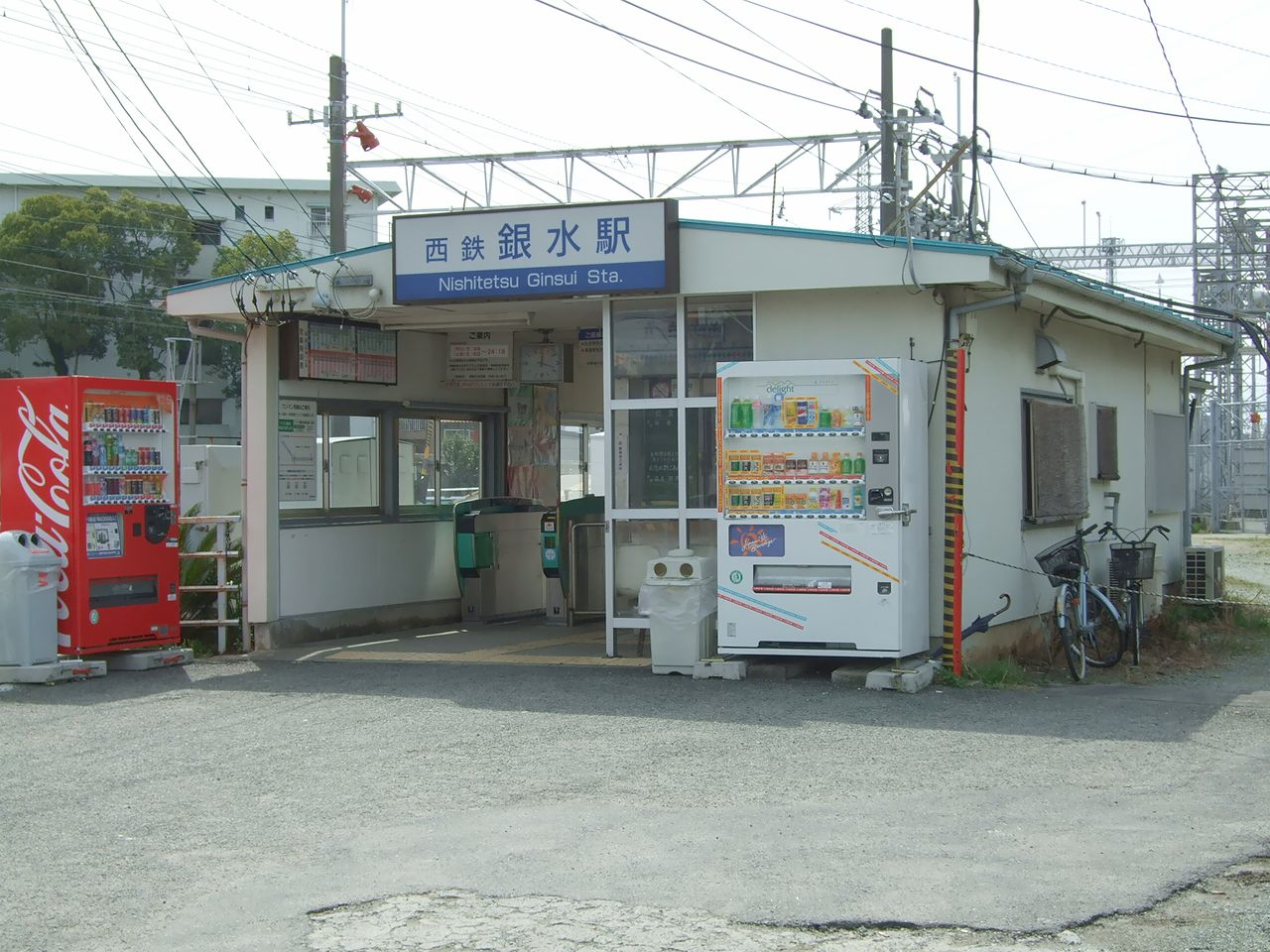
- Ginsui Station building

General information
- Location: Kusagi, Ōmuta-shi, Fukuoka-ken 837-0917; Japan
- Coordinates: 33°3′6.2″N 130°27′30.5″E
- Operator: Nishi-Nippon Railroad
- Line: ■ Tenjin Ōmuta Line
- Distance: 72.1 km from Nishitetsu Fukuoka (Tenjin)
- Platforms: 1 island platform
- Connections

Other information
- Station code: T48
- Website: Official website

History
- Opened: 1 October 1938
- Former names: Ginsui (to 1939); Kyutetsu Ginsui (to 1942)

Passengers
- FY2022: 518

Services
Preceding station	Nishitetsu	Following station
Higashi-Amagi towards Nishitetsu Fukuoka (Tenjin)	Tenjin Ōmuta Line Local	Shin-Sakaemachi towards Ōmuta
Location
- Location within Fukuoka Prefecture Location within Japan

Nishitetsu Ginsui Station (西鉄銀水駅, Nishitetsu-ginsui-eki) is a passenger railway station located in the city of Ōmuta, Fukuoka, Japan. It is operated by the private transportation company Nishi-Nippon Railroad (NNR), and has station number T48.

== Lines ==
The station is served by the Nishitetsu Tenjin Ōmuta Line and is 72.1 kilometers from the starting point of the line at Nishitetsu Fukuoka (Tenjin) Station.

== Station layout ==
The station consists of one elevated island platform connected by a level crossing.

== Platforms ==
1	■ Tenjin Ōmuta Line	for Ōmuta
2	■ Tenjin Ōmuta Line	for Daizenji, Nishitetsu Kurume, Nishitetsu Futsukaichi, Fukuoka and Nishitetsu Yanagawa

== History ==
The station opened on 1 October 1938 as Ginsui Station (銀水駅). The station name was changed to Kyutetsu Ginsui Station (九鉄銀水駅) on 1 July 1939. The company merged with the Kyushu Electric Tramway on 19 September 1942. The company changed its name to Nishi-Nippon Railway three days later, on 22 September 1942 and the station was renamed Nishitetsu Ginsui Station (西鉄銀水駅) .

== Passenger statistics ==
In fiscal 2022, the station was used by 518 passengers daily.

== Surrounding area ==
- Ginsui Station
- Hayamadai Elementary School
- Miike Junior High School
- Hakkō Junior High School
- Omuta Junior and High School
- Ginsui Post Office
- Tegama Kitamachi Park
- Shirakawa Hospital
- Japan National Route 208

== See also ==
- List of railway stations in Japan
