= Murasaki Station =

Railway station in Chikushino, Fukuoka Prefecture, Japan

Murasaki Station 紫駅
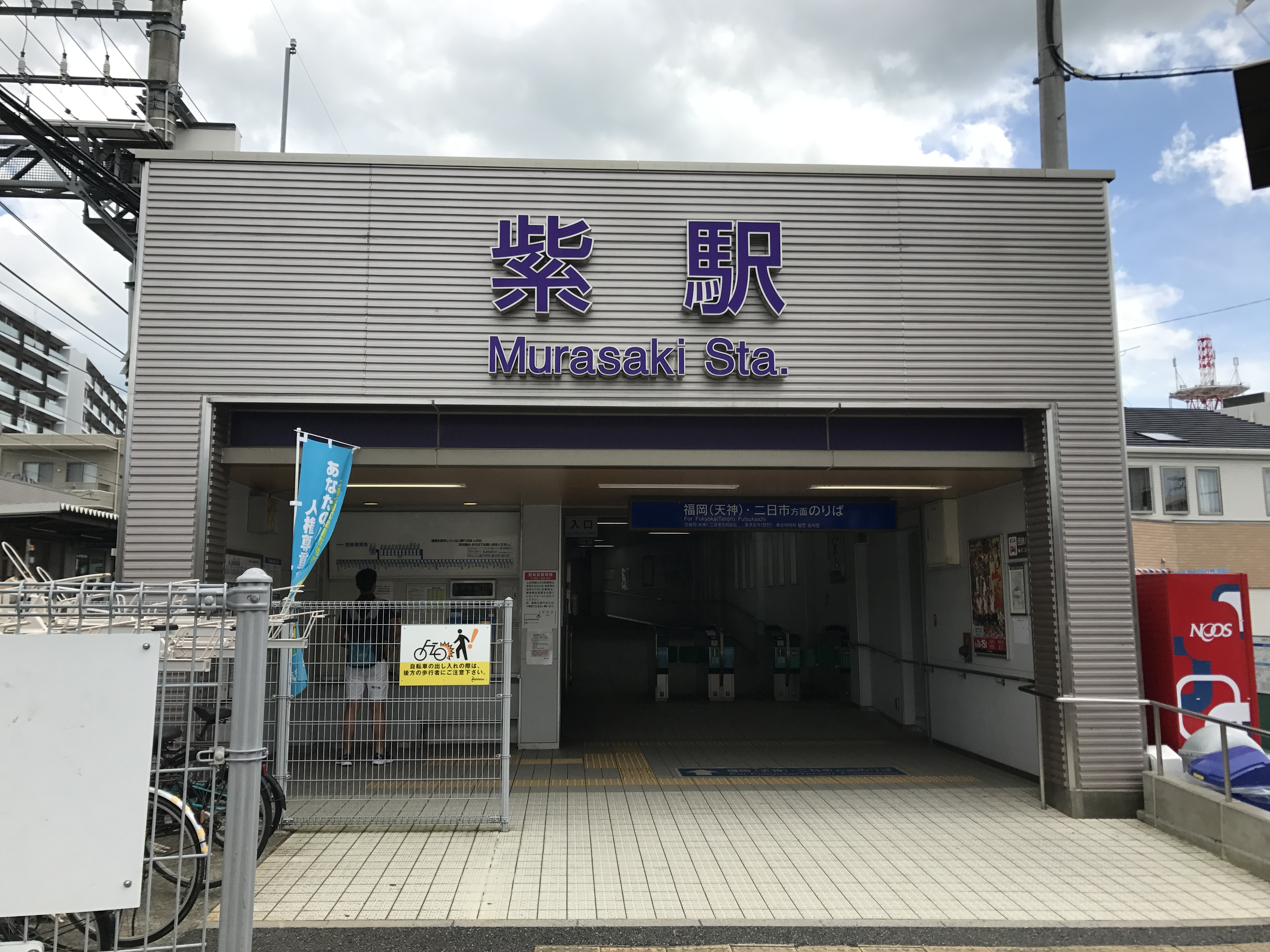
- The station in July 2017

General information
- Location: 449-11-2 Murasaki, Chikushino-shi, Fukuoka-ken; Japan
- Coordinates: 33°29′47″N 130°31′19″E
- Operator: Nishi-Nippon Railroad
- Line: ■ Tenjin Ōmuta Line
- Distance: 16.1 km from Nishitetsu Fukuoka (Tenjin)
- Platforms: 2 side platforms
- Connections: Bus stop

Other information
- Station code: T14
- Website: Official website

History
- Opened: 27 March 2010

Passengers
- FY2022: 6072

Services
Preceding station	Nishitetsu	Following station
Nishitetsu Futsukaichi towards Nishitetsu Fukuoka (Tenjin)	Tenjin Ōmuta Line Local	Asakuragaidō towards Ōmuta
Location
- Location within Fukuoka Prefecture Location within Japan

Murasaki Station (紫駅, Murasaki-eki) is a passenger railway station located in the city of Chikushino, Fukuoka, Japan. It is operated by the private transportation company Nishi-Nippon Railroad (NNR), and has station number T14.

== Lines ==
The station is served by the Nishitetsu Tenjin Ōmuta Line and is 16.1 kilometers from the starting point of the line at Nishitetsu Fukuoka (Tenjin) Station.

== Station layout ==
The station consists of a two opposed ground level side platforms. There is no connection between platforms, and passengers wishing to change platforms must leave the station and re-enter after crossing a level crossing outside the station. The station is staffed.

== Platforms ==
1	■ Tenjin Ōmuta Line	for Kurume, Yanagawa and Ōmuta
2	■ Tenjin Ōmuta Line	for Futsukaichi,Fukuoka

== History ==
The station opened on 27 March 2010. Construction cost approximately 700 million yen.

== Passenger statistics ==
In fiscal 2022, the station was used by 6072 passengers daily.

== Surrounding area ==
- Chikushino City Futsukaichi Junior High School

== See also ==
- List of railway stations in Japan
