= Tokumasu Station =

Railway station in Yanagawa, Fukuoka Prefecture, Japan

Tokumasu Station 徳益駅
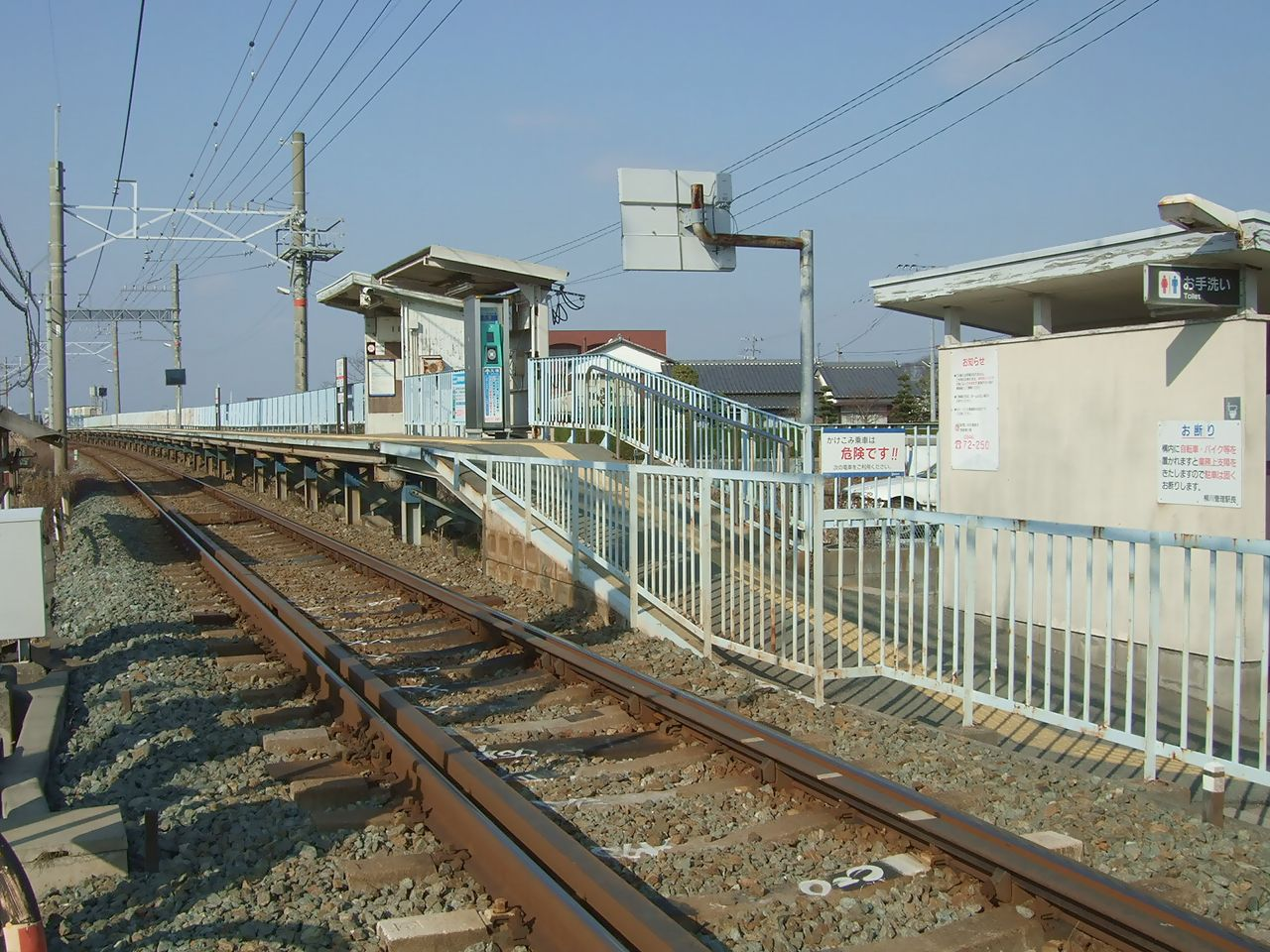
- Tokumasu Station platform

General information
- Location: Yamatomachi Tokumasu, Yanagawa-shi, Fukuoka-ken 839-0241; Japan
- Coordinates: 33°9′18.34″N 130°25′36.74″E
- Operator: Nishi-Nippon Railroad
- Line: ■ Tenjin Ōmuta Line
- Distance: 59.7 km from Nishitetsu Fukuoka (Tenjin)
- Platforms: 1 side platform
- Connections

Other information
- Status: Unstaffed
- Station code: T40
- Website: Official website

History
- Opened: 1 September 1938

Passengers
- FY2022: 171

Services
Preceding station	Nishitetsu	Following station
Nishitetsu Yanagawa towards Nishitetsu Fukuoka (Tenjin)	Tenjin Ōmuta Line Local	Shiotsuka towards Ōmuta
Location
- Location within Fukuoka Prefecture Location within Japan

Tokumasu Station (徳益駅, Tokumasu-eki) is a passenger railway station located in the city of Yanagawa, Fukuoka, Japan. It is operated by the private transportation company Nishi-Nippon Railroad (NNR), and has station number T40.

== Lines ==
The station is served by the Nishitetsu Tenjin Ōmuta Line and is 59.7 kilometers from the starting point of the line at Nishitetsu Fukuoka (Tenjin) Station.

== Station layout ==
The station consists of one side platform serving a single bi-directional track. There is no station building, but only a shelter on the platform. The station is unattended.

== Platforms ==
1	■ Tenjin Ōmuta Line	for Nishitetsu Yanagawa, Ōmuta and for Daizenji, Nishitetsu Kurume, Nishitetsu Futsukaichi, Fukuoka

== History ==
The station opened on 1 September 1938. The company merged with the Kyushu Electric Tramway on 19 September 1942. The company changed its name to Nishi-Nippon Railway three days later, on 22 September 1942.

== Passenger statistics ==
In fiscal 2022, the station was used by 171 passengers daily.

== Surrounding area ==
- Yanagawa Driving School
- Yanagawa Police Station
- Tamatare Shrine
- Japan National Route 208
- Prefectural Route 772

== See also ==
- List of railway stations in Japan
