= Kuranaga Station =

Railway station in Ōmuta, Fukuoka Prefecture, Japan

Kuranaga Station 倉永駅
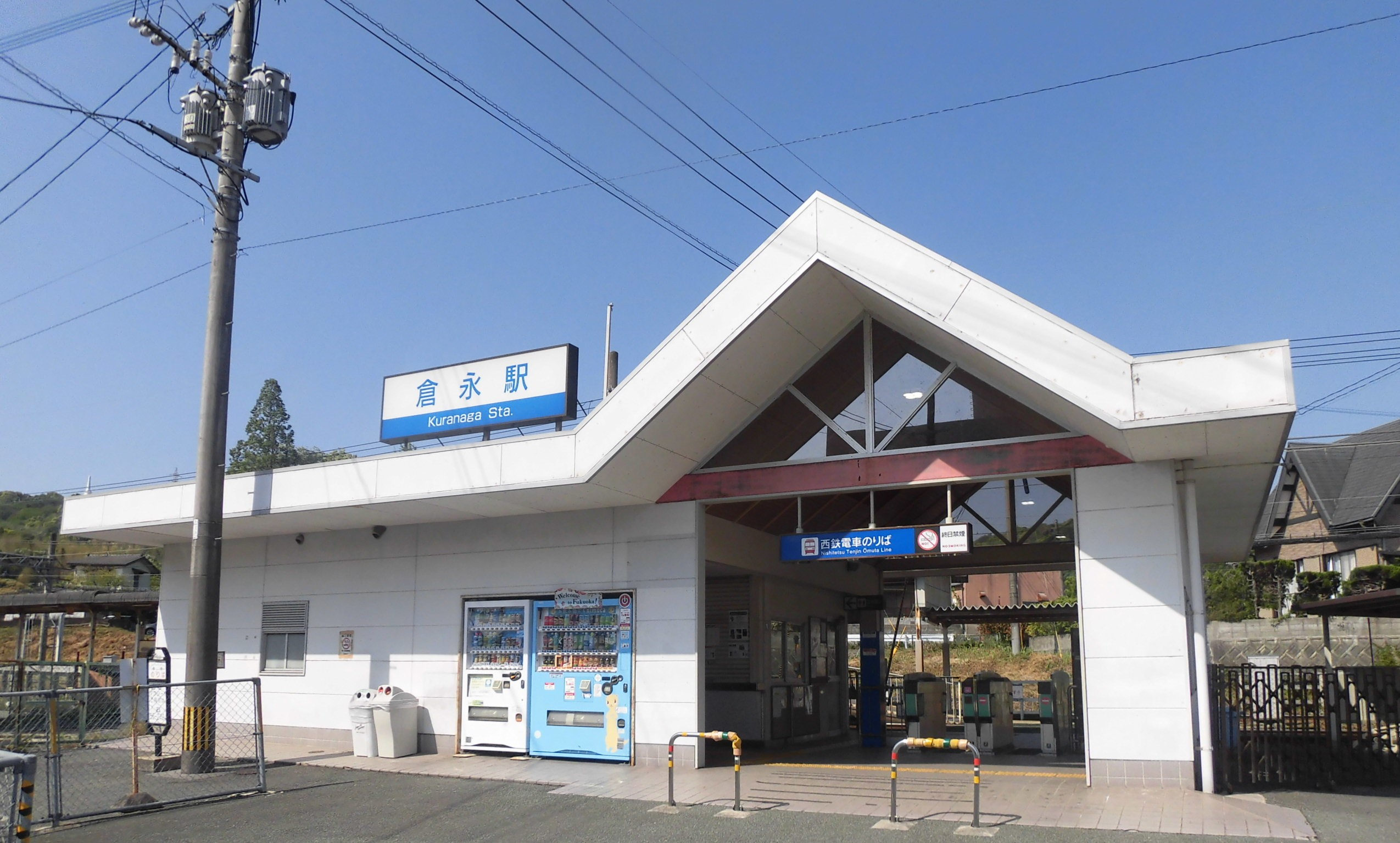
- Kuranaga Station building in 2021

General information
- Location: Kuranaga, Ōmuta-shi, Fukuoka-ken 837-0906; Japan
- Coordinates: 33°4′20.97″N 130°27′49.81″E
- Operator: Nishi-Nippon Railroad
- Line: ■ Tenjin Ōmuta Line
- Distance: 69.6 km from Nishitetsu Fukuoka (Tenjin)
- Platforms: 1 island platform

Other information
- Status: Unstaffed
- Station code: T46
- Website: Official website

History
- Opened: 1 October 1938

Passengers
- FY2022: 842

Services
Preceding station	Nishitetsu	Following station
Nishitetsu Wataze towards Nishitetsu Fukuoka (Tenjin)	Tenjin Ōmuta Line Local	Higashi-Amagi towards Ōmuta
Location
- Location within Fukuoka Prefecture Location within Japan

Kuranaga Station (倉永駅, Kuranaga-eki) is a passenger railway station located in the city of Ōmuta, Fukuoka, Japan. It is operated by the private transportation company Nishi-Nippon Railroad (NNR), and has station number T46.

== Lines ==
The station is served by the Nishitetsu Tenjin Ōmuta Line and is 69.6 kilometers from the starting point of the line at Nishitetsu Fukuoka (Tenjin) Station.

== Station layout ==
The station consists of one island platform connected by a level crossing.

== Platforms ==
1	■ Tenjin Ōmuta Line	for Ōmuta
2	■ Tenjin Ōmuta Line	for Daizenji, Nishitetsu Kurume, Nishitetsu Futsukaichi, Fukuoka and Nishitetsu Yanagawa

== History ==
The station opened on 1 October 1938.

== Passenger statistics ==
In fiscal 2022, the station was used by 842 passengers daily.

== Surrounding area ==
- Mount Amagiyama
- Meiko Gakuen Elementary and Junior High School
- Ariakeshinsei High School
- Omuta Kita High School
- Yoshinotenshi Kindergarten
- Yoshino Station
- Kuranaga Post Office
- Kuragana Police box

== See also ==
- List of railway stations in Japan
