= Yakabe Station =

Railway station in Yanagawa, Fukuoka Prefecture, Japan

Yakabe Station 矢加部駅
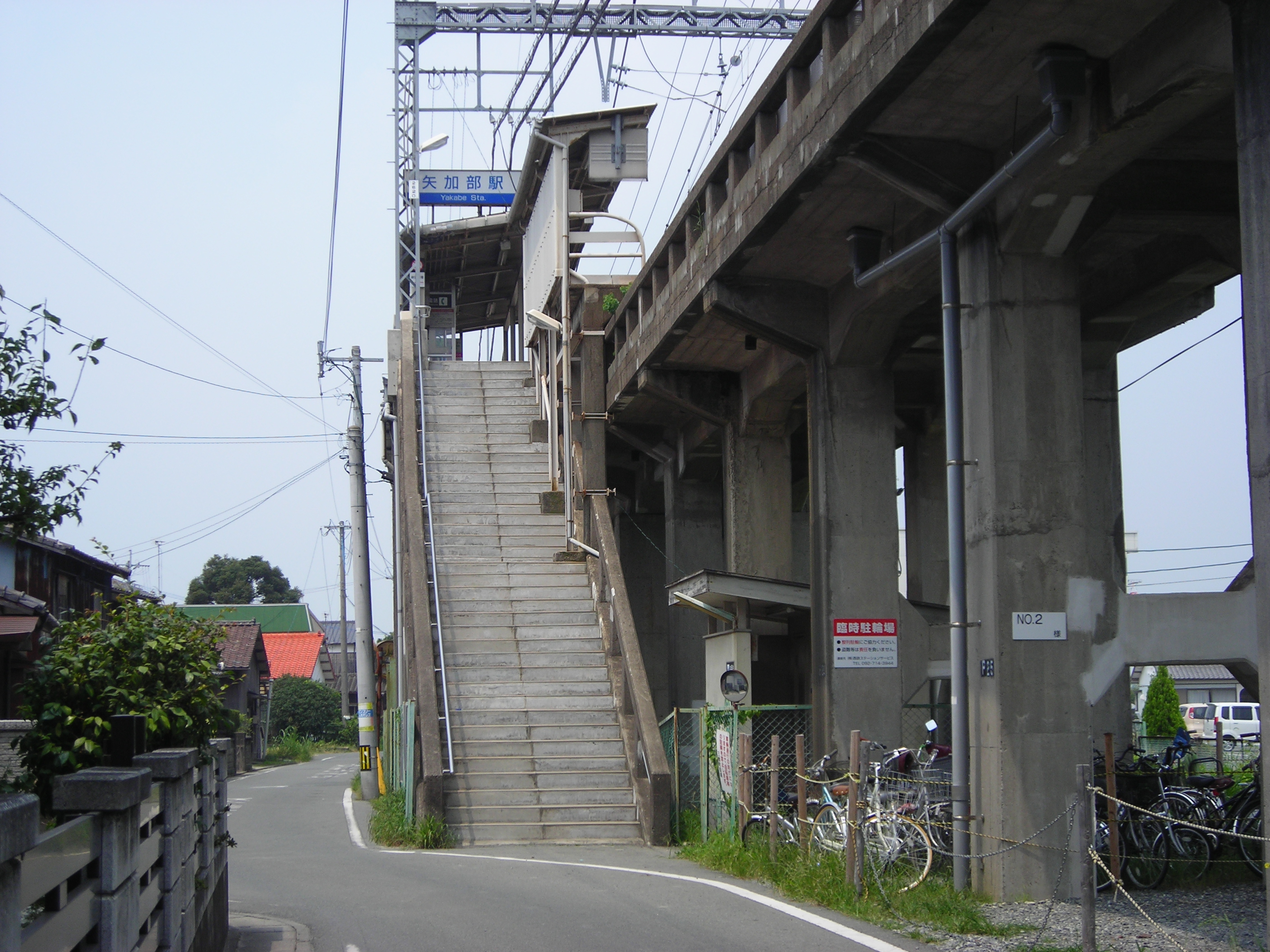
- Yakabe Station (2007)

General information
- Location: Mitsuhashimachi Yanagawa, Yanagawa-shi, Fukuoka-ken 832-0806; Japan
- Coordinates: 33°10′26.53″N 130°24′56.43″E
- Operator: Nishi-Nippon Railroad
- Line: ■ Tenjin Ōmuta Line
- Distance: 57.3 km from Nishitetsu Fukuoka (Tenjin)
- Platforms: 1 side platform
- Connections

Other information
- Status: Unstaffed
- Station code: T38
- Website: Official website

History
- Opened: 1 October 1937

Passengers
- FY2022: 180

Services
Preceding station	Nishitetsu	Following station
Kamachi towards Nishitetsu Fukuoka (Tenjin)	Tenjin Ōmuta Line Local	Nishitetsu Yanagawa towards Ōmuta
Location
- Location within Fukuoka Prefecture Location within Japan

Yakabe Station (矢加部駅, Yakabe-eki) is a passenger railway station located in the city of Yanagawa, Fukuoka, Japan. It is operated by the private transportation company Nishi-Nippon Railroad (NNR), and has station number T38.

== Lines ==
The station is served by the Nishitetsu Tenjin Ōmuta Line and is 57.3 kilometers from the starting point of the line at Nishitetsu Fukuoka (Tenjin) Station.

== Station layout ==
The station consists of one elevated side platform with the station facilities underneath. There is no station building, and the station is unattended.

== Platforms ==
1	■ Tenjin Ōmuta Line	for Daizenji, Nishitetsu Kurume, Nishitetsu Futsukaichi, Fukuoka, and Nishitetsu Yanagawa, Ōmuta

== History ==
The station opened on 1 October 1937. The company merged with the Kyushu Electric Tramway on 19 September 1942. The company changed its name to Nishi-Nippon Railway three days later, on 22 September 1942.

== Passenger statistics ==
In fiscal 2022, the station was used by 180 passengers daily.

== Surrounding area ==
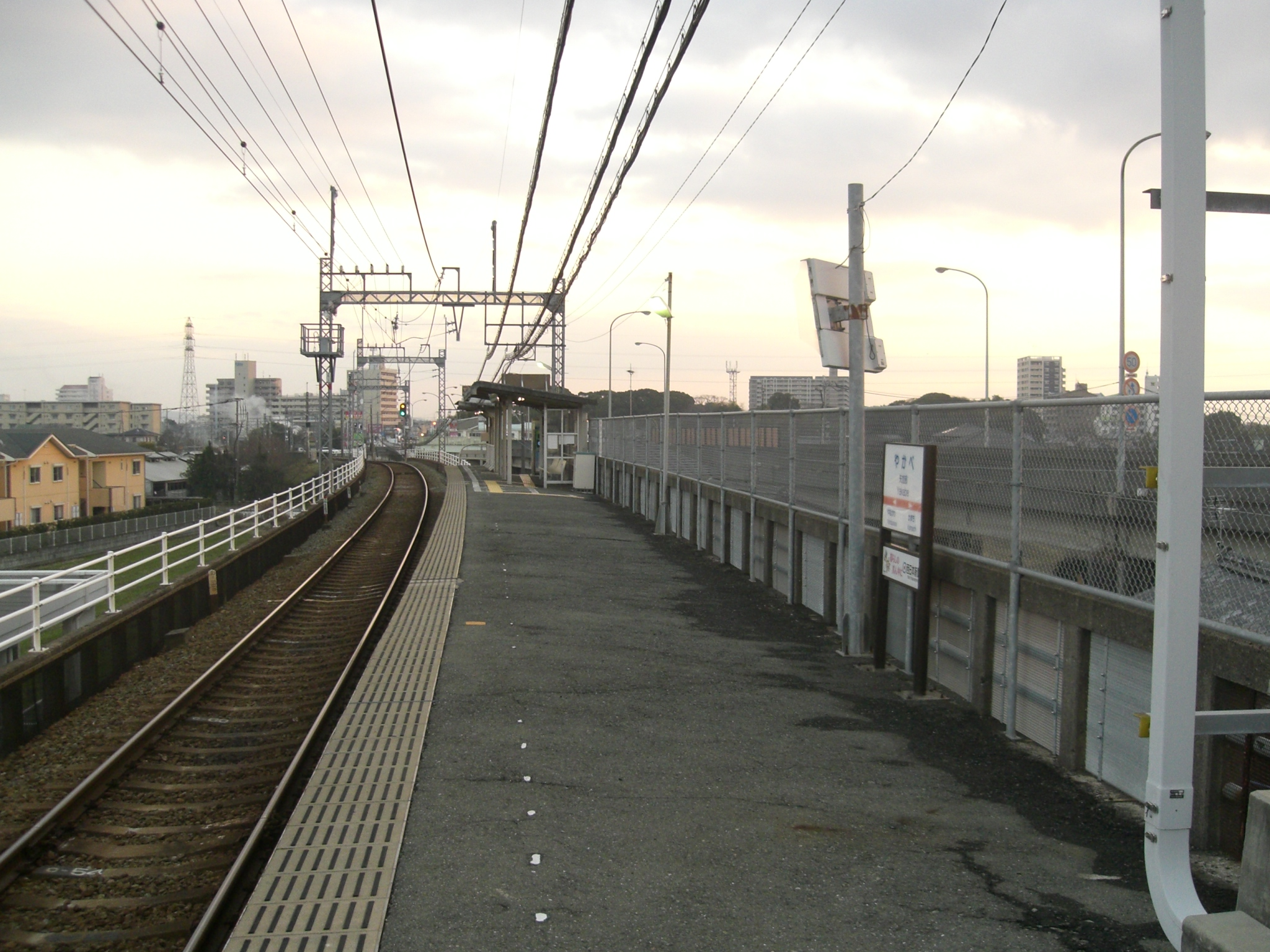
Yakabe Station platform

- Yakabe Elementary School
- Miyajitake Shrine
- Yanagawagokoku Shrine
- Japan National Route 208

== See also ==
- List of railway stations in Japan
