= Takamiya Station (Fukuoka) =

Railway station in Fukuoka, Japan

Takamiya Station 高宮駅
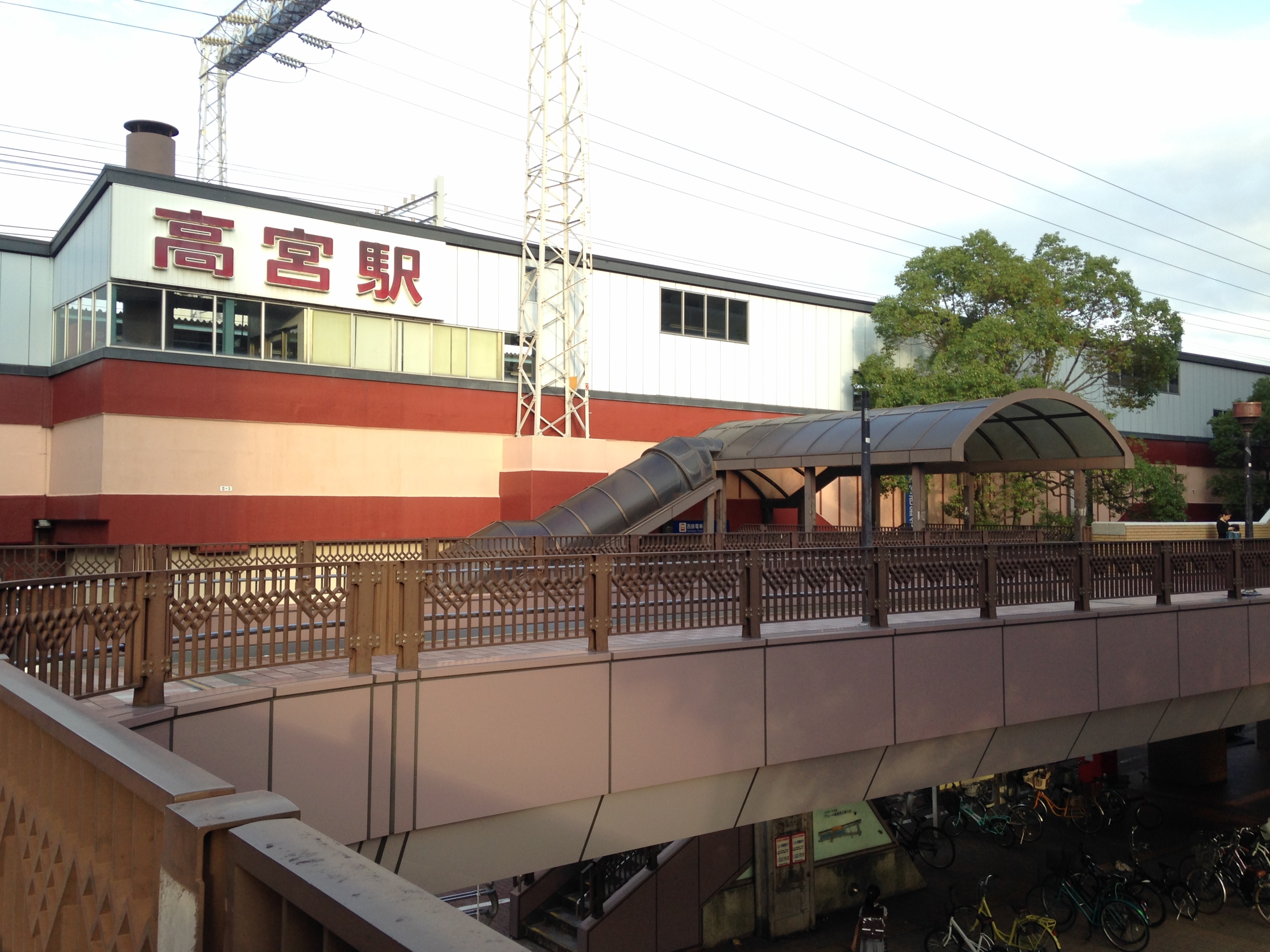
- Takamiya Station (Fukuoka)

General information
- Location: 20-18, 3-chōme Ōgusu, Minami-ku, Fukuoka-shi, Fukuoka-ken; Japan
- Coordinates: 33°34′01″N 130°24′54″E
- Operator: Nishi-Nippon Railroad
- Line: ■ Tenjin Ōmuta Line
- Distance: 2.9 km from Nishitetsu Fukuoka (Tenjin) Station.
- Platforms: 2 side platforms
- Connections: Bus terminal

Construction
- Structure type: Elevated
- Accessible: Yes

Other information
- Station code: T04
- Website: Official website

History
- Opened: 12 April 1924

Passengers
- FY2022: 18,514

Services
Preceding station	Nishitetsu	Following station
Nishitetsu Hirao towards Nishitetsu Fukuoka (Tenjin)	Tenjin Ōmuta Line Local	Ōhashi towards Ōmuta
Location
- Location within Fukuoka Prefecture Location within Japan

Takamiya Station (高宮駅, Takamiya-eki) is a passenger railway station located in Minami-ku, Fukuoka Fukuoka Prefecture, Japan. It is operated by the private transportation company Nishi-Nippon Railroad (NNR), and has station number T04.

== Lines ==
The station is served by the Nishitetsu Tenjin Ōmuta Line and is 2.9 kilometers from the starting point of the line at Nishitetsu Fukuoka (Tenjin) Station.

== Station layout ==
The station consists of two elevated opposed side platforms with the station building underneath.

== Platforms ==
1	■ Tenjin Ōmuta Line	for Futsukaichi, Kurume and Ōmuta
2	■ Tenjin Ōmuta Line	for Fukuoka

== History ==
The station was opened on 12 April 1924.

== Passenger statistics ==
In fiscal 2022, the station was used by 18,514 passengers daily.

== Surrounding area ==
Located in the northern part of Minami Ward, there are many residences and shops around the station.Fukuoka Prefectural Route 31 (commonly known as Takamiya Street) runs parallel to the Omuta Line in front of the station.

- Daiichi Pharmaceutical University - approximately 500m to the southeast
- Fukuoka Daiichi High School - approximately 300m to the southeas

== See also ==
- List of railway stations in Japan
