= Nishitetsu Hirao Station =

Railway station in Fukuoka, Japan

Nishitetsu Hirao Station 西鉄平尾駅
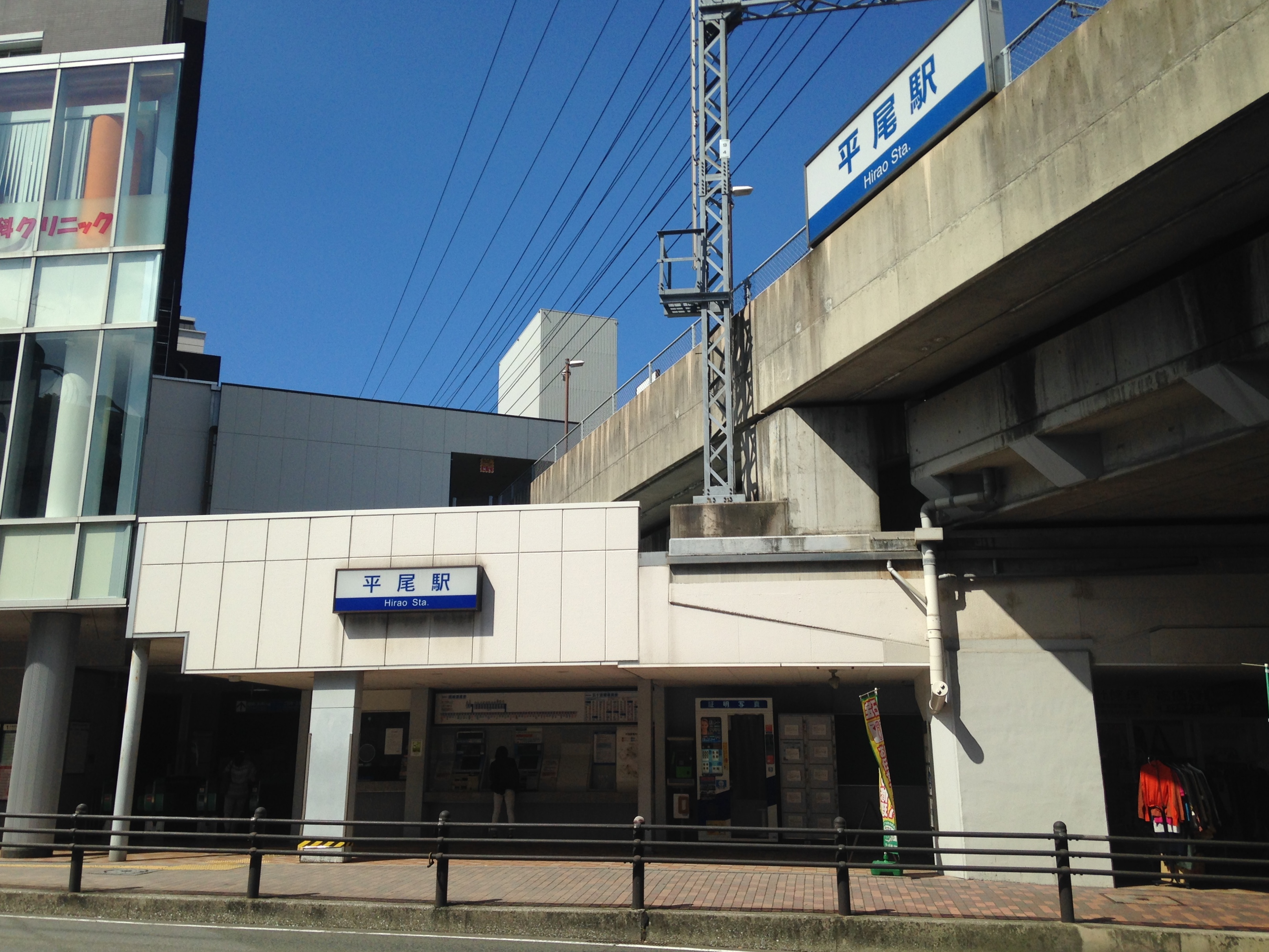
- Nishitetsu Hirao Station

General information
- Location: 5-8, Hirao 2-chōme, Chūō-ku, Fukuoka-shi, Fukuoka-ken; Japan
- Coordinates: 33°34′25″N 130°24′23″E
- Operator: Nishi-Nippon Railroad
- Line: ■ Tenjin Ōmuta Line
- Distance: 1.8 km from Nishitetsu Fukuoka (Tenjin) Station.
- Platforms: 2 side platforms
- Connections: Bus terminal

Construction
- Structure type: Elevated
- Accessible: Yes

Other information
- Station code: T03
- Website: Official website

History
- Opened: 12 April 1924
- Former names: Yahata (to 1939); Kyutetsu Hirao (to 1942)

Passengers
- FY2022: 12,541

Services
Preceding station	Nishitetsu	Following station
Yakuin towards Nishitetsu Fukuoka (Tenjin)	Tenjin Ōmuta Line Local	Takamiya towards Ōmuta
Location
- Location within Fukuoka Prefecture Location within Japan

Nishitetsu Hirao Station (西鉄平尾駅, Nishitetsu Hirao eki) is a passenger railway station located in Chūō-ku, Fukuoka Fukuoka Prefecture, Japan. It is operated by the private transportation company Nishi-Nippon Railroad (NNR), and has station number T03.

== Lines ==
The station is served by the Nishitetsu Tenjin Ōmuta Line and is 1.8 kilometers from the starting point of the line at Nishitetsu Fukuoka (Tenjin) Station.

== Station layout ==
The station consists of two elevated opposed side platforms with the station building underneath.

== Platforms ==
1	■ Tenjin Ōmuta Line	for Futsukaichi, Kurume and Ōmuta
2	■ Tenjin Ōmuta Line	for Fukuoka

== History ==
The station was opened on 12 April 1924 as Yahata Station (八幡駅). Its name was changed to Kyutetsu Hirao Station on 1 July 1939, and to Nishitetsu Hirao Station on 22 September 1942.

== Passenger statistics ==
In fiscal 2022, the station was used by 12,541 passengers daily.

== Surrounding area ==
The station is located at the southern end of Chuo Ward, and across the road in front of the station is Minami Ward. Although there are small shops scattered around the station, it has a strong residential feel. Although there are many condominiums, there are no large-scale schools or commercial or tourist facilities, so despite being close to the center of the city, users are mainly local residents near the station.

== See also ==
- List of railway stations in Japan
