= Kuranaga =

Kuranaga may refer to:

- Kuranaga Station, a train station located in Ōmuta, Fukuoka, Japan
- Misa Kuranaga (born 1982/1983), Japanese ballerina
