= Shin-Sakaemachi Station =

Shin-Sakaemachi Station (新栄町駅) is the name of two train stations in Japan:

- Shinsakae-machi Station (Nagoya)
- Shin-Sakaemachi Station (Fukuoka)
