= Nishitetsu Tenjin Ōmuta Line =

Commuter railway line in Japan

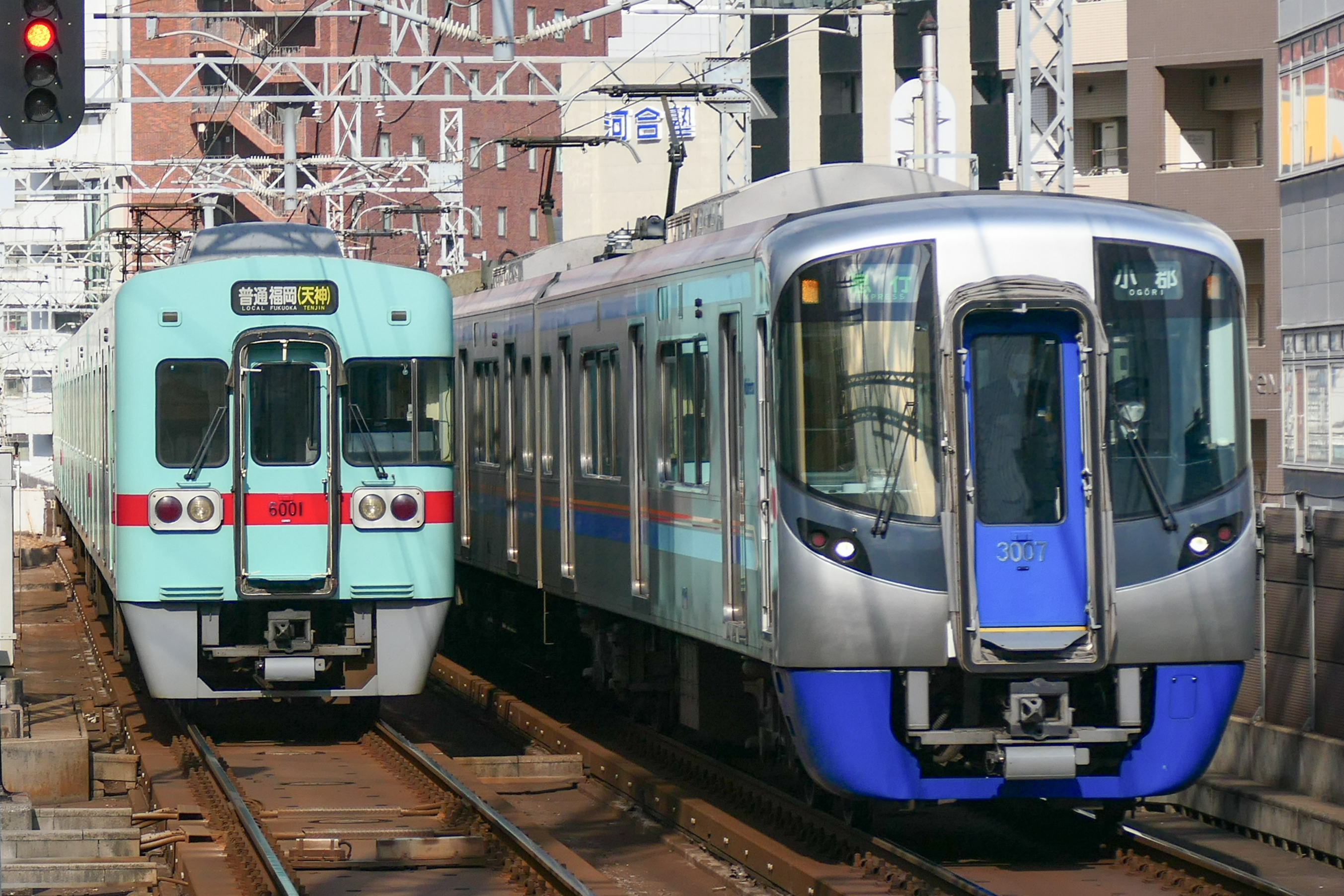
- Tenjin Ōmuta Line trains in December 2022

Overview
- Owner: Nishi-Nippon Railroad
- Locale: Fukuoka Prefecture
- Termini: Nishitetsu Fukuoka (Tenjin); Ōmuta
- Stations: 50

Service
- Type: Heavy rail

History
- Opened: 12 April 1924; 102 years ago

Technical
- Line length: 74.8 km (46.5 mi)
- Track gauge: 1,435 mm (4 ft 8 1/2 in)
- Electrification: 1,500 V (DC)

The Nishitetsu Tenjin Ōmuta Line (西鉄天神大牟田線, Nishitetsu Tenjin Ōmuta sen) is a railway line in Fukuoka Prefecture in Kyushu, Japan. It is the main line of the private railway company Nishi-Nippon Railroad (Nishitetsu). The line connects Nishitetsu Fukuoka (Tenjin) Station (Note: Until 31 December 2000, Nishitetsu Fukuoka was the official name. In order to clarify that the station is in Tenjin district of downtown Fukuoka, the official name now carries the location in parentheses.) in Chūō-ku, Fukuoka with Ōmuta Station in Ōmuta. Until 2000, the line was called the Nishitetsu Ōmuta Line (西鉄大牟田線, Ōmuta sen).

== Overview ==
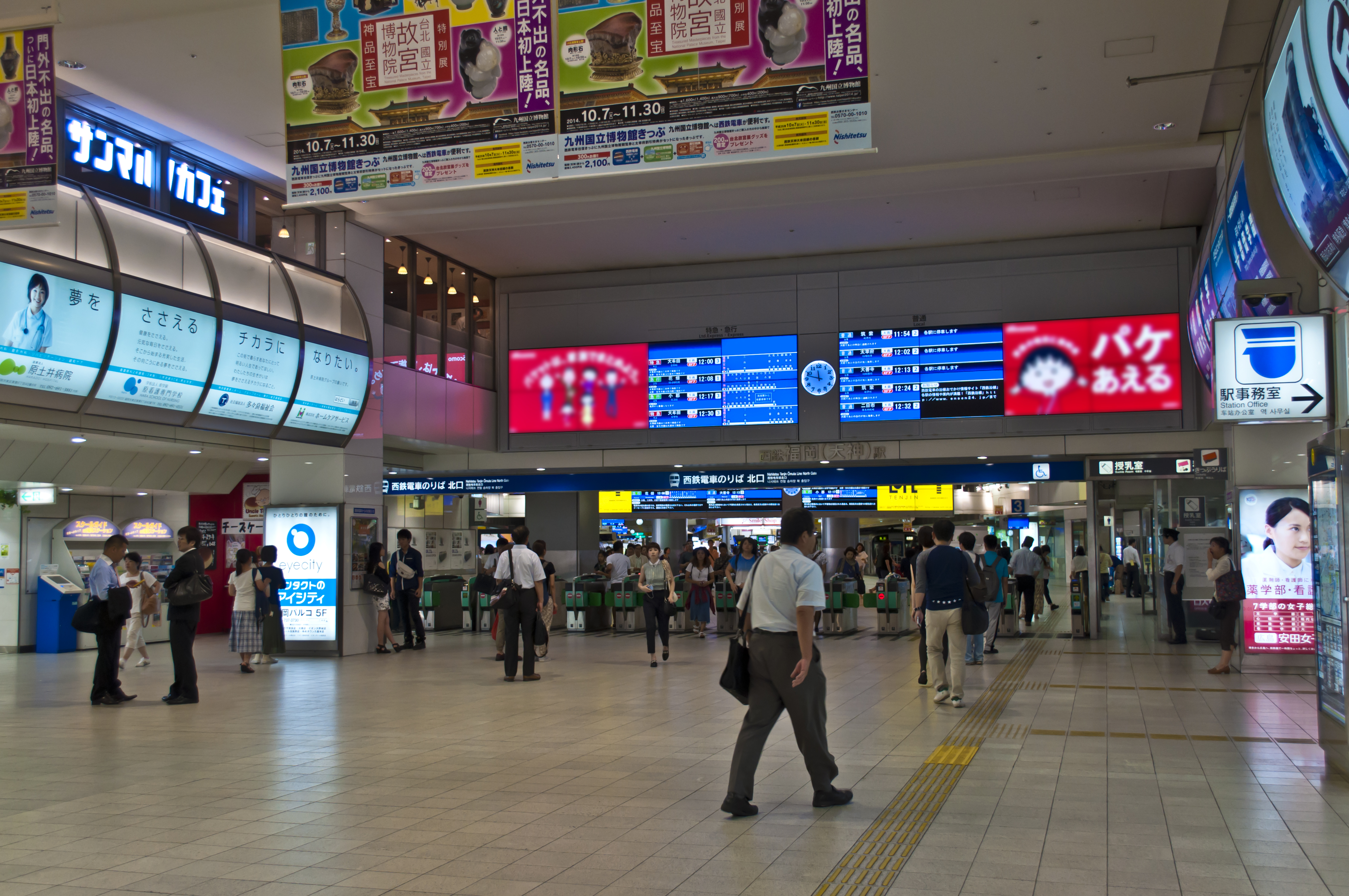
The Fukuoka Tenjin terminal in September 2014

- Track
  - Double: Nishitetsu Fukuoka (Tenjin) - Shikenjōmae, Daizenji - Kamachi, Hiraki - Ōmuta
  - Single: the rest

The line runs approximately parallel with to the JR Kyushu Kagoshima Main Line, but connections between the lines are poor.

== Operations ==
=== Rapid services ===
The operator Nishitetsu offers two types of limited-stop "Rapid" train services in addition to all-stations "Local" trains.

Local (普通, Futsū)
Stops all stations. Between Nishitetsu Fukuoka (Tenjin) and Chikushi or Daizenji inside the line, Nishitetsu Fukuoka (Tenjin) and Dazaifu of Dazaifu Line, Amagi of Amagi Line and Ōmuta. Trains inside the line and Dazaifu Line with 4-7 car EMUs, through trains to Amagi Line with 2-car 7000 and 7050 series EMUs
Express (急行, Kyūkō) (Ex)
Operated all day. Some Expresses are operated as Locals in southern part (Ōmuta side). In day hours, 2 per hour per direction between Nishitetsu Fukuoka (Tenjin) and Nishitetsu Ogōri, and 2 between Nishitetsu Fukuoka and Hanabatake. Five-car 3000 series EMUs, 6-car 2000 and 5000 series EMUs
Limited Express (特急, Tokkyū) (LE)
Between Nishitetsu Fukuoka (Tenjin) and Ōmuta, 2 service per direction per hour. Seven-car 8000 series in day hours, 5000, 6000 and 6050 series EMUs in the morning and evening hours

=== Service pattern ===
During the daytime between 10:00 and 16:00, the numbers of trains per direction per hour are as follows.

Nishitetsu Fukuoka (Tenjin) - Nishitetsu Futsukaichi
2 LE, 4 Ex, 6 Lo
Nishitetsu Futsukaichi - Chikushi
2 LE, 4 Ex, 4 Lo
Chikushi - Nishitetsu Ogōri
2 LE, 2 Ex, 2 Lo (north of Chikushi as Ex), 2 Lo
Nishitetsu Ogōri - Miyanojin
2 LE, 2 Ex, 2 Lo
Miyanojin - Hanabatake
2 LE, 2 Ex, 2 Lo, 2 Lo through to Amagi Line
Hanabatake - Daizenji
2 Lo, 4 Lo
Daizenji - Ōmuta
2 LE, 2 Lo

== Stations ==
All stations are located in Fukuoka Prefecture.

- lower case shows some trains stop
- e1: Expresses only for Chikushi stop
- e2: Expresses only down for Nishitetsu Ogōri, some ups from Hanabatake, Shikenjōmae, Tsubuku, Nishitetsu Yanagawa stop

No.	Station	Distance (km)	Stop	Connections	Location
T 01	Nishitetsu Fukuoka (Tenjin)	0.0	Ex LE	Fukuoka City Subway Airport Line (Tenjin Station); Nanakuma Line (Tenjin Minami Station)	Chūō-ku, Fukuoka
T 02	Yakuin	0.8	Ex LE	Fukuoka City Subway Nanakuma Line	Chūō-ku, Fukuoka
T 03	Nishitetsu Hirao	1.8			Chūō-ku, Fukuoka
T 04	Takamiya	2.9			Minami-ku, Fukuoka
T 05	Ōhashi	4.3	Ex LE		Minami-ku, Fukuoka
T 06	Ijiri	6.1			Minami-ku, Fukuoka
T 07	Zasshonokuma	8.0			Hakata-ku, Fukuoka
T 08	Sakuranamiki				Hakata-ku, Fukuoka
T 09	Kasugabaru	9.5	Ex LE		Kasuga
T 10	Shirakibaru	10.8			Ōnojō
T 11	Shimoōri	11.6	Ex		Ōnojō
T 12	Tofurōmae	13.8			Dazaifu
T 13	Nishitetsu Futsukaichi	15.2	Ex LE	Nishitetsu Dazaifu Line	Chikushino
T 14	Murasaki	16.1	e1		Chikushino
T 15	Asakuragaidō	17.6	Ex		Chikushino
T 16	Sakuradai	19.4	e1		Chikushino
T 17	Chikushi	20.8	Ex		Chikushino
T 18	Tsuko	23.0	e2		Ogōri
T 19	Mikunigaoka	24.1	Ex		Ogōri
T 20	Mitsusawa	25.6	e2		Ogōri
T 21	Ōho	27.0	e2		Ogōri
T 22	Nishitetsu Ogōri	28.7	Ex	Amagi Railroad	Ogōri
T 23	Hatama	30.7	e2		Ogōri
T 24	Ajisaka	33.7	e2		Ogōri
↑ Through service to/from Amagi on the Nishitetsu Amagi Line ↑
T 25	Miyanojin	36.5	Ex	Nishitetsu Amagi Line	Kurume
T 26	Kushiwara	37.7	e2		Kurume
T 27	Nishitetsu Kurume	38.6	Ex LE		Kurume
T 28	Hanabatake	39.5	Ex LE		Kurume
T 29	St. Mary's Hospital	40.1	ex		Kurume
T 30	Tsubuku	41.4	ex		Kurume
T 31	Yasutake	42.8	ex		Kurume
T 32	Daizenji	45.1	Ex LE		Kurume
T 33	Mizuma	46.9	ex		Kurume
T 34	Inuzuka	48.0	ex		Kurume
T 35	Ōmizo	50.6	ex		Ōki
T 36	Hatchōmuta	52.9	ex		Ōki
T 37	Kamachi	55.5	ex		Yanagawa
T 38	Yakabe	57.3	ex		Yanagawa
T 39	Nishitetsu Yanagawa	58.4	Ex LE		Yanagawa
T 40	Tokumasu	59.7			Yanagawa
T 41	Shiotsuka	61.1			Yanagawa
T 42	Nishitetsu Nakashima	63.5			Yanagawa
T 43	Enoura	65.1			Miyama
T 44	Hiraki	66.6			Miyama
T 45	Nishitetsu Wataze	67.9			Ōmuta
T 46	Kuranaga	69.6			Ōmuta
T 47	Higashi-Amagi	70.8			Ōmuta
T 48	Nishitetsu Ginsui	72.1			Ōmuta
T 49	Shin-Sakaemachi	73.7	Ex LE		Ōmuta
T 50	Ōmuta	74.8	Ex LE	Kagoshima Main Line	Ōmuta

== Rolling stock ==
New three- and two-car 9000 series electric multiple unit trains were introduced on the line from March 2017.

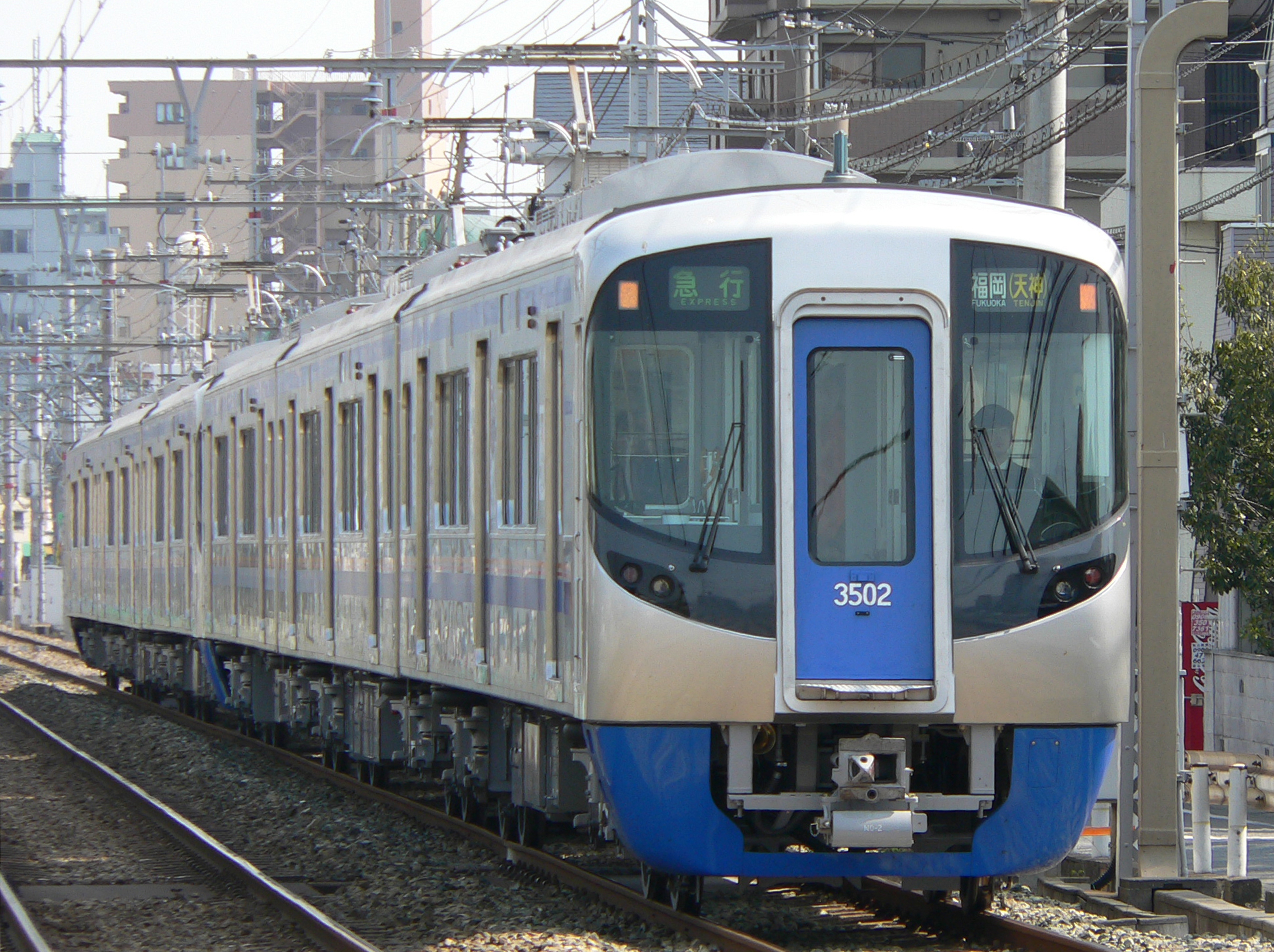
A 3000 series EMU

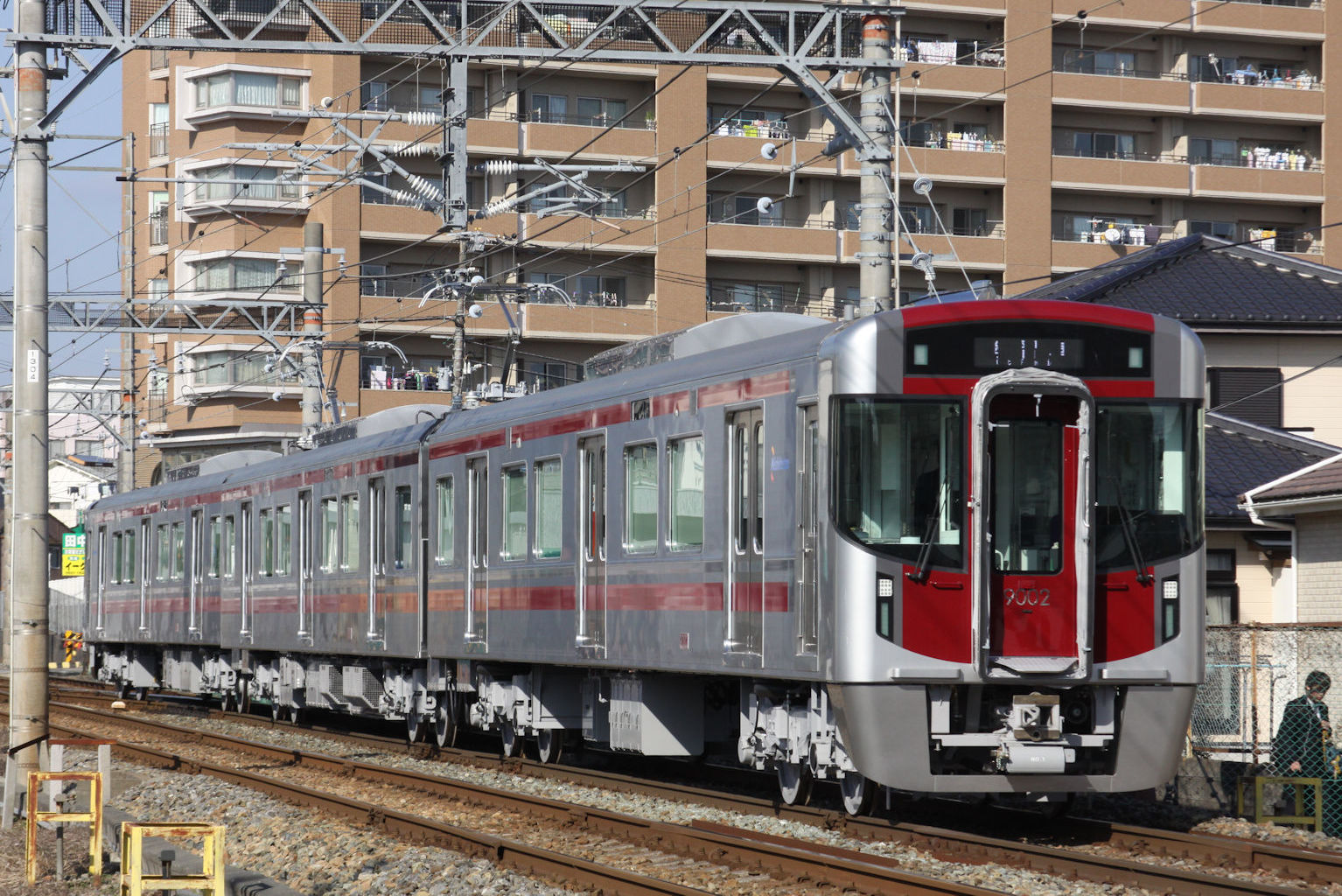
A 9000 series EMU

== History ==
The Kyushu Railway (九州鉄道, Kyūshū Tetsudō) (Note: This company was the second. The first built and operated, in Meiji period, nearly all the railway lines in Kyushu, and was nationalized in 1907.) built and operated the first Interurban railway line in Kyushu from Fukuoka, planned to extend to Kumamoto, but difficulty in securing a corridor south of Omuta resulted in that plan being abandoned.

- 12 April 1924: Fukuoka (presently Nishitetsu Fukuoka (Tenjin)) - Kurume (presently Nishitetsu Kurume) opened by the Kyushu Railway (II). 1,435mm gauge, electrified, double tracked.
- 28 December 1932: Kurume - Tsubuku opened, single tracked.
- 22 June 1937: The Ōkawa Railway was merged into the Kyushu Railway. Kamikurume - Tsubuku - Daizenji - Enokizu became a part of Kūshū Railway network, single tracked, 1,067 mm (3 ft 6 in) gauge.
- 1 October 1937: Tsubuku - Daizenji of ex-Ōkawa Railway regauged to 1,435 mm (4 ft 8 1/2 in) (the remainder abandoned later). Daizenji - Yanagawa (presently Nishitetsu Yanagawa) opened.
- 1 December 1938: Fukuoka - Tsubuku from Tram Act to Local Railway Act.
- 1 September 1938: Yanagawa - Nakashima (presently Nishitetsu Nakashima) opened.
- 1 October 1938: Nakashima - Sakaemachi (presently Shin-Sakaemachi) opened.
- 1 July 1939: Sakaemachi - Ōmuta opened, the line completed.
- 19 September 1942: Kyushu Electric Tramway (九州電気軌道, Kyūshū Denki Kidō) merged, under wartime condition, Kyushu Railway and some other railway companies in Fukuoka Prefecture.
- 22 September 1942: Kyushu Electric Tramway renamed Nishi-Nippon Railroad, the line became its Ōmuta Line.
- 11 November 1951: Nishitetsu Kurume - Shikenjōmae track doubled.
- 20 March 1960: Kuranaga - Nishitetsu Ginsui track doubled.
- April 1961: Nishitetsu Ginsui - Sakaemachi track doubled.
- 21 June 1961: Sakaemachi -. Ōmuta track doubled.
- 20 November 1965: Hiraki - Kuranaga track doubled.
- February, 1967: Daizenji - Mizuma, Ōmizo - Kamachi track doubled.
- 10 June 1974: CTC signalling is commissioned on the entire line.
- 15 January 1997: Mizuma - Ōmizo track doubled.
- 1 January 2001: Proper names changed to Tenjin-Ōmuta Line from Ōmuta Line, Nishitetsu Fukuoka (Tenjin) Station (with Tenjin in parentheses) from Nishitetsu Fukuoka Station.
- 16 February 2008: The maximum speed on the line is increased from 100 km/h to 110 km/h.
- 27 March 2010: Rapid Express (快速急行, Kaisoku Kyūkō) and Non-Stop (直行, Chokkō) services were discontinued.
- 28 August 2022: The section between Zasshonokuma and Shimoōri stations was elevated, resulting in the removal of several level crossings.
- 16 March 2024: New station at Sakuranamiki opened.
