= Shin-Sakaemachi Station (Fukuoka) =

Railway station in Ōmuta, Fukuoka Prefecture, Japan

Shin-Sakaemachi Station 新栄町駅
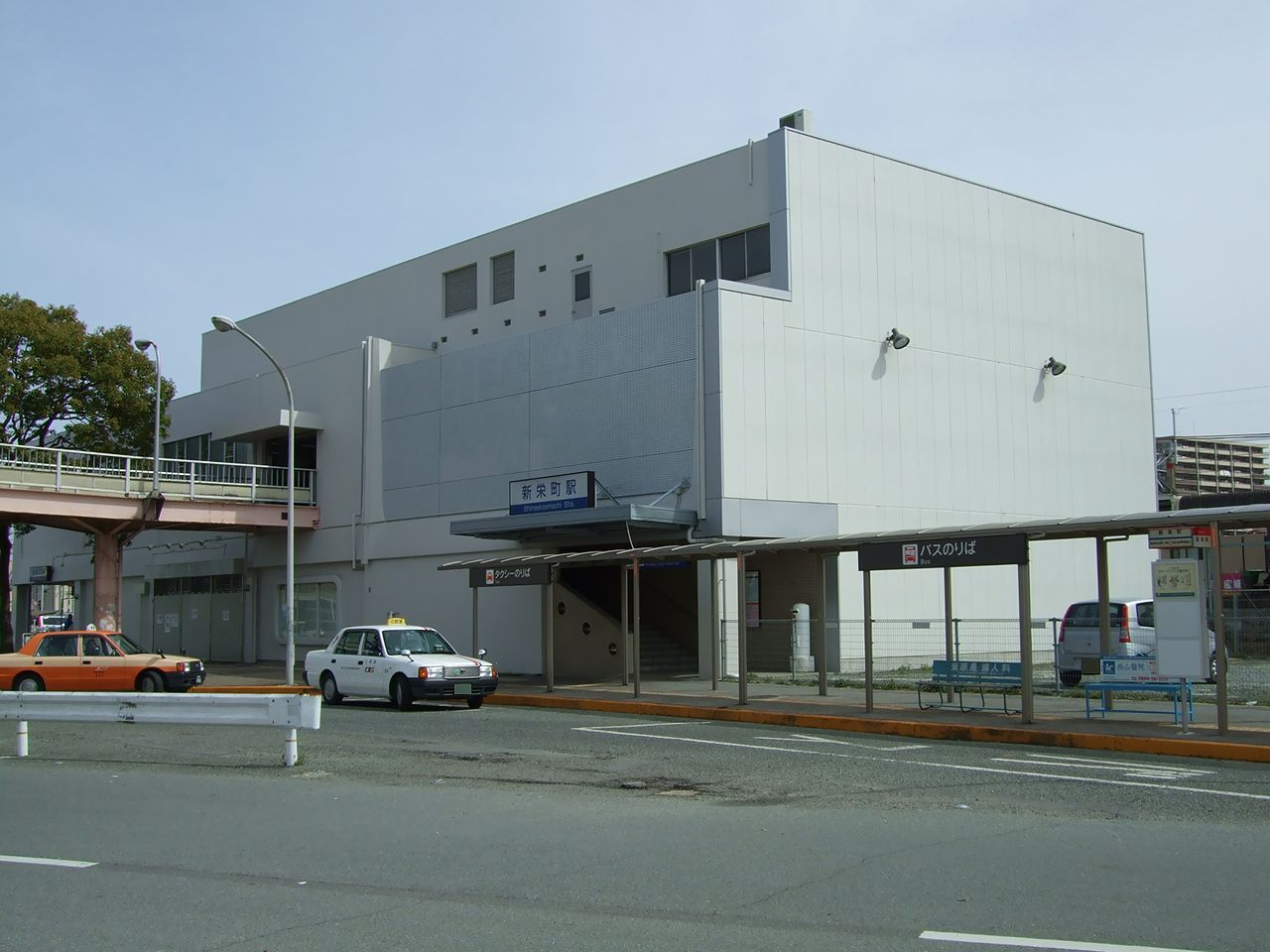
- Shin-Sakaemachi Station building

General information
- Location: Shinsakaemachi, Ōmuta-shi, Fukuoka-ken 836-0041; Japan
- Coordinates: 33°2′18.44″N 130°26′58.56″E
- Operator: Nishi-Nippon Railroad
- Line: ■ Tenjin Ōmuta Line
- Distance: 73.3 km from Nishitetsu Fukuoka (Tenjin)
- Platforms: 1 island platform
- Connections

Other information
- Status: Unstaffed
- Station code: T49
- Website: Official website

History
- Opened: 1 October 1938
- Former names: Sakaemachi (to 1939); Kyutetsu Sakaemachi (to 1942); Nishitetsu Sakaemachi (to 1970)

Passengers
- FY2022: 3365

Services
Preceding station	Nishitetsu	Following station
Nishitetsu Ginsui towards Nishitetsu Fukuoka (Tenjin)	Tenjin Ōmuta Line Local	Ōmuta Terminus
Nishitetsu Yanagawa towards Nishitetsu Fukuoka (Tenjin)	Tenjin Ōmuta Line Express	Ōmuta Terminus
Nishitetsu Yanagawa towards Nishitetsu Fukuoka (Tenjin)	Tenjin Ōmuta Line Limited Express	Ōmuta Terminus
Location
- Location within Fukuoka Prefecture Location within Japan

Shin-Sakaemachi Station (新栄町駅, Shin-Sakaemachi-eki) is a passenger railway station located in the city of Ōmuta, Fukuoka, Japan. It is operated by the private transportation company Nishi-Nippon Railroad (NNR), and has station number T49.

== Lines ==
The station is served by the Nishitetsu Tenjin Ōmuta Line and is 73.3 kilometers from the starting point of the line at Nishitetsu Fukuoka (Tenjin) Station.

== Station layout ==
The station consists of one elevated island platform with an elevated station building above the platform.

=== Platforms ===
1	■ Tenjin Ōmuta Line	for Ōmuta
2	■ Tenjin Ōmuta Line	for Daizenji, Nishitetsu Kurume, Nishitetsu Futsukaichi, Fukuoka and Nishitetsu Yanagawa

== Gallery ==
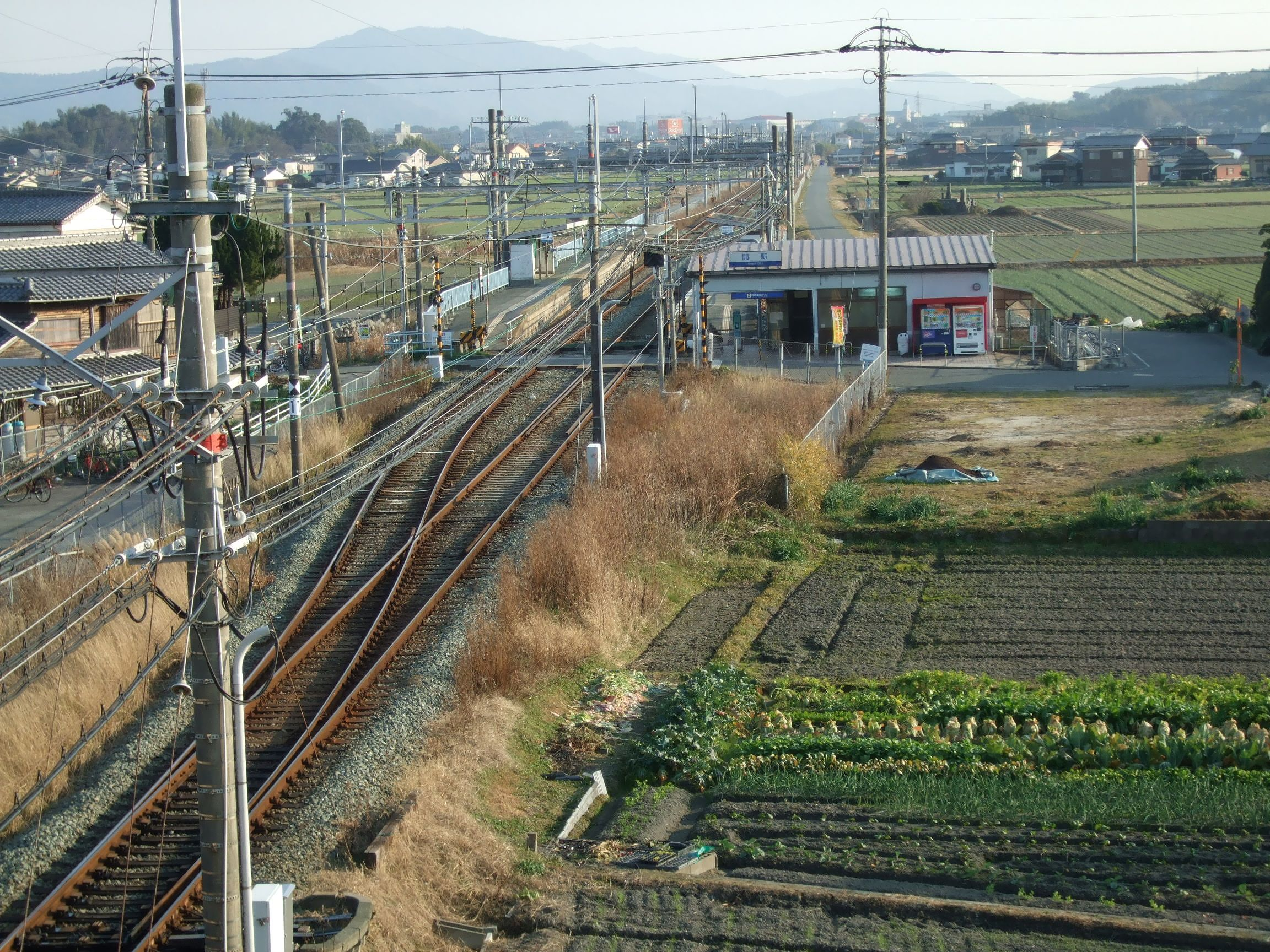
Panoramic view of the premises. The front is towards Fukuoka (Tenjin) and the back is towards Omuta.

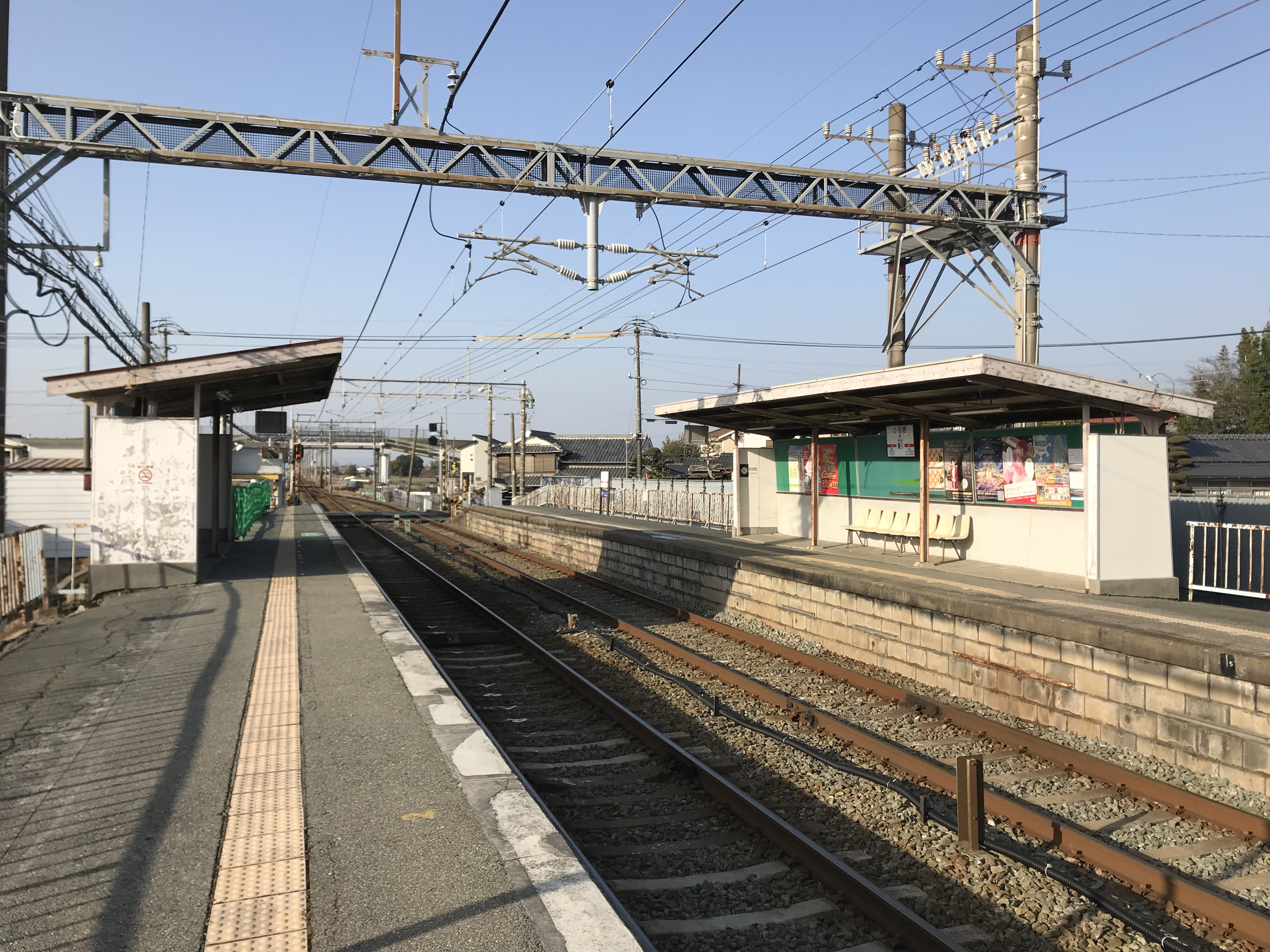
Platform

== History ==
The station opened on 1 October 1938 as Sakaemachi Station (栄町駅). The station name was changed to Kyutetsu Sakaemachi Station (九鉄栄町駅) on 1 July 1939. The company merged with the Kyushu Electric Tramway on 19 September 1942. The company changed its name to Nishi-Nippon Railway three days later, on 22 September 1942 and the station was renamed Nishitetsu Sakaemachi Station (西鉄栄町駅) . It was relocated to its present location renamed again to its present name on 28 April 1970.

== Passenger statistics ==
In fiscal 2022, the station was used by 3365 passengers daily.

== Surrounding area ==
- Mitsui Chemicals Omuta Plant
- Mitsui Kinzoku Mining Miike Factory
- Omuta Asahimachi Post Office

== See also ==
- List of railway stations in Japan
