= Nishitetsu Yanagawa Station =

Railway station in Yanagawa, Fukuoka Prefecture, Japan

Nishitetsu Yanagawa Station 西鉄柳川駅
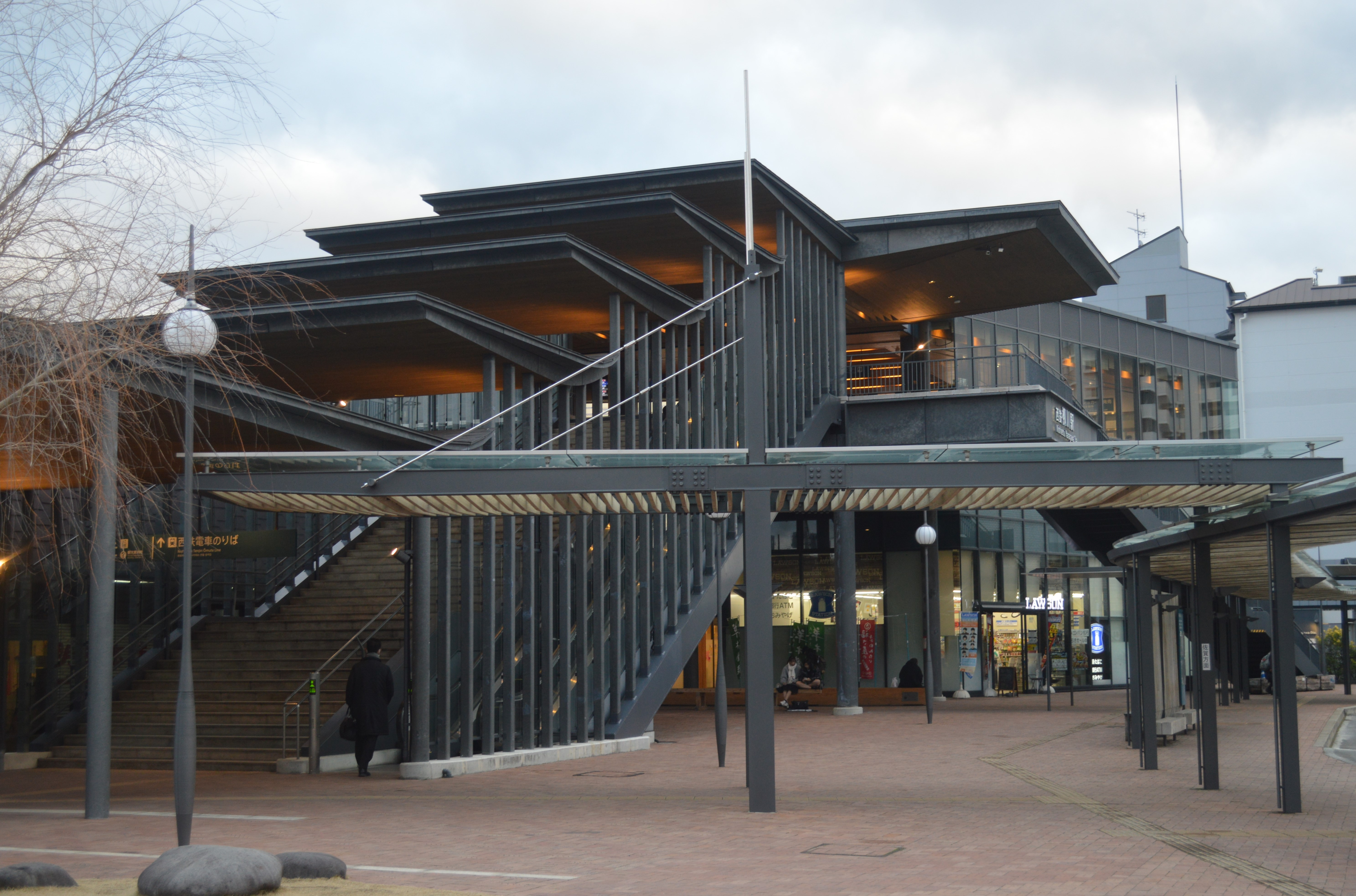
- Nishitetsu Yanagawa Station

General information
- Location: Mitsuhashimachi Shimohyakuchō, Yanagawa-shi, Fukuoka-ken 832-0822; Japan
- Coordinates: 33°9′53.9″N 130°25′8.38″E
- Operator: Nishi-Nippon Railroad
- Line: ■ Tenjin Ōmuta Line
- Distance: 58.4 km from Nishitetsu Fukuoka (Tenjin)
- Platforms: 2 island platforms
- Connections

Other information
- Status: Staffed
- Station code: T39
- Website: Official website

History
- Opened: 1 October 1937
- Former names: Yanagawa (to 1939); Kyutetsu Yanagawa (to 1942)

Passengers
- FY2022: 10,072

Services
Preceding station	Nishitetsu	Following station
Yakabe towards Nishitetsu Fukuoka (Tenjin)	Tenjin Ōmuta Line Local	Tokumasu towards Ōmuta
Daizenji towards Nishitetsu Fukuoka (Tenjin)	Tenjin Ōmuta Line Express	Shin-Sakaemachi towards Ōmuta
Daizenji towards Nishitetsu Fukuoka (Tenjin)	Tenjin Ōmuta Line Limited Express	Shin-Sakaemachi towards Ōmuta
Location
- Location within Fukuoka Prefecture Location within Japan

Nishitetsu Yanagawa Station (西鉄柳川駅, Nishitetsu-Yamagawa-eki) is a passenger railway station located in the city of Yanagawa, Fukuoka, Japan. It is operated by the private transportation company Nishi-Nippon Railroad (NNR), and has station number T39.

== Lines ==
The station is served by the Nishitetsu Tenjin Ōmuta Line and is 58.4 kilometers from the starting point of the line at Nishitetsu Fukuoka (Tenjin) Station.

== Station layout ==
The station consists of two island platforms connected by an elevated station building.

== Platforms ==
1	■ Tenjin Ōmuta Line	for Ōmuta
2	■ Tenjin Ōmuta Line	for Ōmuta
3	■ Tenjin Ōmuta Line	for Kurume, Futsukaichi and Fukuoka
4	■ Tenjin Ōmuta Line	for Kurume, Futsukaichi and Fukuoka

== History ==
The station opened on 1 October 1937 as Yanagawa Station (中島駅) on the Kyushu Railway. The station name was changed to Kyutetsu Nakashima Station (九鉄中島駅) on 1 July 1939. The company merged with the Kyushu Electric Tramway on 19 September 1942. The company changed its name to Nishi-Nippon Railway three days later, on 22 September 1942 and the station was renamed to its present name.

== Passenger statistics ==
In fiscal 2022, the station was used by 10,072 passengers daily.

== Surrounding area ==
- Yanagawa Gokoku Shrine
- Yanagawa Depot
- Yanagawa City Hall Yanagawa Government Building/Mitsuhashi

== See also ==
- List of railway stations in Japan
