= Ōmuta Station =

Railway station in Ōmuta, Fukuoka Prefecture, Japan

JB 27 Ōmuta Station 大牟田駅
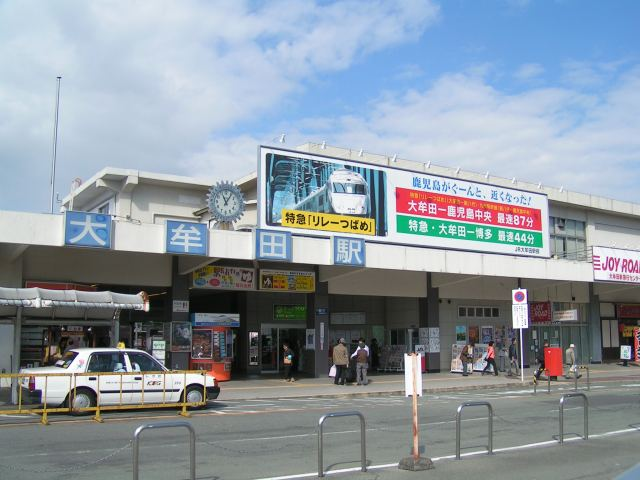
- Ōmuta Station in 2005

General information
- Location: Shiranuhi-machi 1-chōme (JR), Kubota-machi 2-chōme (Nishitetsu); Ōmuta-shi, Fukuoka-ken; Japan
- Coordinates: 33°01′46″N 130°26′38″E
- Operator: JR Kyūshū; Nishi-Nippon Railroad
- Lines: JB Kagoshima Main Line; ■ Tenjin Ōmuta Line
- Distance: 147.5 km from Mojikō (Kagoshima Main Line); 74.8 km from Tenjin (Tenjin Ōmuta Line)
- Platforms: 1 side + 1 island + 3 bay platforms
- Tracks: 6 + numerous passing loops and sidings
- Connections: Bus terminal

Construction
- Structure type: At grade

Other information
- Status: Staffed ticket window (Midori no Madoguchi)
- Station code: JA28 (JR); T50 (NNR)
- Website: Official website

History
- Opened: 1 April 1891

Passengers
- FY2020: 1783 daily (JR); 6457 daily (NNR)

Services
Preceding station	JR Kyushu	Following station
Arao JB 28 towards Kagoshima	Kagoshima Main Line Local	Ginsui JB 26 towards Mojikō
Arao JB 28 towards Kagoshima	Kagoshima Main Line Limited Express	Setaka JB 22 towards Mojikō
Arao JB 28 towards Kagoshima	Kagoshima Main Line Rapid	Setaka JB 22 towards Mojikō
Preceding station	Nishitetsu	Following station
Shin-Sakaemachi towards Nishitetsu Fukuoka (Tenjin)	Tenjin Ōmuta Line	Terminus
Location
- Location within Fukuoka Prefecture Location within Japan

Ōmuta Station (大牟田駅, Ōmuta-eki) is a junction passenger railway station located in the city of Ōmuta, Fukuoka Prefecture, Japan. It is shared by JR Kyushu (operating the Kagoshima Main Line) and the Nishi-Nippon Railroad (Nishitetsu), operating the Tenjin Ōmuta Line.

== Lines ==
The station is served by the Kagoshima Main Line and is located 147.5 km from the starting point of the line at Mojiko.

In addition, the station is the southern terminus of the Tenjin Ōmuta Line and is located 74.8 km from the starting point of the line at Tenjin.

== Layout ==
The JR Kyushu part of the station consists of an elevated side platform and island platform (platforms 1–3) serving three tracks, with the station facilities underneath. The Nishitetsu part consists of three tracks served by three bay platforms. One bay platform is one sided and is designated as platforms 4. The other two bays are two sided, platforms 5-6 serving one track and 7-8 another. A large number of passing loops and sidings are located between the JR and Nishitetsu platforms. In addition, another group of sidings branch off track 1 on the JR side.

== Platforms ==
=== JR Kyūshū ===
1	■ Express "Ariake"	for Kumamoto
1	■ Kagoshima Main Line	for Tamana, Kumamoto and Yatsushiro
2	■ Kagoshima Main Line	for Tamana, Kumamoto and Yatsushiro
2	■ Kagoshima Main Line	for Kurume, Hakata and Kokura
3	■ Express "Ariake"	for Kurume and Hakata
3	■ Kagoshima Main Line	for Kurume, Hakata and Kokura

=== Nishi-Nippon Railroad ===
4	■ Tenjin Ōmuta Line	for Yanagawa, Kurume, Fukuoka and Amagi
5	■ Tenjin Ōmuta Line	for Yanagawa, Kurume, Fukuoka and Amagi
6	■ Tenjin Ōmuta Line	Only Exit
7	■ Tenjin Ōmuta Line	for Yanagawa, Kurume, Fukuoka
8	■ Tenjin Ōmuta Line	Only Exit

== History ==
The privately run Kyushu Railway had opened a stretch of track between Hakata and the (now closed) Chitosegawa temporary stop on 11 December 1889. After several phases of expansion northwards and southwards, by February 1891, the line stretched from Kurosaki south to Kurume. In the next phase of expansion, the track was extended south to Takase (now Tamana) opening as the new southern terminus on 1 April 1891. Ōmuta was opened on the same day as one of several intermediate stations on the new stretch of track. When the Kyushu Railway was nationalized on 1 July 1907, Japanese Government Railways (JGR) took over control of the station. On 12 October 1909, the station became part of the Hitoyoshi Main Line and then on 21 November 1909, part of the Kagoshima Main Line. On 1 July 1939, the Nishitetsu Tenjin Ōmuta Line commenced its service to the station. On 1 April 1987, with the privatization of Japanese National Railways (JNR), the successor of JGR, JR Kyushu took over control of the station.

== Passenger statistics ==
In fiscal 2016, the station was used by an average of 3,014 passengers daily (boarding passengers only), and it ranked 61st among the busiest stations of JR Kyushu.

== Surrounding area ==
- Japan National Route 208
- Omuta City Hall
- Omuta City Omuta Chuo Elementary School

== See also ==
- List of railway stations in Japan
