= Nishitetsu Fukuoka (Tenjin) Station =

Railway station in Fukuoka, Japan

Nishitetsu Fukuoka (Tenjin) Station 西鉄福岡（天神）駅
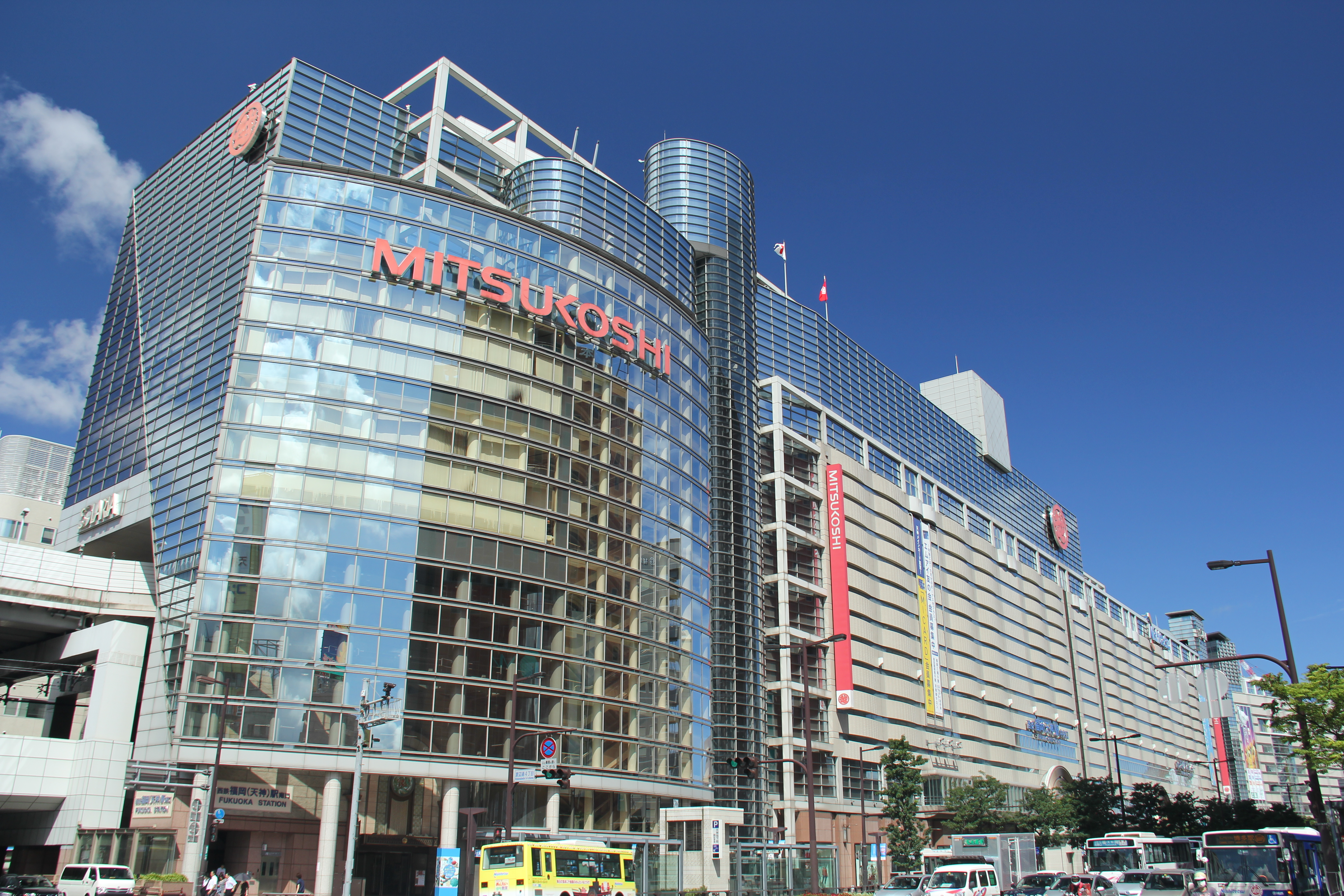
- Nishitetsu Fukuoka (Tenjin) Station

General information
- Location: 11-2 2-chōme Tenjin, Chūō-ku, Fukuoka-shi, Fukuoka-ken; Japan
- Coordinates: 33°35′19.6″N 130°23′59.6″E
- Operator: Nishi-Nippon Railroad
- Line: ■ Tenjin Ōmuta Line
- Platforms: 6 bay platforms
- Tracks: 3

Construction
- Structure type: elevated
- Accessible: Yes

Other information
- Station code: T01

History
- Opened: 12 April 1924; 102 years ago
- Former names: Kyūtetsu Fukuoka Station (to 1942); Nishitetsu Fukuoka Station (to 2001)

Passengers
- FY2022: 109,641

Services
Preceding station	Nishitetsu	Following station
Terminus	Tenjin Ōmuta Line	Yakuin towards Ōmuta
Location
- Location within Fukuoka Prefecture Location within Japan

Nishitetsu-Fukuoka (Tenjin) Station (西鉄福岡（天神）駅, Nishitetsu-Fukuoka (Tenjin)-eki) is a railway station in Chūō-ku, Fukuoka, operated by the private railway operator Nishi-Nippon Railroad, and has station number T01.

== Lines ==
The station is the northern terminus of the Nishitetsu Tenjin Ōmuta Line and is 74.8 kilometers from the opposing terminus of the line at Ōmuta Station.

== Layout ==
The station is located on the second floor of the Solaria Terminal Building within the Mitsukoshi Building. It uses the Spanish solution with 3 dead-end lines. After the train arrives, the doors open on the middle platform to let the passengers out. After this, the doors on the opposite side will open and the waiting passengers can enter the train.

=== Platforms ===
- Track 1 - Mainly used by express trains
- Track 2 - Mainly used by local trains
- Track 3 - Mainly used by limited express trains

=== North Exit ===
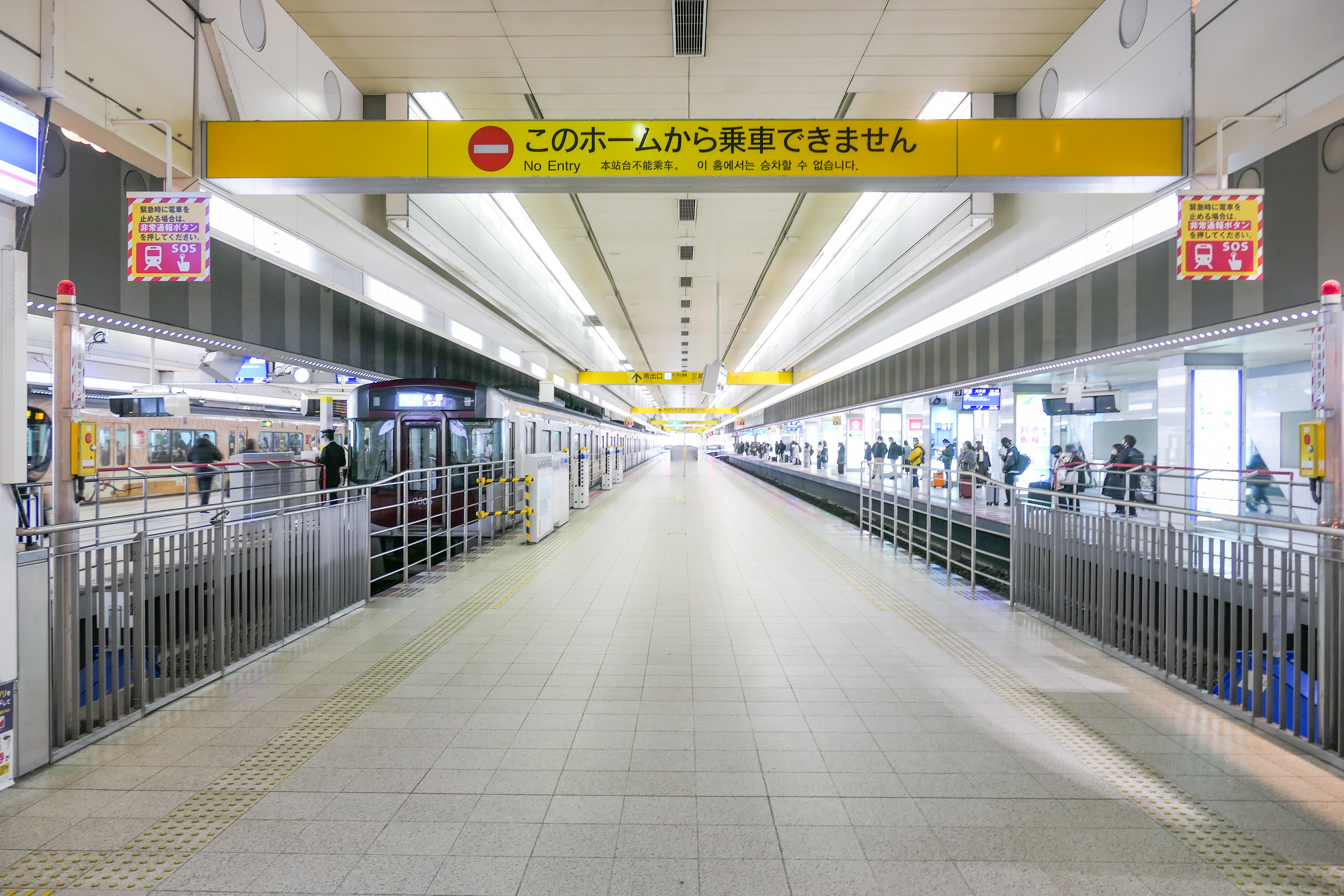
Platforms 2 and 3

With the biggest ticket gate, located on the second floor. Access to Solaria Stage (ソラリアステージ, soraria-sutēji) department store via a concourse. There are two station offices, three coin locker rows, an ATM corner and an Internet corner. It is also the nearest exit gate for transfer to the Airport Line and Hakozaki Line on the Fukuoka City Subway.

=== Solaria Exit ===
West of the North Exit with access to the Solaria Plaza (ソラリアプラザ, Soraria-puraza) Building.

=== Central Exit ===
Located on the first floor. There are coin lockers and a season ticket counter. Transfer to the Nishitetsu Tenjin Bus Center via elevator.

=== South Exit ===
Located on the first floor, facing the road. There is a season ticket counter and it is the nearest exit gate for transfer to the Nanakuma Line on the Fukuoka City Subway.

== History ==
- April 12, 1924 – the station opened.
- Around 1935 – renamed Kyūtetsu Fukuoka Station (九鉄福岡駅).
- September 22, 1942 – renamed Nishitetsu Fukuoka Station (西鉄福岡駅).
- November 1, 1961 – station moved to 2nd floor.
- September 27, 1997 – improvement work was completed.
- September 1997 – Solaria Terminal Building was completed 80 m north of the former location (now Solaria Stage). Fukuoka Mitsukoshi department store entered as core tenant, competing with the nearby Iwataya Z-SIDE and Daimaru department stores.
- January 1, 2001 – renamed Nishitetsu Fukuoka (Tenjin) Station.

== Passenger statistics ==
In fiscal 2022, the station was used by 109,641 passengers daily.

== See also ==
- List of railway stations in Japan
