= Index of Japan-related articles (O) =

This page lists Japan-related articles with romanized titles beginning with the letter O. For names of people, please list by surname (i.e., "Tarō Yamada" should be listed under "Y", not "T"). Please also ignore particles (e.g. "a", "an", "the") when listing articles (i.e., "A City with No People" should be listed under "City").

== Oa ==
- Oasa, Hiroshima

== Ob ==
- Sakae Ōba
- Ōbaku (school of Buddhism)
- Obama, Fukui
- Obanazawa, Yamagata
- Obara, Aichi
- Obata, Mie
- Obatake, Yamaguchi
- Obi (sash)
- Obihiro, Hokkaidō
- Obu, Aichi
- Keizo Obuchi

== Oc ==
- Occupied Japan
- Ochanomizu Station
- Ochazuke
- Ochi District, Ehime
- Ōchi District, Shimane
- Ochi, Kōchi
- Ochi, Shimane
- Ochiai, Okayama

== Od ==
- Oda Chikazane
- Oda clan
- Oda District, Okayama
- Eiichiro Oda
- Oda Nagamasu
- Oda Nobuhide
- Oda Nobunaga
- Oda Nobuyuki
- Oda Sakunosuke
- Oda, Ehime
- Ōda, Shimane
- Joe Odagiri
- Odai, Mie
- Odaiba
- Odakyu Electric Railway
- Odakyu Odawara Line
- Ōdate, Akita
- Odawara, Kanagawa

== Oe ==
- Oe District, Tokushima
- Kenzaburō Ōe
- Ōe no Hiromoto
- Oe, Kyoto

== Of ==
- Ōfunato, Iwate

== Og ==
- Oga, Akita
- Oga Yashiro
- Ōgaki, Gifu
- Ogaki, Hiroshima
- Ogasa District, Shizuoka
- Ogasa, Shizuoka
- Ogasawara Islands
- Ken Ogata
- Ogata Kenzan
- Ogata Kōrin
- Ogata, Kōchi
- Ogata, Ōita
- Ogawa, Kumamoto
- Marumi Ogawa
- Ogi District, Saga
- Ogi, Ōita
- Ogi, Saga
- Ogimi, Okinawa
- Ogori, Fukuoka
- Ogori, Yamaguchi
- Oguchi, Aichi
- Oguni, Kumamoto
- Oguri Mushitaro

== Oh ==
- Oh My Goddess!
- Ohara District, Shimane
- Ohara, Okayama
- Ōharu, Aichi
- Ohashi Kannon-ji
- Masayoshi Ohira
- Naoto Ohshima
- Ohito, Shizuoka
- Ohka
- Hideo Ohkubo

== Oi ==
- Oigawa, Shizuoka
- Ōita District, Ōita
- Ōita Prefecture
- Ōita, Ōita

== Oj ==
- Ōji, Nara
- Ojigi
- Ojiya, Niigata

== Ok ==
- Kiyoshi Oka
- Okabe, Shizuoka
- Okachimachi Station
- Keisuke Okada
- Okadama Airport
- Okagaki, Fukuoka
- Okakura Kakuzo
- Okamoto Kanoko
- Okamoto Kido
- Okawa, Fukuoka
- Ōkawa, Kōchi
- Okawachi, Hyōgo
- Okaya
- Okayama Prefecture
- Okayama, Okayama
- Okazaki, Aichi
- Okazaki Castle
- Okazaki fragment
- Ritsuko Okazaki
- Okegawa, Saitama
- Oki District, Shimane
- Oki Province
- Oki, Fukuoka
- Okimi, Hiroshima
- Okinawa diet
- Okinawa Prefecture
- Okinawan weapons
- Okinawa, Okinawa
- Okinawan language
- Okita Sōji
- Okonomiyaki
- Oku District, Okayama
- Oku, Okayama
- Ōkubo-ji
- Ōkubo Toshimichi
- Ōkuchi, Kagoshima
- Okuchichibu Mountains
- Okudaira Sadamasa
- Ōkuma Shigenobu
- Okutsu, Okayama

== Ol ==
- The Old Capital
- Olympus Corporation
- Olympus C-770 Movie
- Olympus C-8080 Wide Zoom

== Om ==
- Ōmachi, Nagano
- Ōmachi, Saga
- Omaezaki, Shizuoka
- Ōmagari, Akita
- Ōme, Tokyo
- Omogo, Ehime
- Ōmi Province
- Ōmihachiman, Shiga
- Ōmishima, Ehime
- Ōmishima Island, Ehime
- Ōmisoka
- Omiya, Mie
- Ōmiya-ku, Saitama
- Omoikane (Shinto)
- Ōmura, Nagasaki
- Ōmura Masujirō
- Omuta, Fukuoka

== On ==
- On Kawara
- Ondo (music)
- Ondo, Hiroshima
- One Piece
- One Year War
- Onejime, Kagoshima
- Onga District, Fukuoka
- Onga, Fukuoka
- Oni (folklore)
- Onigawara
- Onigiri
- Onigokko
- Oniisama e
- Ōnin War
- Ōnishi, Ehime
- Onix
- Onmyōdō
- Onna, Okinawa
- Ono, Hyōgo
- Ono, Fukui
- Ono, Fukushima
- Ono, Gifu
- Ōno, Hiroshima
- Ōno, Hokkaidō
- Ōno, Iwate
- Ōno, Ōita
- Ōno District, Fukui
- Ōno District, Gifu
- Ōno District, Ōita
- Ono no Komachi
- Ōno River
- Shinji Ono
- Yoko Ono
- Onoda, Yamaguchi
- Hiroo Onoda
- Onoe Saishu
- Onohara, Kagawa
- Ōnojō, Fukuoka
- Onomi, Kōchi
- Onomichi, Hiroshima
- Onsen
- Onsen District, Ehime
- Onsen, Hyōgo

== Oo ==
- Ooka Shohei
- Ōoka Tadasuke
- Oomoto
- Ōoku
- Oozaru

== Op ==
- Operation Stardust

== Or ==
- Orient Watch
- Origami
- Original video animation
- Orix BlueWave
- Oroshi hocho
- Oroshigane
- Orphen

== Os ==
- Osa, Okayama
- Osafune, Okayama
- Osaka Aquarium Kaiyukan
- Osaka Bay
- Osaka Castle
- Osaka Eco Agricultural Products
- Osaka International Airport
- Osaka Line
- Osaka Loop Line
- Osaka Monorail
- Osaka Municipal Subway
- Osaka Prefecture
- Osaka Station
- Osaka, Osaka
- Osaka Tower
- Ōsakasayama, Osaka
- Ōsaki Station
- Ōsaki, Kagoshima
- Ōsakikamijima, Hiroshima
- Osechi
- Mamoru Oshii
- Shunrō Oshikawa
- Oshikura Manju
- Oshima, Fukuoka
- Oshima, Yamaguchi
- Ōshima District, Kagoshima
- Ōshima District, Yamaguchi
- Nagisa Oshima
- Oshima Subprefecture
- Towa Oshima
- Oshiruko
- Oshizushihako
- Sakae Osugi
- Osuka, Shizuoka
- Osumi Province
- Osumi, Kagoshima

== Ot ==
- Ōta Dōkan
- Fusae Ota
- Ōta, Gunma
- Ōta, Ōita
- Ōta, Tokyo
- Masahide Ota
- Ōtake, Hiroshima
- Otaku
- Otaku no Video
- Otaru, Hokkaidō
- Ōtawara, Tochigi
- Oto, Fukuoka
- Oto, Nara
- Oto, Wakayama
- Otokuni District, Kyoto
- Katsuhiro Otomo
- Ōtomo no Yakamochi
- Otomo Yoshihide
- Otoshi buta
- Otowa, Aichi
- Ōtoyo, Kōchi
- Ōtsu, Shiga
- Otsu District, Yamaguchi
- Ōtsuki, Yamanashi
- Ōtsuki, Kōchi

== Ou ==
- Ouchi, Saga
- Ōuchiyama, Mie
- Ouda, Nara
- Ōura, Kagoshima
- Outlaw Star

== Ow ==
- Owari Province
- Owariasahi, Aichi
- Owase, Mie

== Ov ==
- Overman King Gainer

== Oy ==
- Oyabe, Toyama
- Oyakoba
- Oyakodon
- Ōyama, Ōita
- Oyama, Shizuoka
- Oyama, Tochigi
- Ōyama Iwao
- Oyama Shrine (Ishikawa)
- Oyamada, Mie
- Ōyamazaki, Kyoto
- Oyano, Kumamoto
- Ōyodo, Nara

== Oz ==
- Ozaki Koyo
- Ozato, Okinawa
- Ōzeki
- Ōzu, Ehime
- Ōzu, Kumamoto
- Yasujirō Ozu
