= Inuzuka Station =

Railway station in Kurume, Fukuoka Prefecture, Japan

Inuzuka Station 犬塚駅
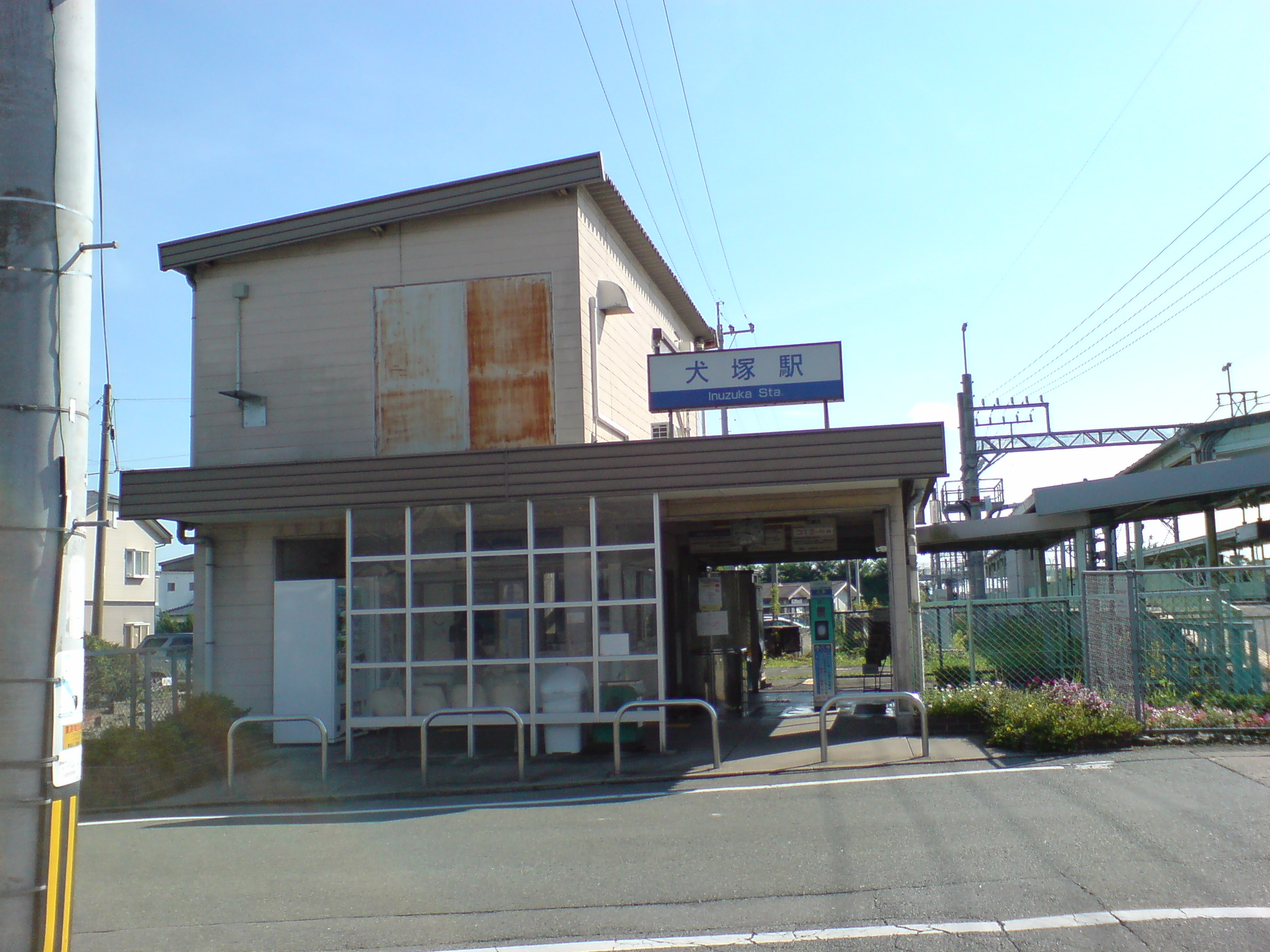
- Inuzuka Station building

General information
- Location: Mizumamachi Tamamitsu, Kurume-shi, Fukuoka-ken 830-0112; Japan
- Coordinates: 33°14′50.61″N 130°27′46.53″E
- Operator: Nishi-Nippon Railroad
- Line: ■ Tenjin Ōmuta Line
- Distance: 48.0 km from Nishitetsu Fukuoka (Tenjin)
- Platforms: 2 side platforms
- Connections

Construction
- Structure type: At-grade

Other information
- Status: Unstaffed
- Station code: T34
- Website: Official website

History
- Opened: 1 October 1937

Passengers
- FY2022: 992

Services
| Preceding station | Nishitetsu | Following station |
|---|---|---|
| Mizuma towards Nishitetsu Fukuoka (Tenjin) | Tenjin Ōmuta Line Local | Ōmizo towards Ōmuta |
Location
- Location within Fukuoka Prefecture Location within Japan

Inuzuka Station (犬塚駅, Inuzuka-eki) is a passenger railway station located in the city of Kurume, Fukuoka, Japan. It is operated by the private transportation company Nishi-Nippon Railroad (NNR), and has station number T34.

== Lines ==
The station is served by the Nishitetsu Tenjin Ōmuta Line and is 48.0 kilometres (29.8 mi) from the line's starting point at Nishitetsu Fukuoka (Tenjin) Station.

== Station layout ==
The station consists of a two opposed side platform connected by a level crossing The area around Inuzuka Station was single track until the section between Mizuma and Omizo was double tracked on January 15, 1997. Before it was double-tracked, it had one island platform with two tracks. Additionally, there is a siding line for maintenance vehicles on the Fukuoka side of the station (there is an Inuzuka work area). The station is unattended.

== Platforms ==
| 1 | ■ Tenjin Ōmuta Line | for Nishitetsu Yanagawa and Ōmuta |
| 2 | ■ Tenjin Ōmuta Line | for Daizenji, Nishitetsu Kurume, Nishitetsu Futsukaichi and Fukuoka |

== History ==
The station opened on 1 October 1937.

== Passenger statistics ==
In fiscal 2022, the station was used by 992 passengers daily.

== Surrounding area ==
- Mizuma Library
- Yasumoto Hospital
- Mizuma General Gymnasium
- Inutsuka Elementary School

== See also ==
- List of railway stations in Japan
