= Ōkawa, Fukuoka =

Ōkawa 大川市
- City
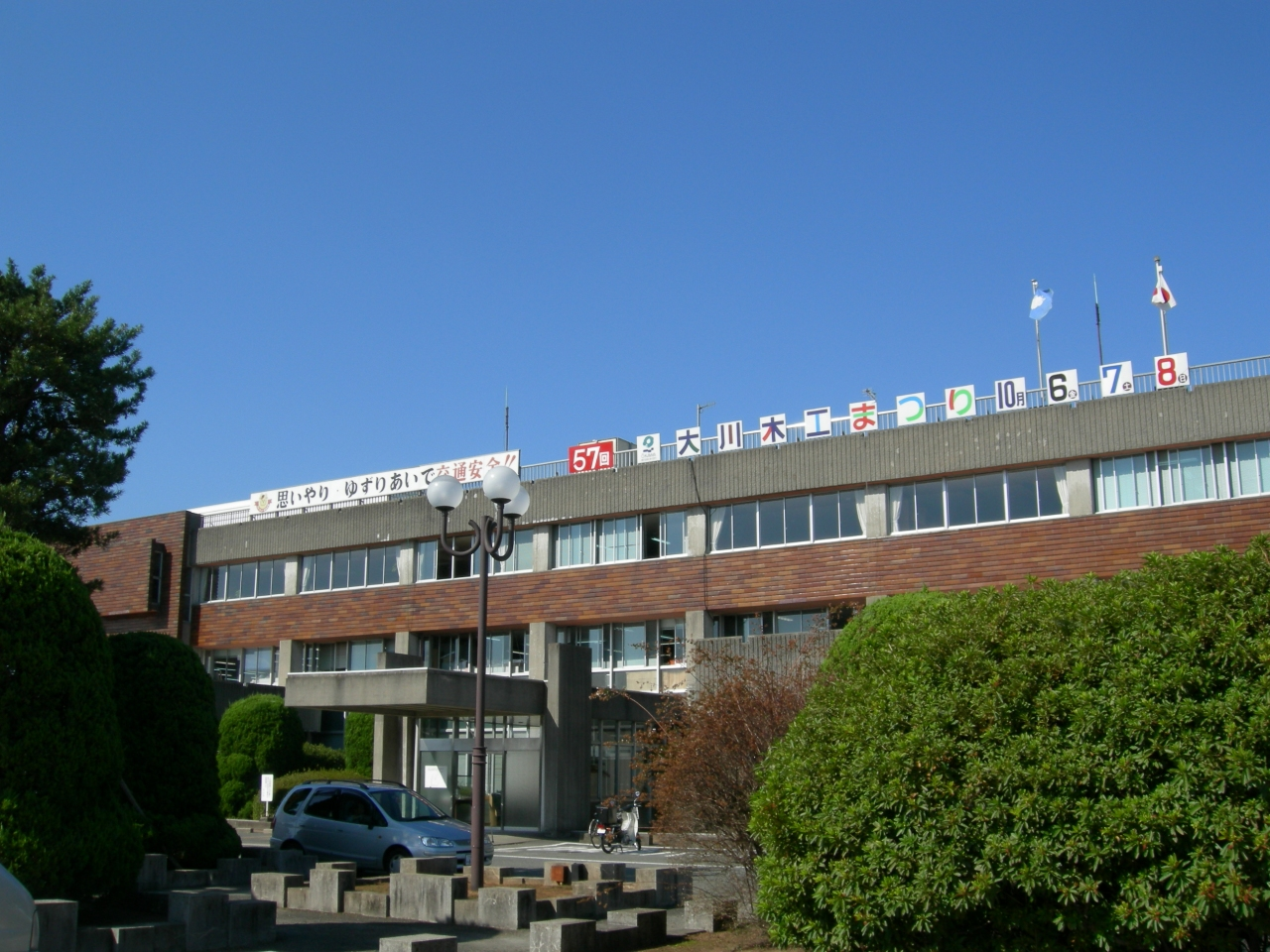
- Ōkawa City Hall

- Flag Seal
- Location of Ōkawa in Fukuoka Prefecture

- Location in Japan
- Coordinates: 33°12′24″N 130°23′02″E
- Country: Japan
- Region: Kyushu
- Prefecture: Fukuoka

Government
  - Mayor: Yoshiyuki Eto (since October 2024)

Area
  - Total: 33.62 km^{2} (12.98 sq mi)

Population (January 31, 2024)
  - Total: 31,605
  - Density: 940.1/km^{2} (2,435/sq mi)
- Time zone: UTC+09:00 (JST)
- City hall address: 256-1 Sakami, Ōkawa-shi, Fukuoka-ken 831-8601
- Website: Official website
- Symbols
- Flower: Canna lily
- Tree: Princess tree

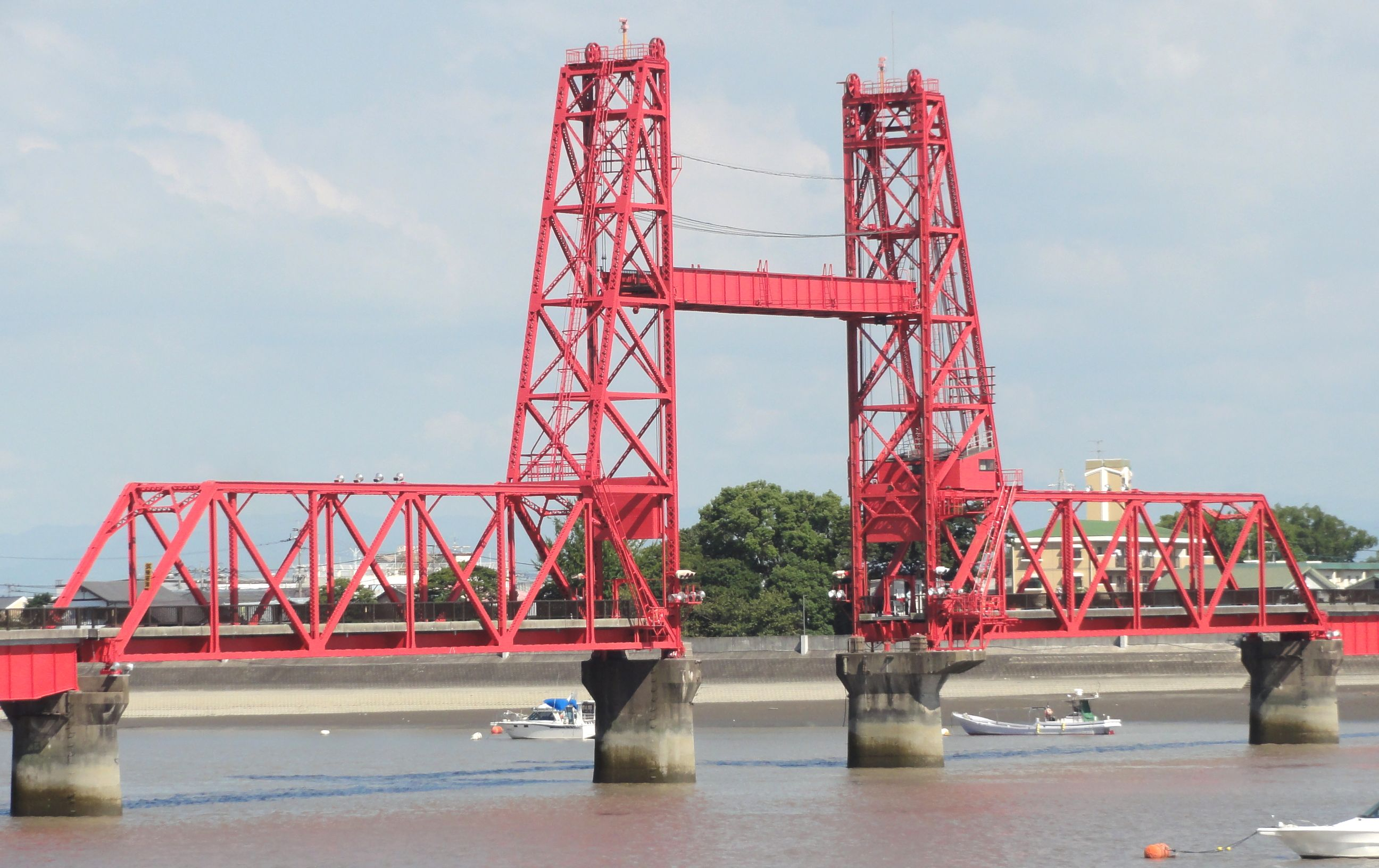
Chikugo River Lift Bridge

Ōkawa (大川市, Ōkawa-shi; Japanese pronunciation: [ó̞ò̞.kä̀.β̞ä̀, ò̞ó̞.kä́.β̞ä́.ɕì, ó̞ó̞.kä́.β̞ä́-]) is a city located in Fukuoka Prefecture, Japan. As of 1 February 2024, the city had an estimated population of 31,605 in 13984 households, and a population density of 940 persons per km². The total area of the city is 33.62 km^{2} (12.98 sq mi).

== Geography ==
Ōkawa is located in southern Fukuoka Prefecture next to the border with Saga Prefecture. The Chikugo River flows from northeast to southwest through the city, which is relatively flat. At the centre of Ōkawa, the Hanamune River flows into the Chikugo River as a tributary.

=== Neighboring municipalities ===
Fukuoka Prefecture

- Kurume
- Ōki
- Yanagawa

Saga Prefecture

- Kanzaki
- Saga

=== Climate ===
Ōkawa has a humid subtropical climate (Köppen Cfa) characterized by warm summers and cool winters with light to no snowfall. The average annual temperature in Ōkawa is 16.3 °C. The average annual rainfall is 1946 mm with September as the wettest month. The temperatures are highest on average in August, at around 27.1 °C, and lowest in January, at around 6.0 °C.

=== Demographics ===
Per Japanese census data, the population of Ōkawa is as shown below

Historical population
Year	Pop.	±%
1940	38,249	—
1950	46,345	+21.2%
1960	50,351	+8.6%
1970	51,637	+2.6%
1980	49,537	−4.1%
1990	45,704	−7.7%
2000	41,338	−9.6%
2010	37,465	−9.4%
2020	32,988	−11.9%

== History ==
The area of Ōkawa was part of ancient Chikugo Province. During the Edo Period the area was divided between of Kurume Domain and Yanagawa Domain. After the Meiji restoration, the town of Ōkawa was established on May 1, 1889 with the creation of the modern municipalities system. It was the location of a dike constructed by Dutch engineer Johannis de Rijke in 1890. It annexed the neighboring villages of Kawaguchi, Onojima, Taguchi, Mimata, and Kimuro on April 1, 1955 and was raised to city status.

== Government ==
Ōkawa has a mayor-council form of government with a directly elected mayor and a unicameral city council of 15 members. Ōkawa, together with the town of Ōki, contributes one member to the Fukuoka Prefectural Assembly. In terms of national politics, the city is part of the Fukuoka 6th district of the lower house of the Diet of Japan.

== Economy ==
Ōkawa is noted for its high concentration of furniture-related woodworking manufacturers, which began in the late Muromachi period.

== Education ==
Ōkawa has eight public elementary schools and two public junior high schools operated by the city government and one public high school operated by the Fukuoka Prefectural Board of Education. There is also one private high school. The International University of Health and Welfare has a campus in Ōkawa.

== Transportation ==
=== Railways ===
Ōkawa has not had any passenger railway service since the discontinuation of the JNR Saga Line in 1987. The nearest train stations are Nishitetsu Yanagawa Station on the Nishitetsu Tenjin Ōmuta Line in Yanagawa City in the center and southern part of the city, Hatchōmuta Station in Ōki Town and Kamachi Station in Yanagawa in the eastern part of the city, and Daizenji Station in Kurume in the northern part of the city .

=== Highways ===
- National Route 208
- National Route 385
- National Route 442
- National Route 443

== Sister cities ==
- Pordenone, Italy

== Notable residents of Ōkawa ==
- Takanori Jinnai, actor, movie director
- Masao Koga, composer
- Iwao Yamazaki, politician and cabinet minister
- Tatsunosuke Yamazaki, politician and cabinet minister in pre-war Japan

== Notable works that have featured this location ==
- Nodame Cantabile - The heroine of this work is from this municipality.
- Memories of Matsuko
