= Ōmizo Station =

Railway station in Ōki, Fukuoka Prefecture, Japan

Ōmizo Station 大溝駅
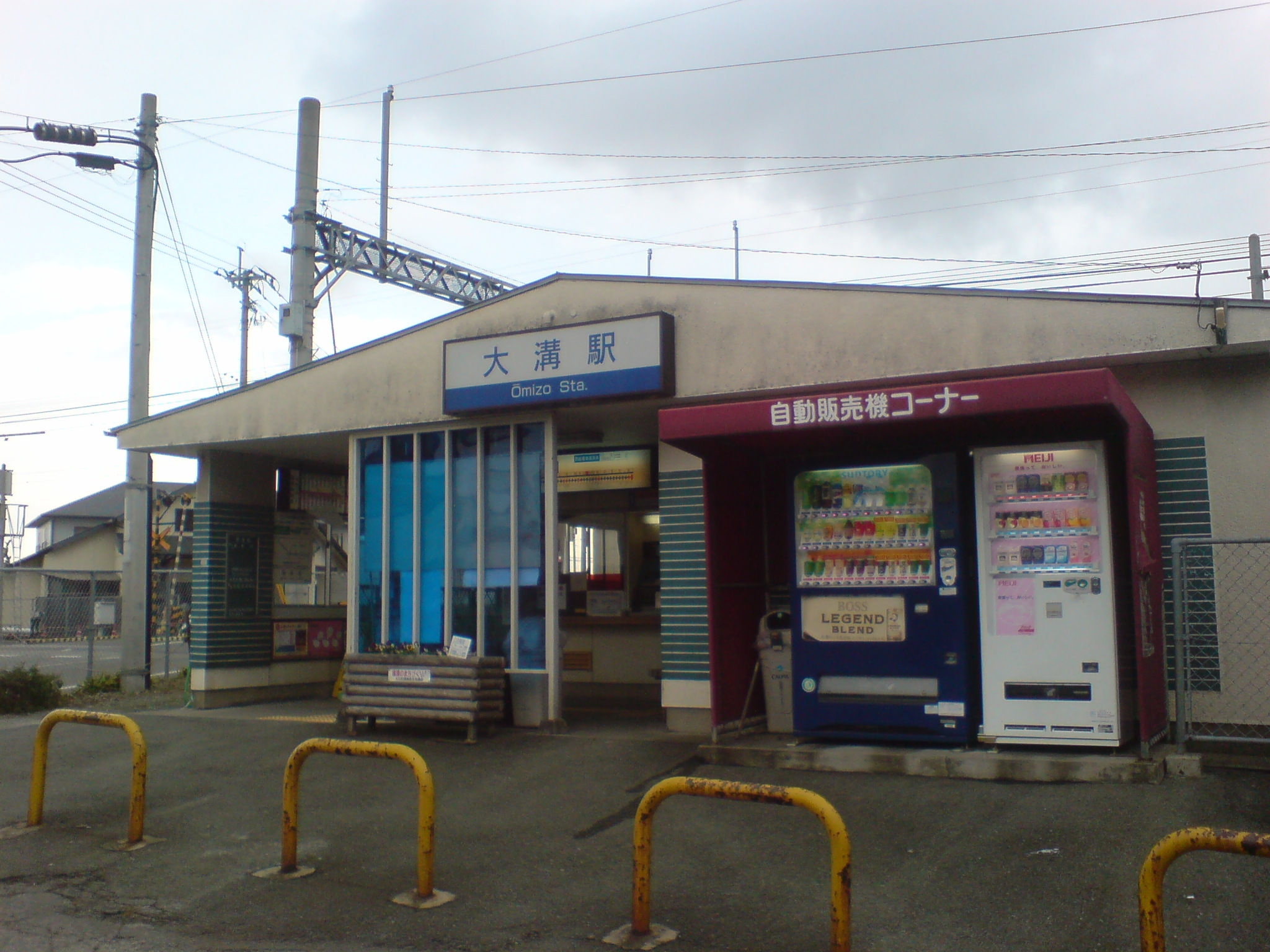
- Ōmizo Station building

General information
- Location: Ozumi, Ōki-cho, Mizuma-gun, Fukuoka-ken 830-0403; Japan
- Coordinates: 33°13′37.28″N 130°26′59.25″E
- Operator: Nishi-Nippon Railroad
- Line: ■ Tenjin Ōmuta Line
- Distance: 50.6 km from Nishitetsu Fukuoka (Tenjin)
- Platforms: 1 island platform
- Connections

Construction
- Structure type: At-grade

Other information
- Status: Unstaffed
- Station code: T35
- Website: Official website

History
- Opened: 1 October 1937

Passengers
- 2015: 1,00 daily

Services
| Preceding station | Nishitetsu | Following station |
|---|---|---|
| Inuzuka towards Nishitetsu Fukuoka (Tenjin) | Tenjin Ōmuta Line Local | Hatchōmuta towards Ōmuta |
Location
- Location within Fukuoka Prefecture Location within Japan

Ōmizo Station (大溝駅, Ōmizo-eki) is a passenger railway station located in the town of Ōki, Mizuma District, Fukuoka, Japan. It is operated by the private transportation company Nishi-Nippon Railroad (NNR), and has station number T35.

== Lines ==
The station is served by the Nishitetsu Tenjin Ōmuta Line and is 50.6 kilometers from the starting point of the line at Nishitetsu Fukuoka (Tenjin) Station.

== Station layout ==
The station consists of one island platform connected to the station building by a level crossing. The station is unattended.

== Platforms ==
| 1 | ■ Tenjin Ōmuta Line | for Nishitetsu Yanagawa and Ōmuta |
| 2 | ■ Tenjin Ōmuta Line | for Daizenji, Nishitetsu Kurume, Nishitetsu Futsukaichi and Fukuoka |

== History ==
The station opened on 1 October 1937.

== Passenger statistics ==
In fiscal 2022, the station was used by 1000 passengers daily.

== Surrounding area ==
- Mishima Shrine
- Ōmizo Post Office
- Ōmizo Elementary School

== See also ==
- List of railway stations in Japan
