= Mikunigaoka Station =

Mikunigaoka Station may refer to:

- Mikunigaoka Station (Osaka) (三国ヶ丘駅), a train station in Sakai, Osaka, Japan
- Mikunigaoka Station (Fukuoka) (三国が丘駅), a train station in Ogōri, Fukuoka, Japan
