= Okubo =

Ōkubo (大久保), also Okubo, Ookubo and Ohkubo, is a Japanese surname. Notable people with the surname include:

- Ōkubo clan
  - Ōkubo Tadayo (1532–1594), Japanese daimyō of the Sengoku period
  - Ōkubo Tadasuke (1537–1613), Japanese daimyō of the Sengoku and Edo periods
  - Ōkubo Nagayasu (1545–1613), Japanese samurai of the Edo period
  - Ōkubo Tadachika (1553–1628), Japanese daimyō of the Sengoku and Edo periods
  - Ōkubo Tadataka (1560–1639), Japanese samurai of the Sengoku and Edo periods
  - Ōkubo Tadazane (1778–1837), Japanese daimyō of the late Edo period
  - Ōkubo Toshimichi (1830–1878), Japanese samurai and later leader of the Meiji restoration

Contemporary

- Atsushi Ōkubo, Japanese manga author
- Benji Okubo, American artist
- Hiroshi Okubo, Japanese video game music composer
- James K. Okubo, American Medal of Honor recipient
- Ōkubo Haruno, Japanese general
- Hideo Ohkubo, Japanese businessman
- Jin Okubo (大久保 陣, born 1988), Japanese cyclist
- Katsutoshi Okubo (大久保 勝利, born 1943), Japanese Nordic combined skier
- Kayoko Okubo, Japanese comedian
- Kathleen Okubo, Filipino journalist and activist
- Kiyoshi Ōkubo, Japanese serial killer
- Mariko Okubo, Japanese actress
- Miné Okubo, American artist
- Tsutomu Okubo, Japanese politician
- Susumu Ōkubo, who proposed the Gell-Mann–Okubo mass formula
- Yasuhiro Okubo (大久保 康裕, born 1961), Japanese sport wrestler
- Yukishige Okubo, Japanese politician
- Yuri Okubo (大久保 勇利, born 2000), Japanese snowboarder

Footballers

- Goshi Okubo, Japanese footballer
- Makoto Okubo, Japanese footballer
- Takuo Ōkubo, Japanese footballer
- Tetsuya Ōkubo, Japanese footballer
- Yoshito Ōkubo, Japanese footballer
- Yuki Okubo, Japanese footballer

== See also ==
- Ōkubo, Akita, which merged with Iidagawa to become Shōwa, Akita in 1942
- Okubo Institute of Technology
- Ōkubo Station (disambiguation), multiple train stations
