= Marumi (given name) =

- Gender: Female

Origin
- Origin: Japanese
- Meaning: Different meanings depending on the kanji used

Marumi (written: 円美, マル美, 寿恵 or まるみ in hiragana) is a feminine Japanese given name. Notable people with the name include:

- Marumi Ogawa (小川 まるみ; born 1981), Japanese television personality and gravure idol
- Marumi Shiraishi (白石 マル美; born 1962), Japanese actress
- Marumi Yamazaki (山崎 円美; born 1990), Japanese women's footballer
