= Kamachi Station =

Railway station in Yanagawa, Fukuoka Prefecture, Japan

Kamachi Station 蒲池駅
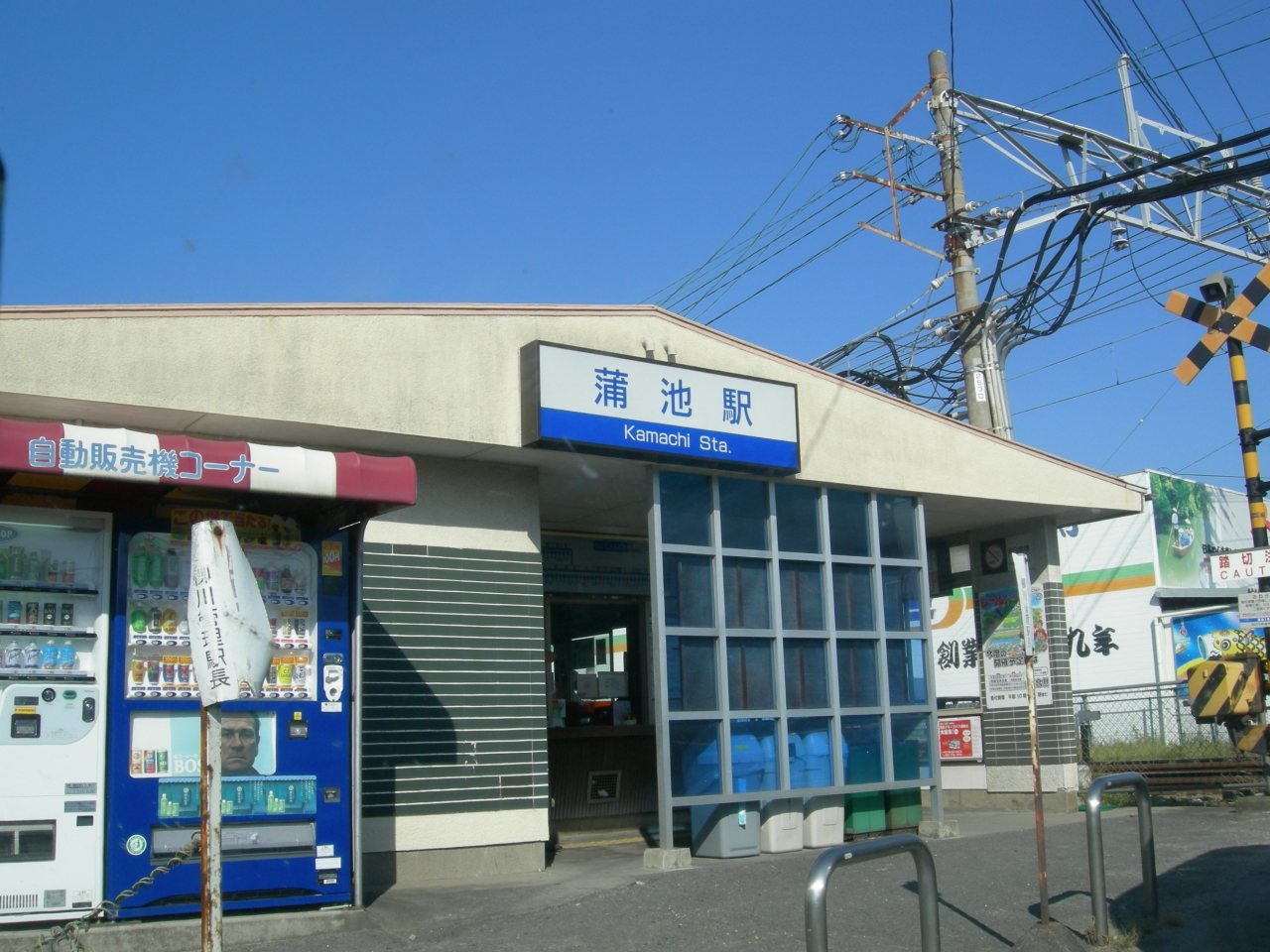
- Kamachi Station building

General information
- Location: Kamou, Yanagawa-shi, Fukuoka-ken 832-0001; Japan
- Coordinates: 33°11′21.81″N 130°25′20.38″E
- Operator: Nishi-Nippon Railroad
- Line: ■ Tenjin Ōmuta Line
- Distance: 55.5 km from Nishitetsu Fukuoka (Tenjin)
- Platforms: 2 side platforms
- Connections

Other information
- Status: Unstaffed
- Station code: T37
- Website: Official website

History
- Opened: 1 October 1937

Passengers
- FY2022: 411

Services
| Preceding station | Nishitetsu | Following station |
|---|---|---|
| Hatchōmuta towards Nishitetsu Fukuoka (Tenjin) | Tenjin Ōmuta Line Local | Yakabe towards Ōmuta |
Location
- Location within Fukuoka Prefecture Location within Japan

Kamachi Station (蒲池駅, Kamachi-eki) is a passenger railway station located in the city of Yanagawa, Fukuoka, Japan. It is operated by the private transportation company Nishi-Nippon Railroad (NNR), and has station number T37.

== Lines ==
The station is served by the Nishitetsu Tenjin Ōmuta Line and is 55.5 kilometers from the starting point of the line at Nishitetsu Fukuoka (Tenjin) Station.

== Station layout ==
The station consists of two opposed side platform connected by a level crossing.

== Platforms ==
| 1 | ■ Tenjin Ōmuta Line | for Nishitetsu Yanagawa and Ōmuta |
| 2 | ■ Tenjin Ōmuta Line | for Daizenji, Nishitetsu Kurume, Nishitetsu Futsukaichi and Fukuoka |

== History ==
The station opened on 1 October 1937. The company merged with the Kyushu Electric Tramway on 19 September 1942. The company changed its name to Nishi-Nippon Railway three days later, on 22 September 1942.

== Passenger statistics ==
In fiscal 2022, the station was used by 411 passengers daily.

== Surrounding area ==
- Kamachi Tateishi housing complex
- Kamachi Elementary School and Junior High School

== See also ==
- List of railway stations in Japan
