= 三沢駅 =

三沢駅 may refer to:

- Misawa Station
- Mitsusawa Station
