= USS Colahan =

Fletcher-class destroyer

Coordinates: 40.637°N 74.157°W

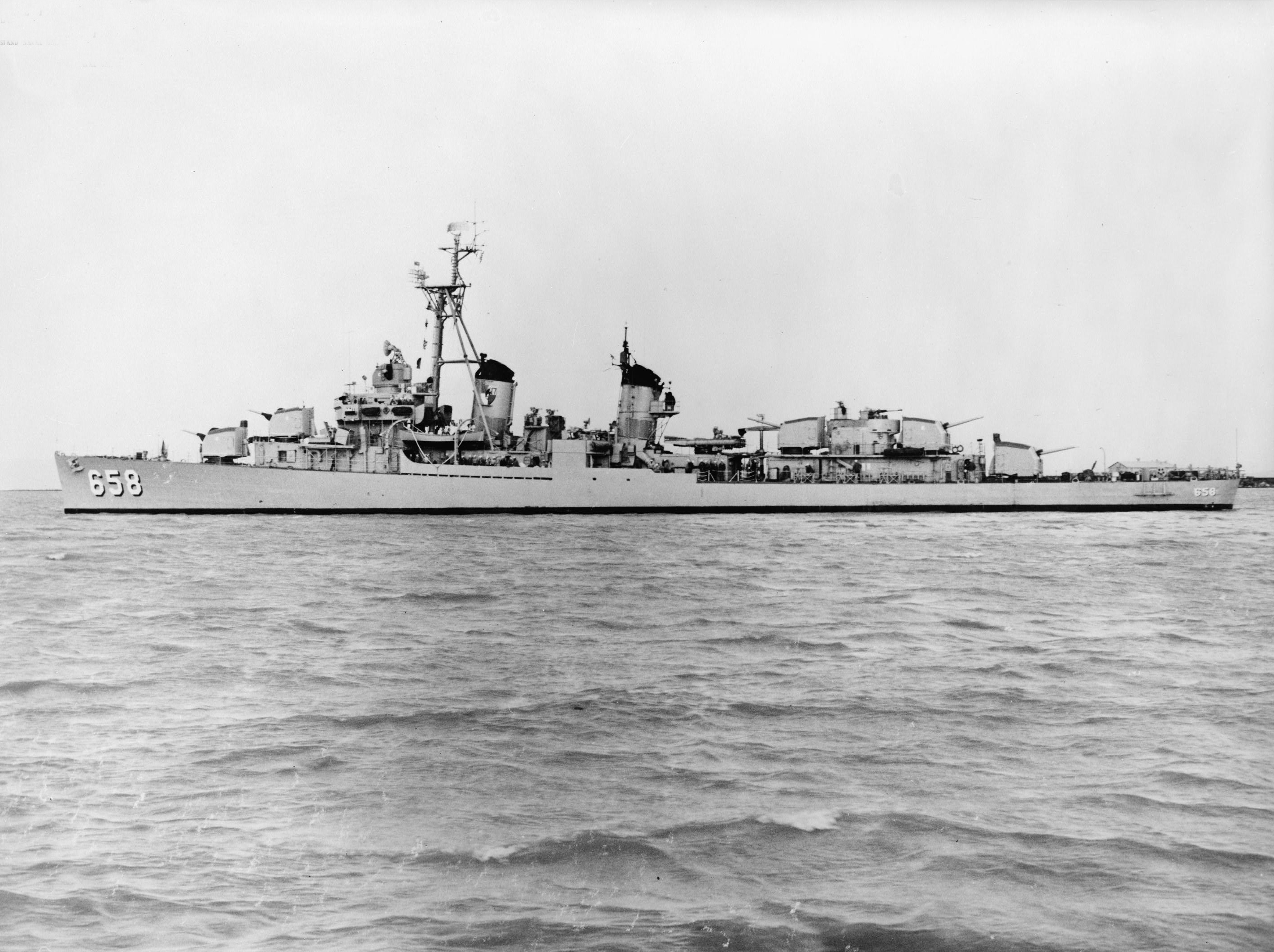

History

United States
- Namesake: Charles E. Colahan
- Builder: Bethlehem Mariners Harbor, Staten Island, New York
- Laid down: 24 October 1942
- Launched: 3 May 1943
- Commissioned: 23 August 1943
- Decommissioned: 1 August 1966
- Stricken: 1 August 1966
- Fate: Sunk as a target, 18 December 1966

General characteristics
- Class & type: Fletcher-class destroyer
- Displacement: 2,050 tons
- Length: 376 ft 6 in (114.7 m)
- Beam: 39 ft 8 in (12.1 m)
- Draft: 17 ft 9 in (5.4 m)
- Propulsion: 60,000 shp (45 MW); 2 propellers
- Speed: 35 knots (65 km/h; 40 mph)
- Range: 6500 nm at 15 kn (12,000 km at 28 km/h)
- Complement: 319
- Armament: 5 × 5-inch 38 caliber guns, 4 × 40 mm AA guns, 4 × 20 mm AA guns, 10 × 21 inch (533 mm) torpedo tubes, 6 × depth charge projectors, 2 × depth charge tracks

USS Colahan (DD-658) was a Fletcher-class destroyer of the United States Navy.

== Namesake ==
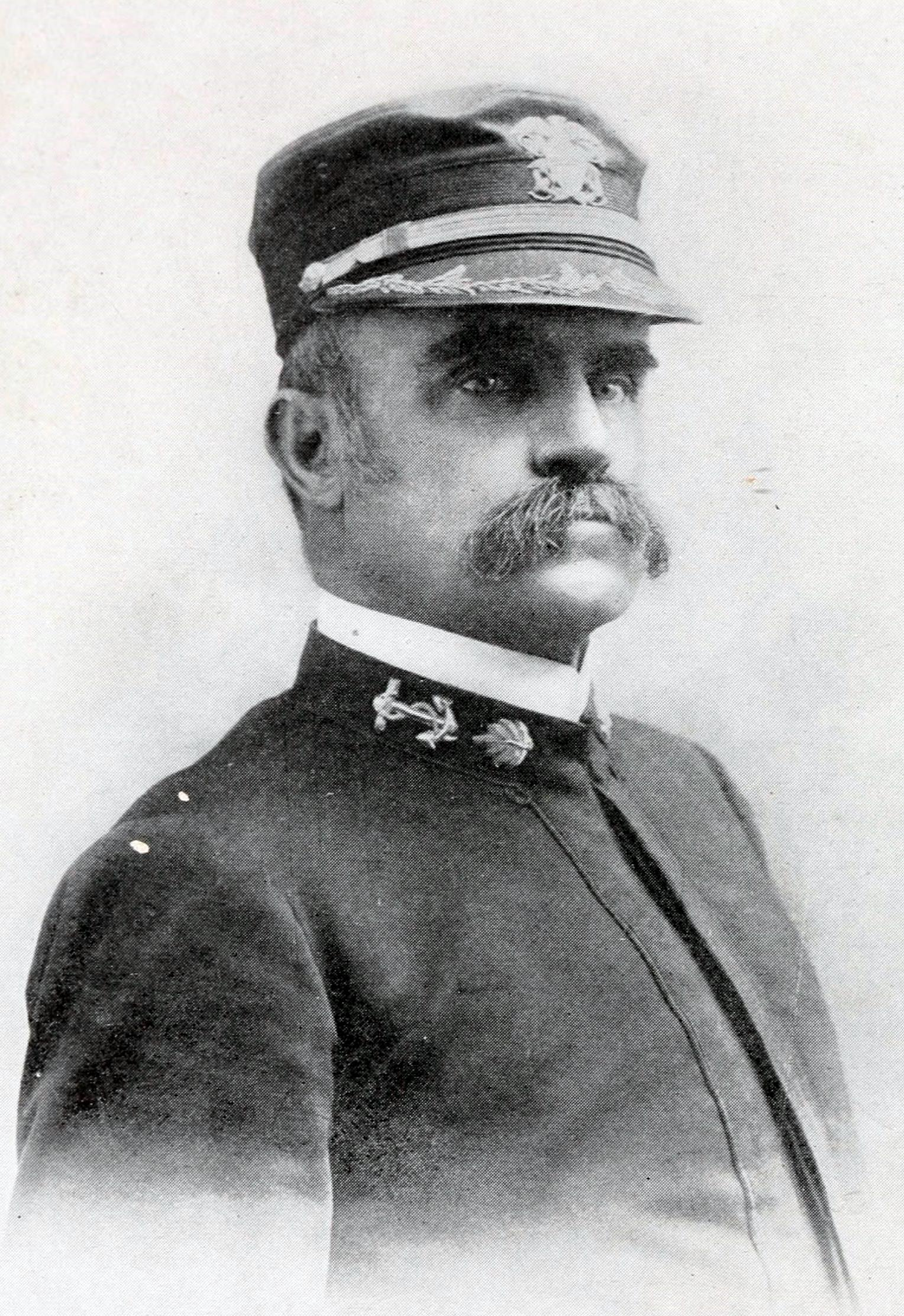
Charles E Colahan

Charles Ellwood Colahan was born on 25 October 1849 in Philadelphia, Pennsylvania. He graduated from the United States Naval Academy 4 June 1869. His career included command of USS Chesapeake, USS Indiana and USS Cleveland. On 1 July 1900, he was promoted from the rank of vice lieutenant-commander to commander in the U.S. Navy.

Following a lengthy illness, Colahan died at his home in Lambertville, New Jersey on 11 March 1904. His funeral was held in the United States Naval Academy chapel on 14 March. The full complement of officers and professors who were employed by the Naval Academy at the time attended the funeral and marched with the casket to the Navy cemetery where Colahan's remains were interred. Also accompanying the casket were the Naval Academy Band, a brigade of Naval Academy midshipmen, who were commanded by Commander W. F. Fullam, U.S.N., and a group of serving seamen. The pallbearers were: Honorary, Commander Charles J. Badger, U.S.N.; Commander William F. Halsey, U.S.N.; Lieutenant Commander W. C. P. Muir, U.S.N.; Professors Philip R. Alger and Nathaniel M. Terry, U.S.N.; and W. H. G. Bullard, U.S.N.

== Construction and commissioning ==
Colahan was launched on 3 May 1943 by Bethlehem Steel Co., Staten Island, N.Y., sponsored by Mrs. P. C. Hinkamp, adopted granddaughter of Commander Colahan; and commissioned on 23 August 1943.

== Service history ==
=== World War II ===
Colahan arrived at Pearl Harbor on 11 December 1943 to join the Pacific Fleet. She sortied with Task Force 52 (TF 52) for the invasion of the Marshall Islands on 19 January 1944, and screened Mississippi during her bombardment of Enubuj and Kwajalein Islands on 31 January.

After repairs and training at Pearl Harbor, Colahan sailed on 31 May 1944 to rejoin the 5th Fleet, operated on radar picket, shore bombardment and fire support duty during the bombardment, capture, and occupation of Guam from 12 July to 15 August and screened air strikes in support of the invasion of the southern Palaus from 29 August to 28 September. Colahan screened the Fast Carrier Task Force (then 3rd Fleet's TF 38, later 5th Fleet's TF 58) as it prepared for the Leyte assault with air strikes on the Nansei Shoto and Formosa from 10 to 14 October, then began strikes in the Philippines until 20 October, day of the landings. Carriers she guarded struck the retiring Japanese forces after the Battle of Surigao Strait phase of the massive Battle for Leyte Gulf of 24–26 October. Continued air operations in the Philippines claimed her services until she put into Ulithi for repairs late in December after riding out "Halsey's Typhoon".

From 30 December 1944 to 22 January 1945, Colahan resumed duty as advanced radar picket for the 3rd Fleet raids on Formosa, Luzon, Camranh Bay in Indo-China, Hong Kong, and Hainan Island which were coordinated with the Lingayen assault. On 10 February, she put to sea to serve on the scouting line as TF 58 swept close to Japan for air strikes in the Tokyo area. Colahan served on radar picket duty off Iwo Jima as it was invaded on 19 February, and for 5 days afterward, returning to Ulithi for repairs and replenishment.

Colahan operated with TF 58 in preparations for the Okinawa operation, from 14 March to 1 April, screening during air strikes on Kyūshū and Okinawa. Continuing carrier task force operations after the initial assault, she went to the aid of Hazelwood on 29 April, rescuing some 140 survivors of the kamikaze victim. After replenishing at San Pedro Bay, Leyte, Colahan rejoined TF 38 on 13 June for the last great series of air raids against the Japanese home islands. On 24 July 1945, she mistook the U.S. Navy submarine USS Toro (SS-422) for a Japanese picket boat while Toro was on the surface south of Shikoku performing lifeguard duty for Allied air strikes and opened gunfire at a range of 7,400 yards (6,800 m), straddling Toro with her first salvo. Toro crash-dived to a depth of 400 feet (122 m), sustaining no damage or casualties, and later reported that Colohan was still firing as Toro passed a depth of 150 feet (46 m).

Hostilities with Japan ended on 15 August 1945. Entering Sagami Wan on 27 August 1945, Colahan became harbor entrance control vessel for Tokyo Bay until 3 September. On 8 October, she aided the Japanese MV Kiri Marti, which had gone aground on Miyake Shima, and transferred the survivors to Okubo.

Clearing Tokyo Bay on 31 October 1945, Colahan returned to San Diego where she was placed out of commission in reserve on 14 June 1946 and assigned to the 12th Naval District for use in training United States Naval Reserve personnel.

=== 1950-1966 ===
Recommissioned on 16 December 1950, Colahan had training from her home port at San Diego until 20 August 1951, when she cleared San Francisco for service in the Korean War with the 7th Fleet. Conducting shore bombardment and fire support to aid forces ashore, she also had antisubmarine training off Okinawa before returning to the west coast on 10 March 1952. On 1 November 1952, she sailed again from San Diego to bombard Korean targets and screen carriers, as well as serve on the Taiwan Patrol and train off Okinawa. She returned to the west coast 1 June 1953, and in 1954–1957, returned to the Far East for service with the 7th Fleet. From 1958 to 1963, her operations have been along the west coast, training members of the Naval Reserve. In August 1961, she and her Naval Reservists were deployed to the active fleet as part of President Kennedy's response to the Berlin wall crisis. After several months of training, she was deployed to the Western Pacific on 2 February 1962. On 15 April 1962 she escorted the USS Princeton, LPH-5 to South Vietnam so it could deliver helicopters and advisors to Soc Trang. She returned from the WestPac cruise on 17 July 1962, resuming the training of Naval Reserve personnel through the end of 1963.

Colahan was decommissioned and stricken from the Naval Vessel Register on 1 August 1966. She was sunk as target off California on 18 December 1966.

As a sidenote, Colahan appears in the opening credits of the 1954 MGM film 'Men of the Fighting Lady' while underway alongside an aircraft carrier during high lining personnel between the 2 ships.

== Awards ==
Colahan received eight battle stars for World War II service, and five for Korean War service.
