= Mizuma Station =

Railway station in Kurume, Fukuoka Prefecture, Japan

Mizuma Station 三潴駅
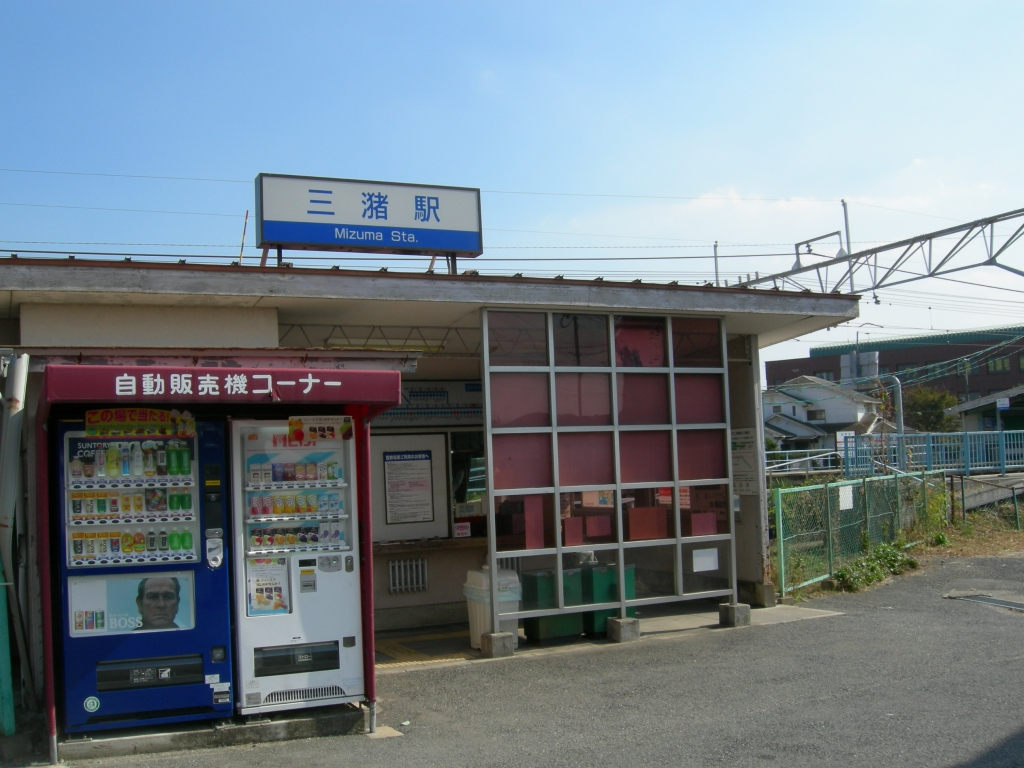
- Station Building

General information
- Location: Mizumamachi Tagawa, Kurume-shi, Fukuoka-ken 830-0102; Japan
- Coordinates: 33°15′24.29″N 130°28′10.44″E
- Operator: Nishi-Nippon Railroad
- Line: ■ Tenjin Ōmuta Line
- Distance: 46.9 km from Nishitetsu Fukuoka (Tenjin)
- Platforms: 2 side platforms
- Connections

Construction
- Structure type: At-grade

Other information
- Status: Unstaffed
- Station code: T33
- Website: Official website

History
- Opened: 1 October 1937

Passengers
- FY2022: 822

Services
Preceding station	Nishitetsu	Following station
Daizenji towards Nishitetsu Fukuoka (Tenjin)	Tenjin Ōmuta Line Local	Inuzuka towards Ōmuta
Location
- Location within Fukuoka Prefecture Location within Japan

Mizuma Station (三潴駅, Mizuma-eki) is a passenger railway station located in the city of Kurume, Fukuoka, Japan. It is operated by the private transportation company Nishi-Nippon Railroad (NNR), and has station number T33.

== Lines ==
The station is served by the Nishitetsu Tenjin Ōmuta Line and is 46.9 kilometers from the starting point of the line at Nishitetsu Fukuoka (Tenjin) Station.

== Station layout ==
The station consists of a two opposed side platform connected to the station building by a level crossing. The station is unattended.

== Platforms ==
1	■ Tenjin Ōmuta Line	for Nishitetsu Yanagawa and Ōmuta
2	■ Tenjin Ōmuta Line	for Daizenji, Nishitetsu Kurume, Nishitetsu Futsukaichi and Fukuoka

== History ==
The station opened on 1 October 1937.

== Passenger statistics ==
In fiscal 2022, the station was used by 822 passengers daily.

== Surrounding area ==
- Former Mizuma Town Hall
- Kurume City Mizuma Library
- Kurume City Mizuma Junior High School

== See also ==
- List of railway stations in Japan
