= Mikunigaoka Station (Fukuoka) =

Railway station in Ogōri, Fukuoka Prefecture, Japan

Mikunigaoka Station 三国が丘駅
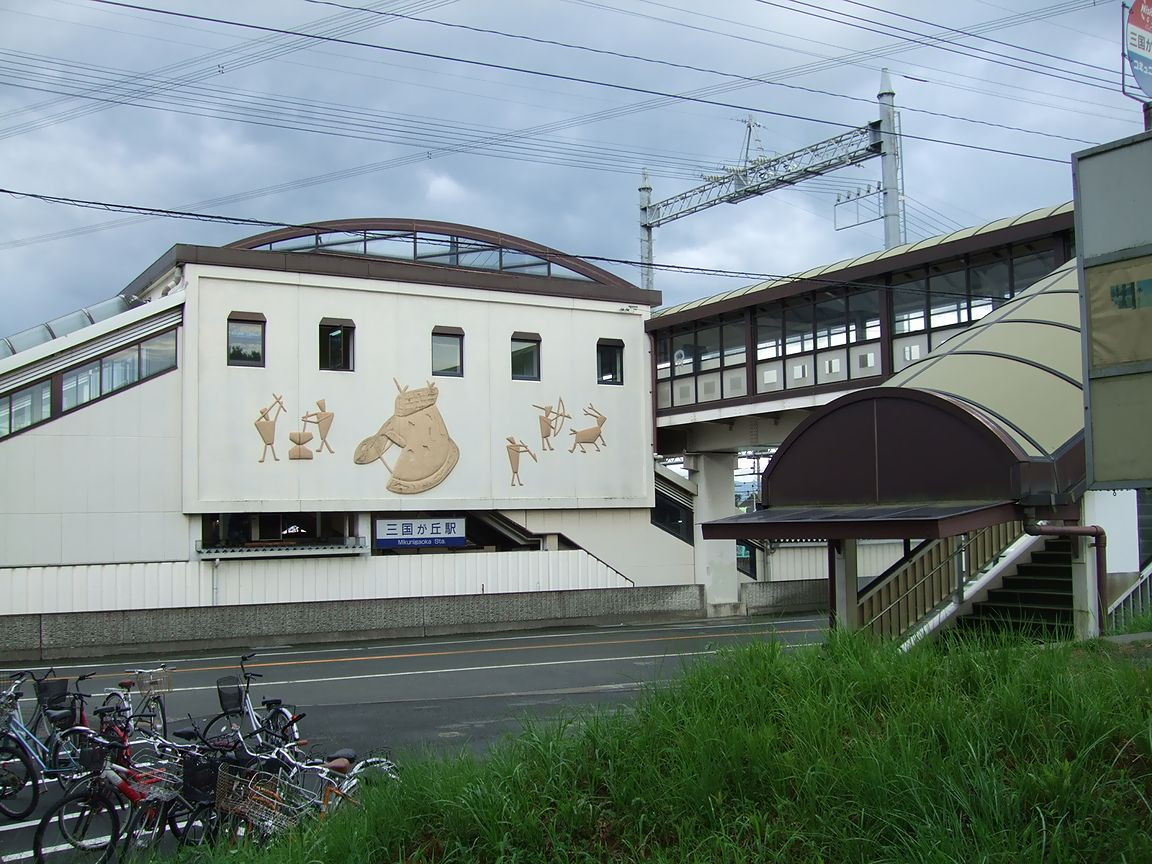
- Mikunigaoka Station building

General information
- Location: Mitsusawa, Ogōri-shi, Fukuoka-ken838-0106; Japan
- Coordinates: 33°26′11.76″N 130°33′47.35″E
- Operator: Nishi-Nippon Railroad
- Line: ■ Tenjin Ōmuta Line
- Distance: 24.1 km from Nishitetsu Fukuoka (Tenjin)
- Platforms: 2 side platforms
- Connections

Construction
- Structure type: At-grade

Other information
- Status: Staffed
- Station code: T19
- Website: Official website

History
- Opened: 25 March 1992

Passengers
- FY2022: 5454

Services
Preceding station	Nishitetsu	Following station
Tsuko towards Nishitetsu Fukuoka (Tenjin)	Tenjin Ōmuta Line Local	Mitsusawa towards Ōmuta
Chikushi towards Nishitetsu Fukuoka (Tenjin)	Tenjin Ōmuta Line Express	Nishitetsu Ogōri towards Ōmuta
Location
- Location within Fukuoka Prefecture Location within Japan

Mikunigaoka Station (三国が丘駅, Mikunigaoka-eki) is a passenger railway station located in the city of Ogōri, Fukuoka, Japan. It is operated by the private transportation company Nishi-Nippon Railroad (NNR), and has station number T19.

== Lines ==
The station is served by the Nishitetsu Tenjin Ōmuta Line and is 24.1 kilometers from the starting point of the line at Nishitetsu Fukuoka (Tenjin) Station.

== Station layout ==
The station consists of a two opposed ground-level side platforms connected by an elevated station building. The station is staffed.

== Platforms ==
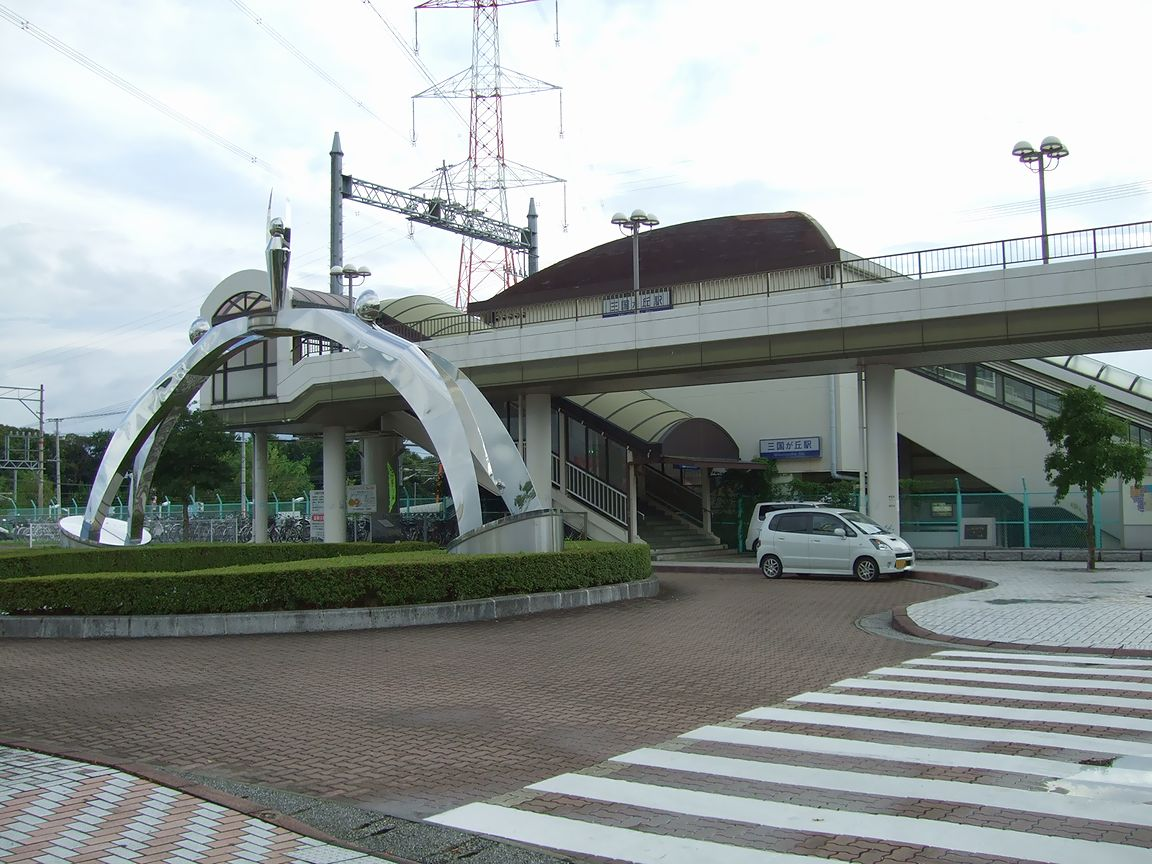
Mikunigaoka station entrance

1	■ Tenjin Ōmuta Line	for Kurume, Yanagawa and Ōmuta
2	■ Tenjin Ōmuta Line	for Futsukaichi and Fukuoka

== History ==
The station opened on 25 March 1992.

== Passenger statistics ==
In fiscal 2022, the station was used by 5454 passengers daily.

== Surrounding area ==
- Ogori City Mikuni Junior High School - 10 minutes walk towards Misuzugaoka on the west side of the station.
- Ogori Municipal Nozomigaoka Elementary School - 20 minutes walk towards the west side of the station towards Nozomigaoka.
- Aso Gakuen Elementary School - West side of the station. 5 minutes by car towards Kisumigaoka. private.
- Buried Cultural Properties Research Center - West side of the station, 7 minutes walk towards Misuzugaoka. There are many ancient tombs in the vicinity that are being investigated. Tours are also possible.
- Kyushu Historical Museum

== See also ==
- List of railway stations in Japan
