= Hatchōmuta Station =

Railway station in Ōki, Fukuoka Prefecture, Japan

Hatchōmuta Station 八丁牟田駅
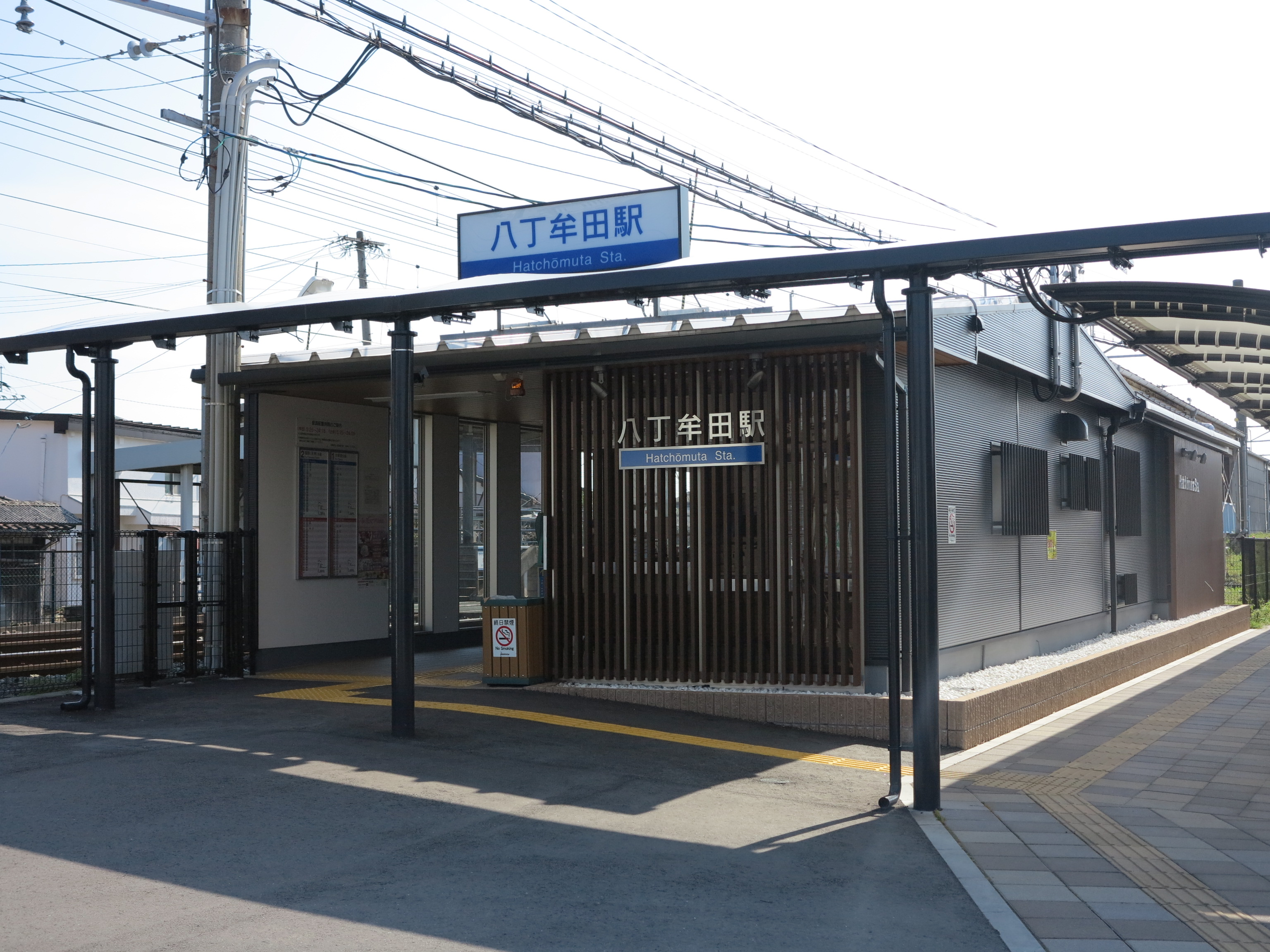
- Hatchōmuta Station building

General information
- Location: Hatchōmuta, Ōki-cho, Mizuma-gun, Fukuoka-ken 830-0416; Japan
- Coordinates: 33°12′33.62″N 130°26′16.08″E
- Operator: Nishi-Nippon Railroad
- Line: ■ Tenjin Ōmuta Line
- Distance: 52.9 km from Nishitetsu Fukuoka (Tenjin)
- Platforms: 2 side platform

Construction
- Structure type: At-grade

Other information
- Status: Unstaffed
- Station code: T36
- Website: Official website

History
- Opened: 1 October 1937

Passengers
- FY2020: 1187 daily

Services
Preceding station	Nishitetsu	Following station
Ōmizo towards Nishitetsu Fukuoka (Tenjin)	Tenjin Ōmuta Line Local	Kamachi towards Ōmuta
Location
- Location within Fukuoka Prefecture Location within Japan

Hatchōmuta Station (八丁牟田駅, Hatchōmuta-eki) is a passenger railway station located in the town of Ōki, Mizuma District, Fukuoka, Japan. It is operated by the private transportation company Nishi-Nippon Railroad (NNR), and has station number T36.

== Lines ==
The station is served by the Nishitetsu Tenjin Ōmuta Line and is 52.9 kilometers from the starting point of the line at Nishitetsu Fukuoka (Tenjin) Station.

== Station layout ==
The station consists of two opposed side platform connected to the station building by a level crossing. The station is unattended.

== Platforms ==
1	■ Tenjin Ōmuta Line	for Nishitetsu Yanagawa and Ōmuta
2	■ Tenjin Ōmuta Line	for Nishitetsu Kurume and Fukuoka

== History ==
The station opened on 1 October 1937.

== Passenger statistics ==
In fiscal 2022, the station was used by 1187 passengers daily.

== Surrounding area ==
- Ōki Town Office
- Ōki Junior High School
- Ōki Town Kisaki Elementary School

== See also ==
- List of railway stations in Japan
