= Chikugo River Lift Bridge =

Chikugo River Lift Bridge 筑後川昇開橋
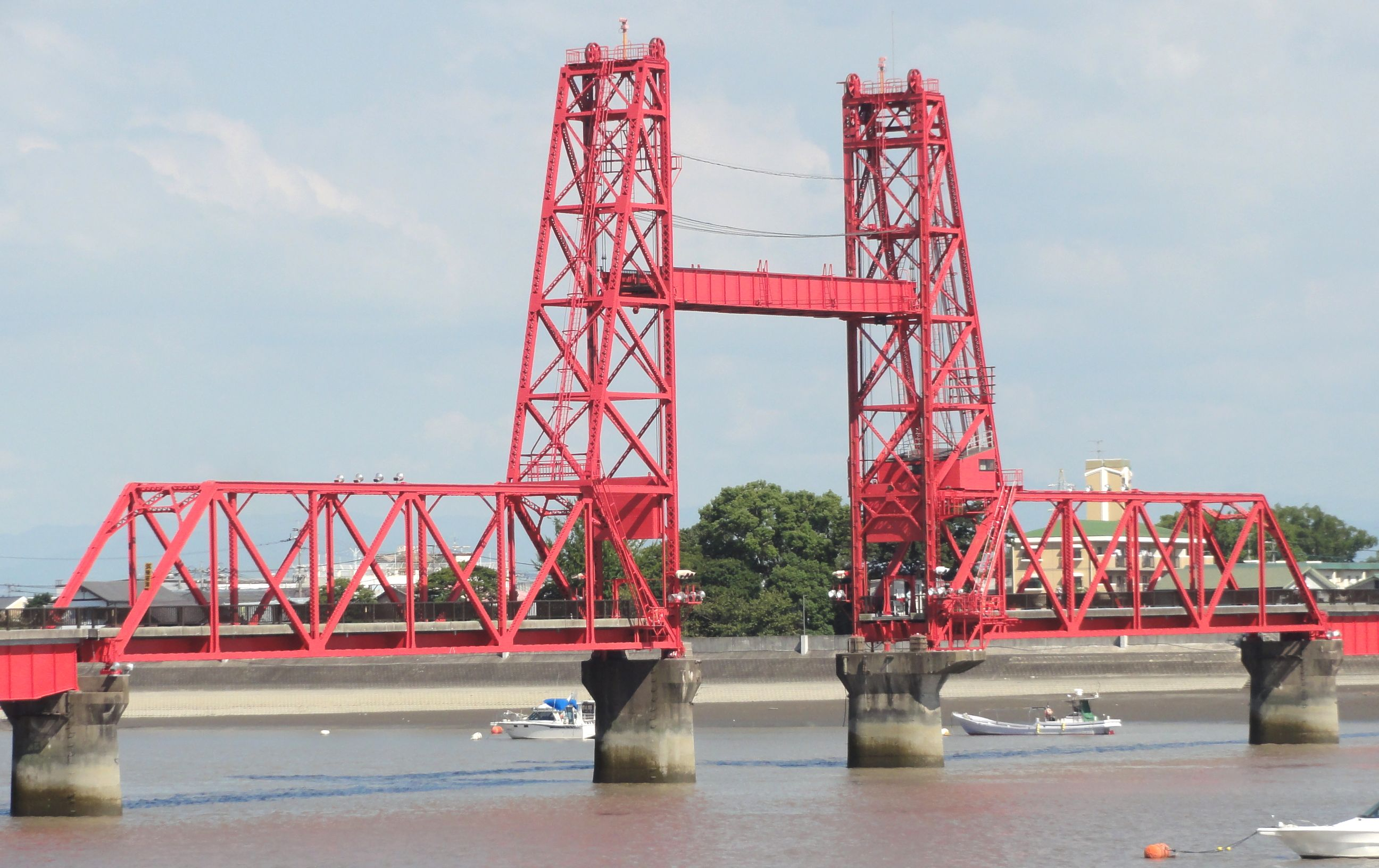
- Chikugo River Lift Bridge
- Coordinates: 33°12′54″N 130°21′43″E
- Carries: Rail traffic
- Crosses: Chikugo River
- Locale: Kyūshū, Japan
- Official name: Chikugo-gawa shōkaikyō
- Heritage status: Important Cultural Property

Characteristics
- Design: vertical-lift bridge
- Total length: 507.2 metres (1,664 ft)
- Height: 23 metres (75 ft)
- Longest span: 24.2 metres (79 ft)

History
- Construction end: 1935
- Closed: 1987, pedestrian traffic from 1996

Location
- Interactive map of Chikugo River Lift Bridge 筑後川昇開橋

The Chikugo River Lift Bridge (筑後川昇開橋, Chikugo-gawa shōkaikyō) is a vertical lift railway bridge across the Chikugo River in Kyūshū, Japan. It was completed in 1935. The bridge has a total length of 507.2 metres (1,664 ft), with a moveable span of 24.2 metres (79 ft) long and a vertical rise of 23 metres (75 ft). It links Ōkawa, Fukuoka with Saga, Saga, and used to be part of the Saga Railway Line. When that line ceased operation in 1987 the bridge was closed to traffic. In 1996 it was reopened for pedestrians in response to requests from the public.

A precision miniature model of the bridge, which describes its structure, was exhibited at the Exposition Internationale des Arts et Techniques dans la Vie Moderne (1937). Today this model is on display at the Railway Museum (Saitama).

The bridge was designated an Important Cultural Property in 2003, and in 2007 it was included in the Mechanical Engineering Heritage as item No. 23.

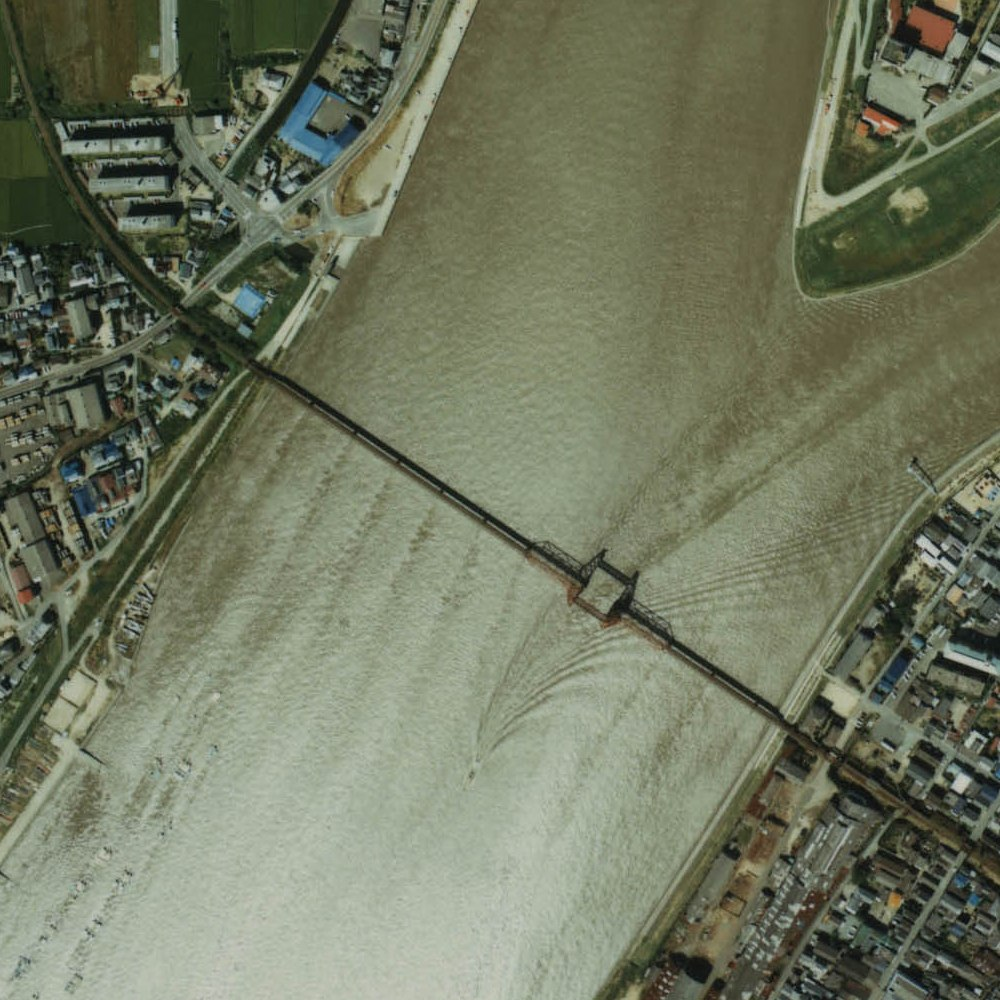
Aerial view of the bridge

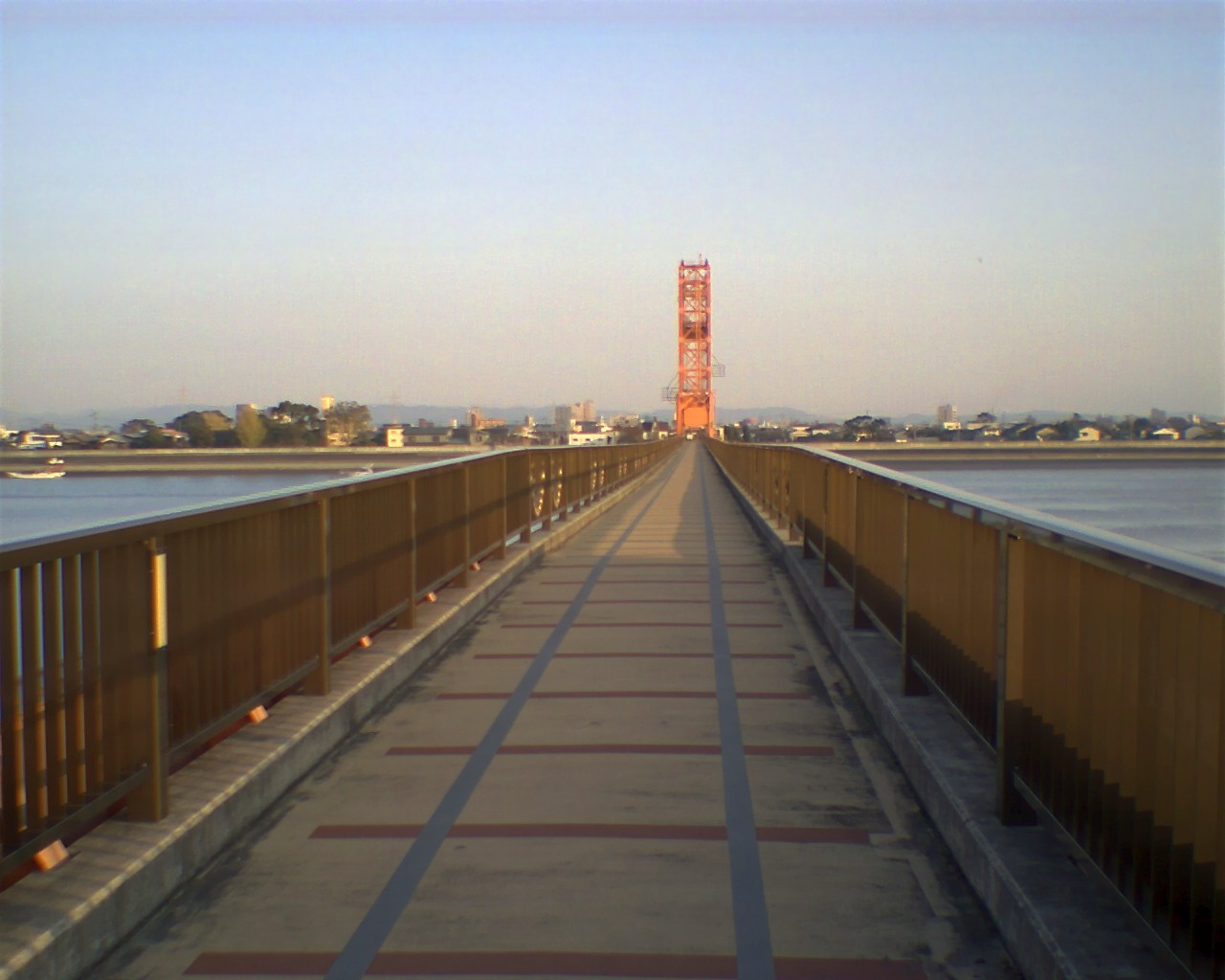
The bridge viewed from the Morodomi side
