= Mitsusawa Station =

Railway station in Ogōri, Fukuoka Prefecture, Japan

Mitsusawa Station 三沢駅
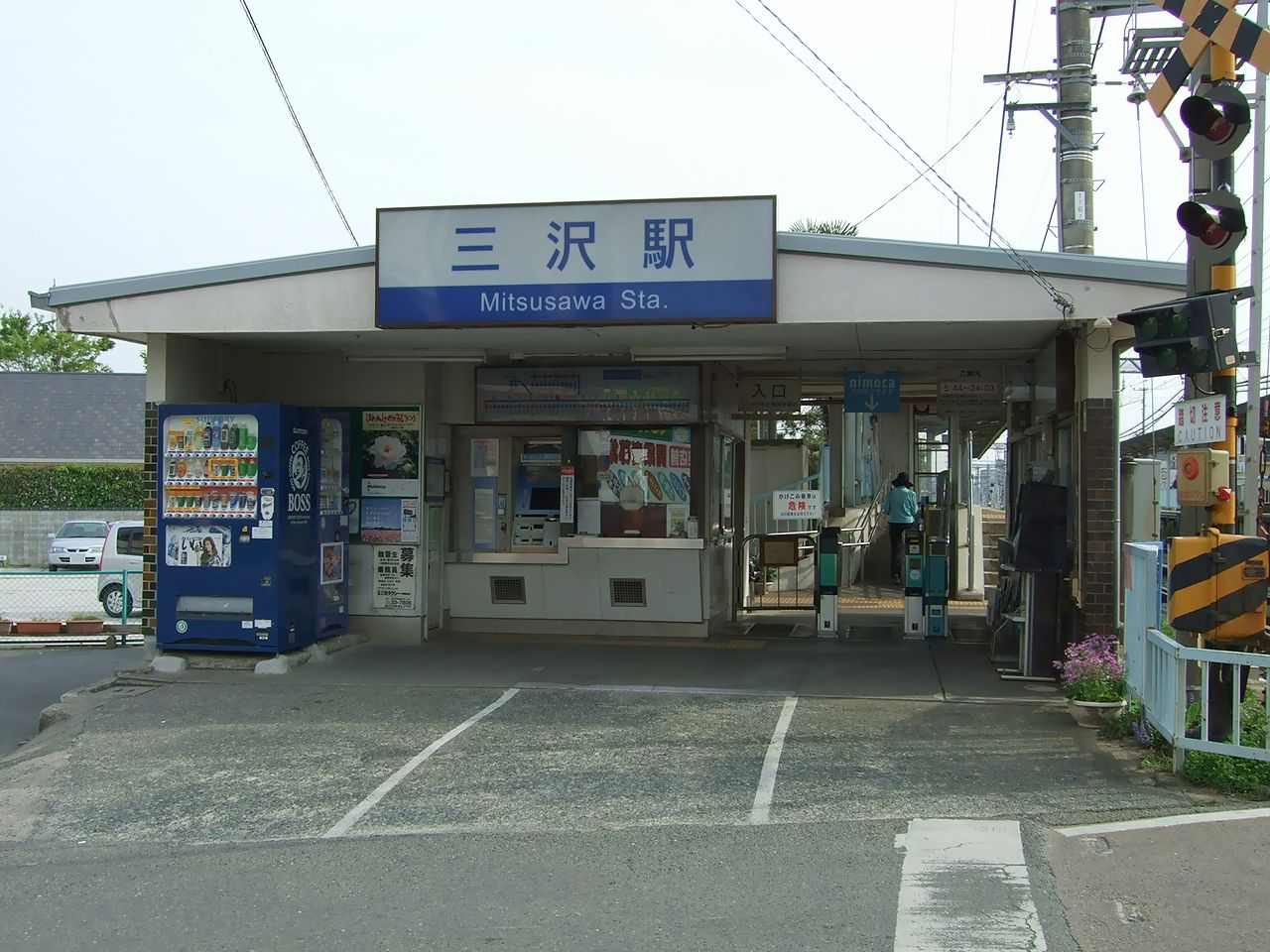
- Mitsusawa Station building

General information
- Location: Mitsusawa, Ogōri-shi, Fukuoka-ken 838-0106; Japan
- Coordinates: 33°25′24.81″N 130°33′37.89″E
- Operator: Nishi-Nippon Railroad
- Line: ■ Tenjin Ōmuta Line
- Distance: 35.6 km from Nishitetsu Fukuoka (Tenjin)
- Platforms: 2 side platform
- Connections

Construction
- Structure type: At-grade

Other information
- Status: Staffed
- Station code: T20
- Website: Official website

History
- Opened: 12 April 1924

Passengers
- FY2022: 1709

Services
Preceding station	Nishitetsu	Following station
Mikunigaoka towards Nishitetsu Fukuoka (Tenjin)	Tenjin Ōmuta Line Local	Ōho towards Ōmuta
Location
- Location within Fukuoka Prefecture Location within Japan

Mitsusawa Station (三沢駅, Mitsusawa-eki) is a passenger railway station located in the city of Ogōri, Fukuoka, Japan. It is operated by the private transportation company Nishi-Nippon Railroad (NNR), and has station number T20.

== Lines ==
The station is served by the Nishitetsu Tenjin Ōmuta Line and is 25.6 kilometers from the starting point of the line at Nishitetsu Fukuoka (Tenjin) Station.

== Station layout ==
The station consists of a two opposed ground-level side platforms connected to the station building by a level crossing. The station is staffed.

== Platforms ==
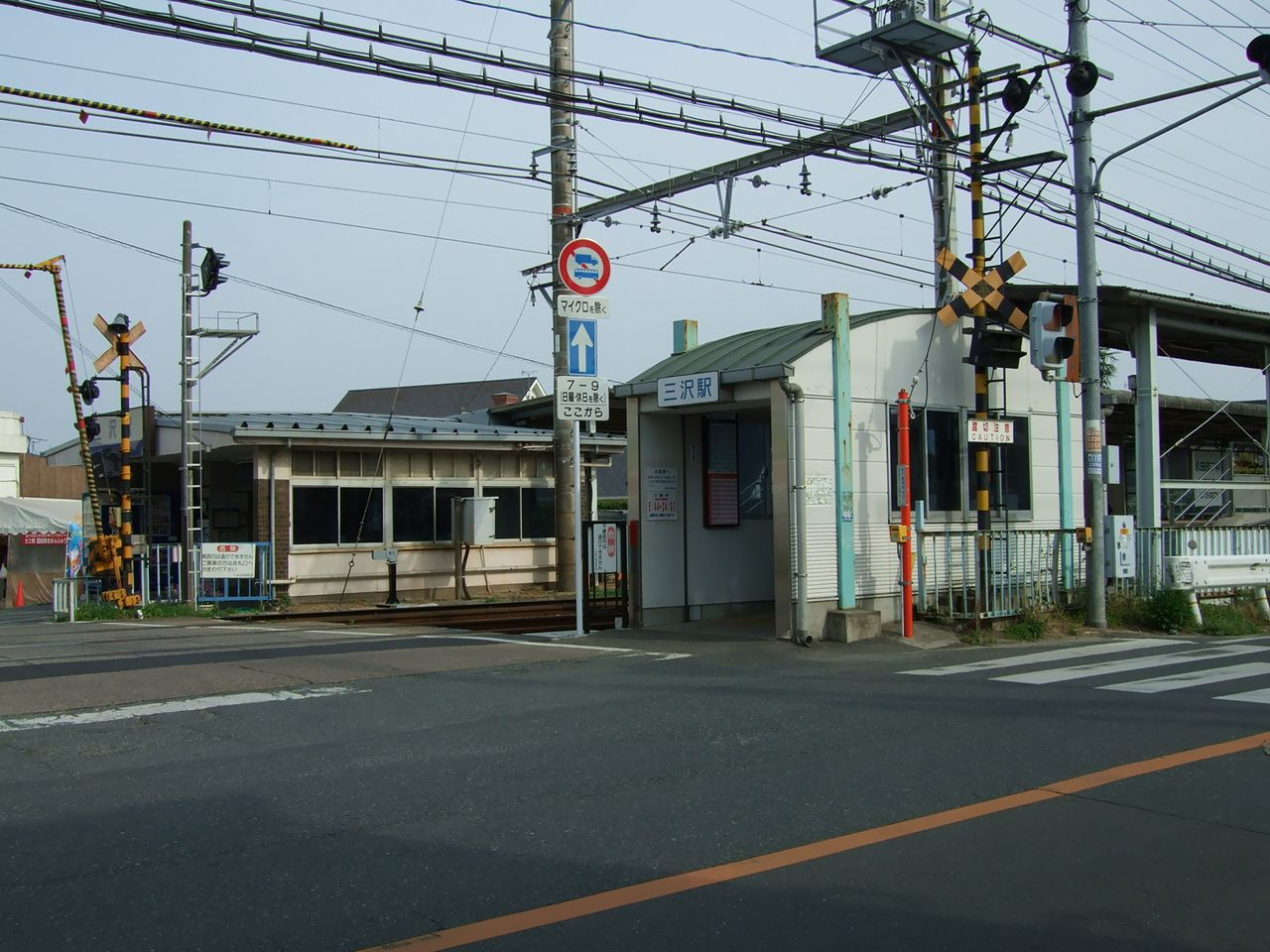
Mitsusawa station platform

1	■ Tenjin Ōmuta Line	for Kurume, Yanagawa and Ōmuta
2	■ Tenjin Ōmuta Line	for Futsukaichi and Fukuoka

== History ==
The station opened on 12 April 1924 as a station on the Kyushu Railway. The company merged with the Kyushu Electric Tramway on 19 September 1942. The company changed its name to Nishi-Nippon Railway three days later, on 22 September 1942.

== Passenger statistics ==
In fiscal 2022, the station was used by 1709 passengers daily.

== Surrounding area ==
- Fukuoka Prefectural Road 88
- Mikuni Elementary School

== See also ==
- List of railway stations in Japan
