= Okaya =

Okaya may refer to:

- Okaya & Co., Ltd., the oldest major Japanese trading company still in existence.
- Okaya, Nagano, a city in Nagano Prefecture, Japan
- Okaya Optical, the manufacturer of Lord cameras and Vista binoculars
