= Olympus C-770 Ultra Zoom =

The Olympus C-770 Ultra Zoom is a digital camera manufactured by Olympus. It was first announced with the name C-770 Movie during the 2004 Photo Marketing Association Annual Convention and Trade Show. A significant (though not exclusive) feature of the C-770 Ultra Zoom is its ability to record VGA MPEG-4 video at 30 frames/second. It features a 10X optical lens.
