= Osaka Eco Agricultural Products =

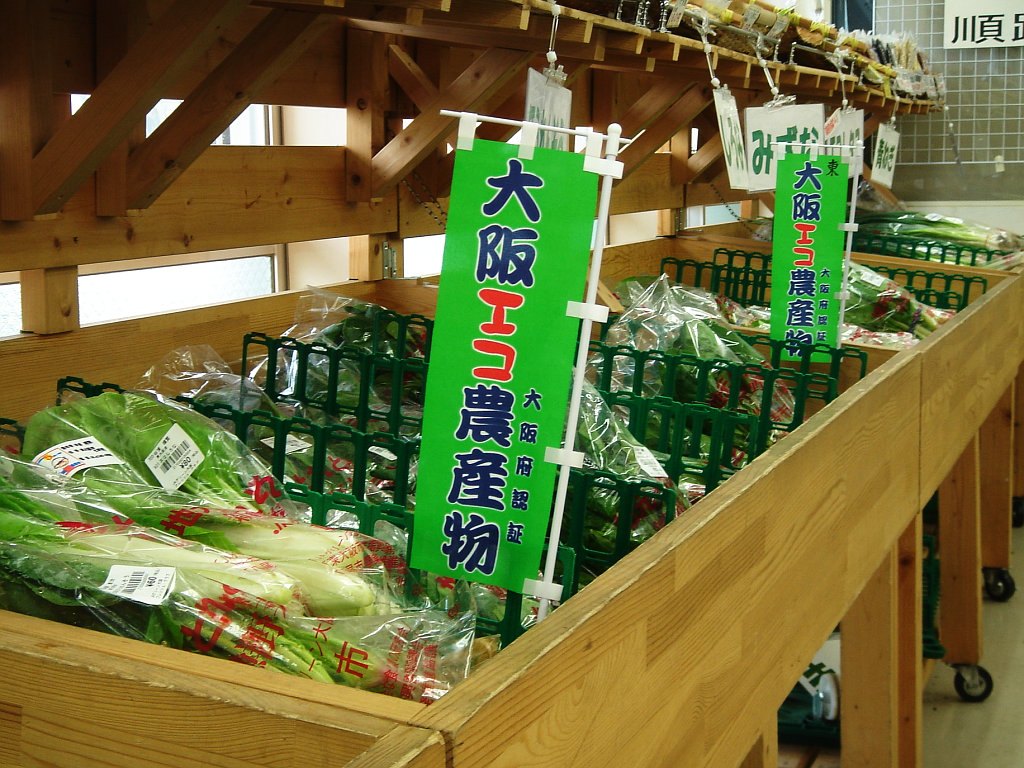
stall at Higashiōsaka City

Osaka Eco Agricultural Products is an agricultural production unit created within Osaka Prefecture, Japan, with the aim to reduce the use of pesticide and fertilizers. The target is to reach below average usage in Osaka area.

The resulting products do not qualify as organic food, because of the continuing use of pesticide and fertilizer.

Farmers must register with Osaka's prefecture government office and get permission to use this title in the agriculture market. Government specialists perform technical administration and inspection of each farmer. The main agricultural products applied to this title are rice, soybeans, vegetables, fruits and flowers.

Only products that have permission from the government can use the logo.

== Eco vegetable ==
Certified vegetables are called eco vegetables. In April 2009 a salad made with the eco vegetable, called Eco Salad, was sold at some restaurants.

== See also ==
- Organic food
