= Ōkubo Station =

Ōkubo Station (大久保駅, Ōkubo-eki) is the name of multiple train stations in Japan.

- Ōkubo Station (Akita) - in Katagami, Akita Prefecture
- Ōkubo Station (Hyogo) - in Akashi, Hyōgo Prefecture
- Ōkubo Station (Kyoto) - in Uji, Kyoto Prefecture
- Ōkubo Station (Tokyo) - in Shinjuku, Tokyo
- Shin-Ōkubo Station - in Shinjuku, Tokyo
- Keisei-Ōkubo Station - in Narashino, Chiba Prefecture
- Kazusa-Ōkubo Station - in Ichihara, Chiba Prefecture
