= Oga Yashiro =

Oga Yashiro was a traitor who offered to let Takeda Katsuyori into the Tokugawa-controlled castle at Okazaki. His plot was discovered and he died by the bamboo saw after 7 days.
