= Ohashi Kannon-ji =

Buddhist temple in Sasebo, Nagasaki, Japan

Ohashi Kannon-ji 御橋観音寺
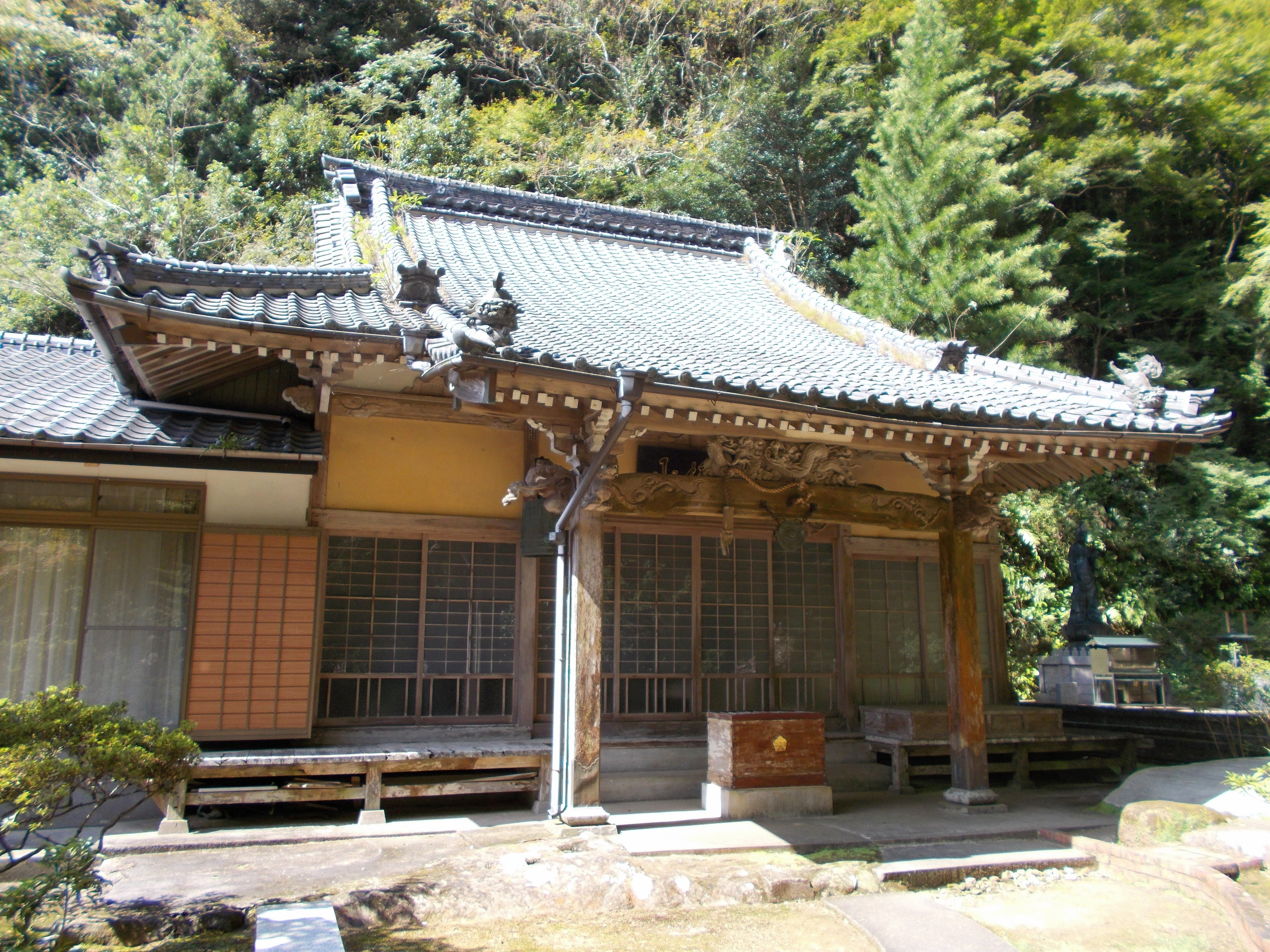
- Main Hall

Religion
- Affiliation: Chizan Shingon
- Deity: Jūichimen Kannon (Eleven-Faced Avalokiteśvara)

Location
- Location: 94 Naoya, Yoshii-chō, Sasebo, Nagasaki Prefecture
- Country: Japan
- Interactive map of Ohashi Kannon-ji 御橋観音寺
- Coordinates: 33°16′23″N 129°42′02″E

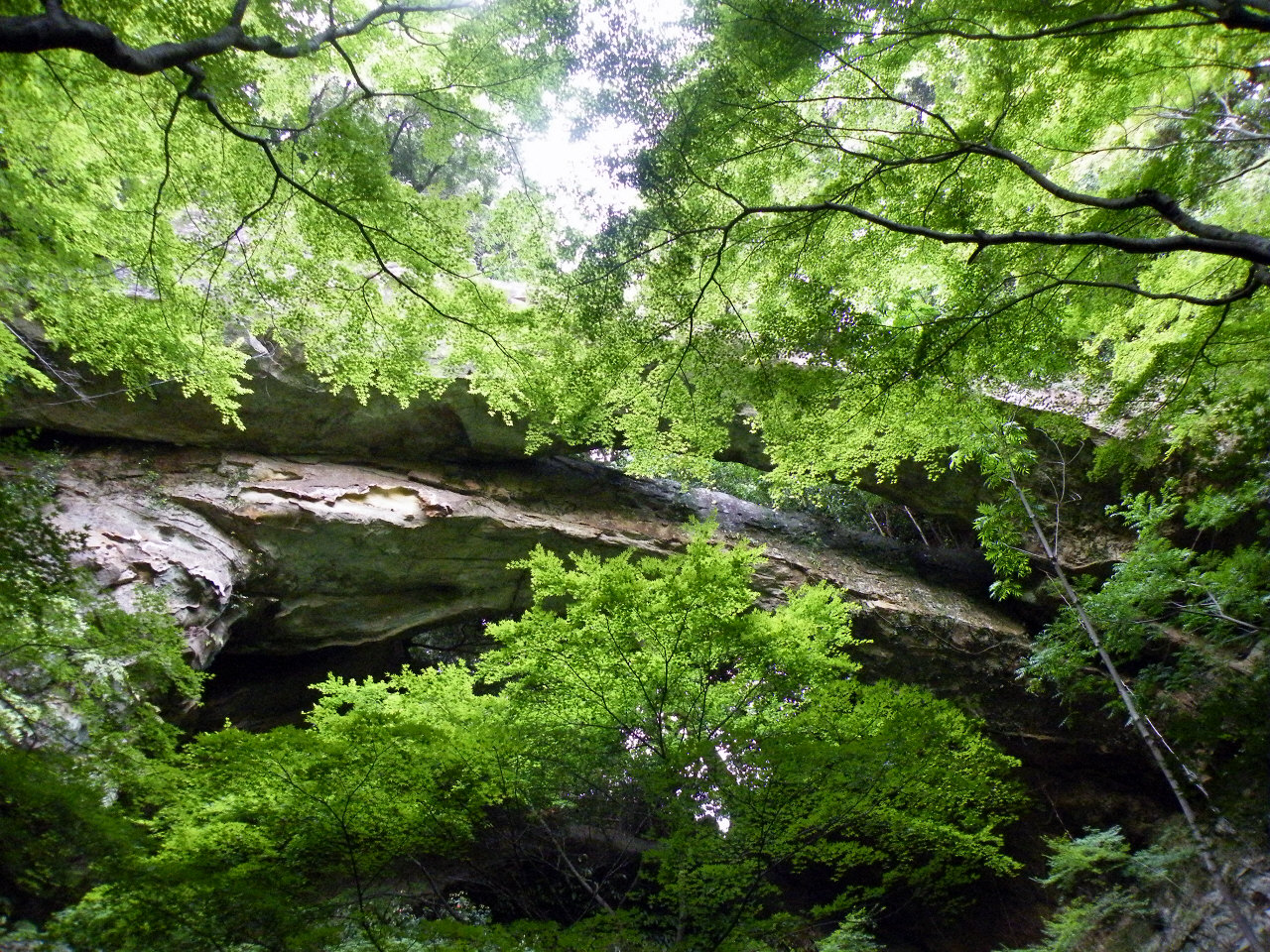
The stone bridge of Ohashi Kannon-ji

Ohashi Kannon-ji (御橋観音寺) is a Buddhist temple of the Shingon-shū Chizan-ha in Sasebo, Nagasaki, Japan. Its honorary sangō prefix is Sekkyōzan (石橋山).

According to the temple story, Ohashi Kannon-ji was founded in the early 8th century by Gyōki, who traveled around Japan to preach to commoners.

The temple precincts are a natural stone bridge made by erosion of tertiary sandstone with two lines. It is one of the Hirado Hakkei (平戸八景) eight landscapes within the former territory of Hirado Domain.
