= Oshikura Manju =

Japanese singing game

Oshikura Manju (押し競饅頭) is a simple Japanese singing game that is played on cold days in order to get warm.

The game is played with at least three players, but it is better if there are more. The players first gather around in a circle, as close to each other as possible. They face the outside, standing back to back with each other. When the game starts, the players powerfully shove backwards, pressing their backs towards other players' backs as they chant "Oshikura Manju osarete nakuna", meaning "Oshikura Manju don't cry when shoved". The chant is the most famous part of the song, and many people are familiar with only this part. However, the proper song continues; "Nakuko wa dare yowamushi kemushi hasannde sutero" ("Who is crying? Pinch the coward and caterpillar, and throw them away"). The players continue shoving each other, repeating this song over and over. There is no accurate end to this game.

One variation to the game is to play in a circle drawn on the ground. The game goes on with whoever pushed out of that circle getting out of the group, ending when one player left in the circle.

The word "Oshikura" in the name of this game is thought to have the meaning of "oshikurabe" (shoving competition), but originally, it was not a competitive game, but an easygoing one where players become absorbed in shoving each other vigorously, which results in them being warmed up.
