= Ōki, Fukuoka =

Ōki 大木町
- Town
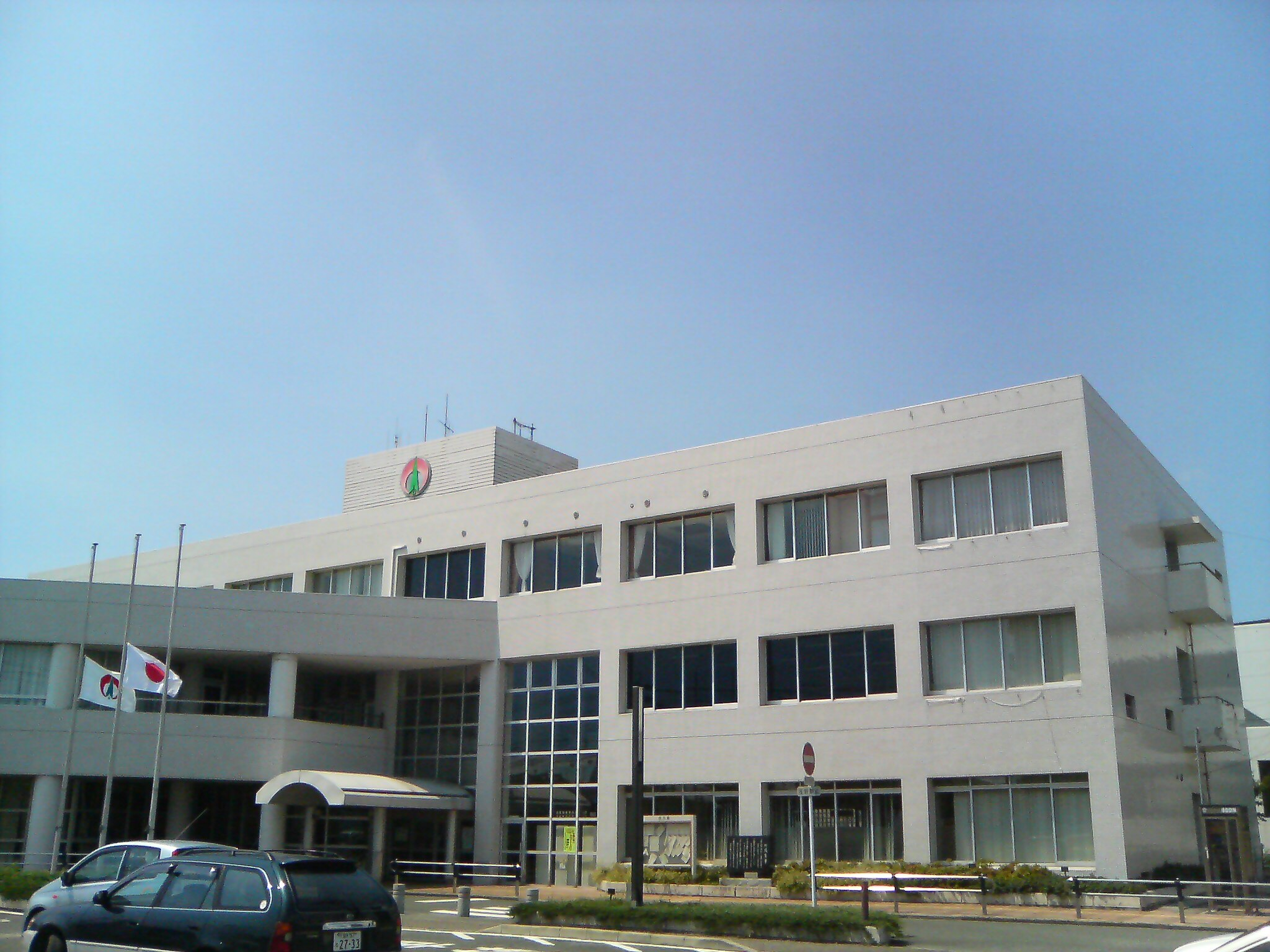
- Ōki Town Hall

- Flag Chapter
- Location of Ōki in Fukuoka Prefecture

- Location in Japan
- Coordinates: 33°12′38″N 130°26′23″E
- Country: Japan
- Region: Kyushu
- Prefecture: Fukuoka
- District: Mizuma

Area
  - Total: 18.44 km^{2} (7.12 sq mi)

Population (February 1, 2023)
  - Total: 13,716
  - Density: 743.8/km^{2} (1,926/sq mi)
- Time zone: UTC+09:00 (JST)
- City hall address: 255-1 Hachimachi Muta, Oki-machi, Mizuma-gun, Fukuoka-ken 830-0416
- Website: Official website
- Symbols
- Flower: Cosmos, Narcissus
- Tree: Ginkgo biloba

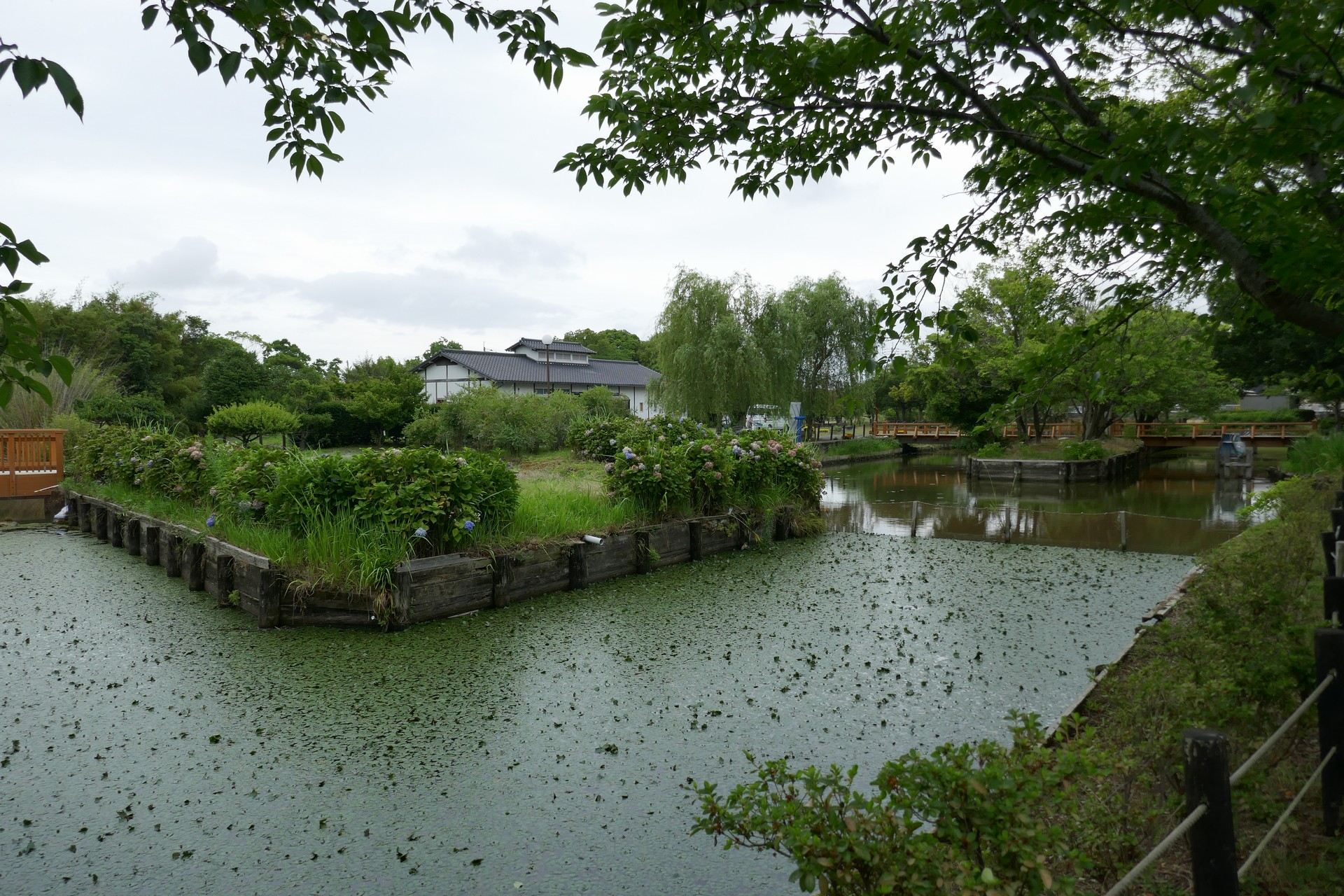
Ishimaruyama park

Ōki (大木町, Ōki-machi) is a town located in Mizuma District, Fukuoka Prefecture, Japan. As of 1 February 2024, the town had an estimated population of 13,716 in 5238 households, and a population density of 750 persons per km^{2}. The total area of the town is 18.44 km^{2} (7.12 sq mi).

== Geography ==
Ōki is locatedi in southwestern Fukuoka Prefecture, approximately 15 kilometers southwest of the center of Kurume City. The entire town is part of the Chikugo Plain, and a creek runs through the town.

=== Neighboring municipalities ===
Fukuoka Prefecture

- Chikugo
- Kurume
- Ōkawa
- Yanagawa

=== Climate ===
Ōki has a humid subtropical climate (Köppen Cfa) characterized by warm summers and cool winters with light to no snowfall. The average annual temperature in Ōki is 15.3 °C. The average annual rainfall is 1902 mm with September as the wettest month.

=== Demographics ===
Per Japanese census data, the population of Ōki is as shown below

Historical population
Year	Pop.	±%
1940	12,015	—
1950	14,527	+20.9%
1960	14,136	−2.7%
1970	12,885	−8.8%
1980	12,721	−1.3%
1990	13,232	+4.0%
2000	13,862	+4.8%
2010	14,350	+3.5%
2020	13,820	−3.7%

== History ==
The area of Ōki was part of ancient Chikugo Province and in the Heian period was the site of a shōen landed estate owned by the Tokudaiji family. During the Edo Period, the area was part of the holdings of Kurume Domain. The villages of Ōmizo, Kamachi, and Ōi were established on May 1, 1889, with the creation of the modern municipalities system. On April 1, 1955, these villages merged to form the town of Ōki.

== Government ==
Ōki has a mayor-council form of government with a directly elected mayor and a unicameral town council of 12 members. Ōki, collectively with the city of Ōkawa, contributes one member to the Fukuoka Prefectural Assembly. In terms of national politics, the town is part of the Fukuoka 6th district of the lower house of the Diet of Japan.

== Economy ==
The economy of Ōki is based on agriculture. Mushrooms are the major crop. A significant portion of the working population commutes to Kurume or the Fukuoka City.

== Education ==
Ōki has three public elementary high schools and one public junior high school operated by the town government. The town does not have a high school.

== Transportation ==
=== Railways ===
Nishitetsu Tenjin Ōmuta Line

- Ōmizo - Hatchōmuta

=== Highways ===
- National Route 442
