= Marumi Ogawa =

Japanese tarento and gravure idol (born 1981)

Ogawa Marumi 小川 まるみ (おがわ まるみ)
- Born: February 15, 1981 (age 45); Tokyo, Japan
- Modeling information
- Height: 5 ft 7 in (1.70 m)

Marumi Ogawa (小川まるみ, Ogawa Marumi; born February 15, 1981 in Tokyo, Japan) is a Japanese tarento and gravure idol. She graduated from the Tokyo University of Agriculture where she was a member of the Interact Club. She used to be a Gabu Girl and a member of the Miniskirt Police. Her hobbies include cooking, bowling, and piano.

== Appearances ==
=== Television ===
- Altemish Night
- Shutsudō! Miniskirt Police
- Tonight 2
- Tokyo Morning Supplement

=== Advertisement ===
- The Dai-ichi Mutual Life Insurance Company (1999)

=== Film ===
- Mr. Rookie (2002)

== Works ==
=== Photobooks ===
- Natsu Gaburi!! (September 1999)
- F no Kanjō. (October 1999)
