= Hideo Ohkubo =

Japanese businessman

Hideo Ohkubo (大久保 秀夫, Ōkubo Hideo; born 1954) is the founder, chairman, and president of Tokyo-based Forval Corporation.

== Education and early career ==
Ohkubo was born in Tokyo. He graduated from the Law department of Kokugakuin University. He worked at both traditional Japanese large-scaled corporations and the foreign-oriented full-commission based companies and saw the advantages and disadvantages over each other. He thus got the idea to undertake the creation of a company with the advantages of both types of companies.

== Forval's founding ==
He founded Nippon Kouhan (日本工販) in 1980. Within a year of its founding, it had already become Japan's top business telephone leasing company. In 1988 his company went public on JASDAQ, becoming the youngest company in history to do so. That same year he won the "Young Entrepreneur of the Year" Award from the New Business Convention.

In 2000 Forval Telecom made its first public offering on the Mothers board of the Tokyo Stock Exchange. In 2001 Forval Creative made a public offering on NASDAQ Japan (now the Hercules market of the Osaka Securities Exchange).

== Other activities ==
Ohkubo supports financing and various arrangements that have encouraged past Forval employees and business partners to create their own successful companies, some of which have since gone public. He also works with the Forval Foundation, which sponsors the "Stradivarius Scholarship" to grant the winner of a violinist competition the free use of the foundation's Stradivarius violin for 2 years.

He is a leadership committee member of the Tokyo Chamber of Commerce, vice-committee chairman of Advancement of New Industry, and vice-chairman of the New Business Convention.

== Publications ==
- 武士道に学ぶビジネスマン48の心得 [Businessman’s study of 48 samurai principles], 東急エージェンシー出版部 [Tokkyū Agency Publishing], October 1995, ISBN 978-4-88497-040-6
- やり抜けば仕事は必ず面白くなる！思い抜き、考え抜いて壁を越える [Stay the course at work and it will become interesting! Thoughts about the crossover point], かんき出版 [Kanki Publishing], June 2005, ISBN 978-4-7612-6261-7
- ディシジョンメイキング [Decision-making], ワンプルーフ, April 2010, ISBN 978-4-9904709-1-3. Co-authored with Hironori Higashide (東出浩教).
