= Daizenji Station =

Railway station in Kurume, Fukuoka Prefecture, Japan

Daizenji Station 大善寺駅
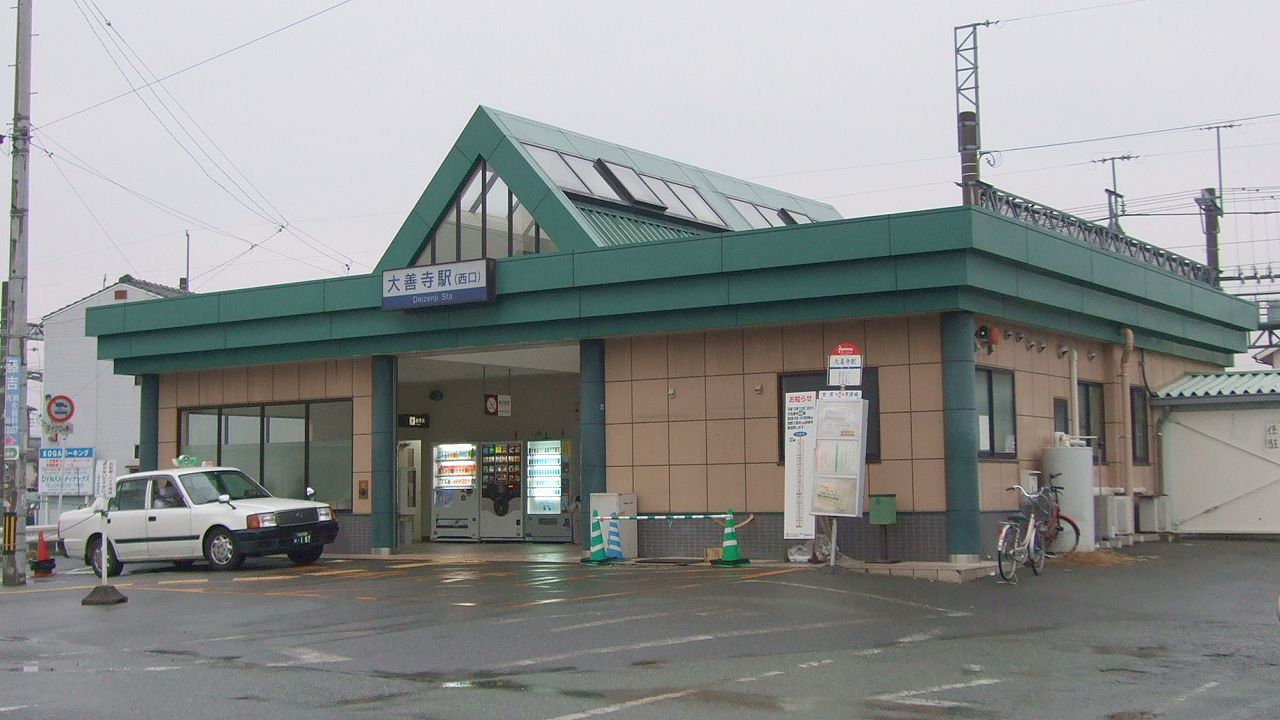
- Daizenji Station building

General information
- Location: Miyamoto Daizenjimachi, Kurume-shi, Fukuoka-ken 830-0073; Japan
- Coordinates: 33°16′16.33″N 130°28′27.9″E
- Operator: Nishi-Nippon Railroad
- Line: ■ Tenjin Ōmuta Line
- Distance: 45.1 km from Nishitetsu Fukuoka (Tenjin)
- Platforms: 2 side platforms
- Connections

Construction
- Structure type: At-grade

Other information
- Status: Staffed
- Station code: T32
- Website: Official website

History
- Opened: 30 December 1912

Passengers
- FY2022: 2973

Services
Preceding station	Nishitetsu	Following station
Yasutake towards Nishitetsu Fukuoka (Tenjin)	Tenjin Ōmuta Line Local	Mizuma towards Ōmuta
Hanabatake towards Nishitetsu Fukuoka (Tenjin)	Tenjin Ōmuta Line Express	Nishitetsu Yanagawa towards Ōmuta
Nishitetsu Kurume towards Nishitetsu Fukuoka (Tenjin)	Tenjin Ōmuta Line Limited Express	Nishitetsu Yanagawa towards Ōmuta
Location
- Location within Fukuoka Prefecture Location within Japan

Daizenji Station (大善寺駅, Daizenji-eki) is a passenger railway station located in the city of Kurume, Fukuoka, Japan. It is operated by the private transportation company Nishi-Nippon Railroad (NNR), and has station number T32.

== Lines ==
The station is served by the Nishitetsu Tenjin Ōmuta Line and is 45.1 kilometers from the starting point of the line at Nishitetsu Fukuoka (Tenjin) Station.

== Station layout ==
The station consists of a two island platform connected by a level crossings with the station building, and one siding track. The station is staffed.

== Platforms ==
1, 2	■ Tenjin Ōmuta Line	for Nishitetsu Yanagawa and Ōmuta
3, 4	■ Tenjin Ōmuta Line	for Nishitetsu Kurume, Nishitetsu Futsukaichi and Fukuoka

== History ==
The station opened on 30 December 1912 as a station on the Okawa Railway. TIn 1937, the Okawa Railway merged with the Kyushu Railway and the line was electrified and incorporated into the Omuta Line. The company merged with the Kyushu Electric Tramway on 19 September 1942. The company changed its name to Nishi-Nippon Railway three days later, on 22 September 1942. The current station building was completed in 1959.

== Passenger statistics ==
In fiscal 2022, the station was used by 2973 passengers daily.

== Surrounding area ==
- Kurume City Daizenji Elementary School
- Onzuka-Gongenzuka Kofun

== See also ==
- List of railway stations in Japan
