= Nishitetsu Kurume Station =

Railway station in Kurume, Fukuoka Prefecture, Japan

Nishitetsu Kurume Station 西鉄久留米駅
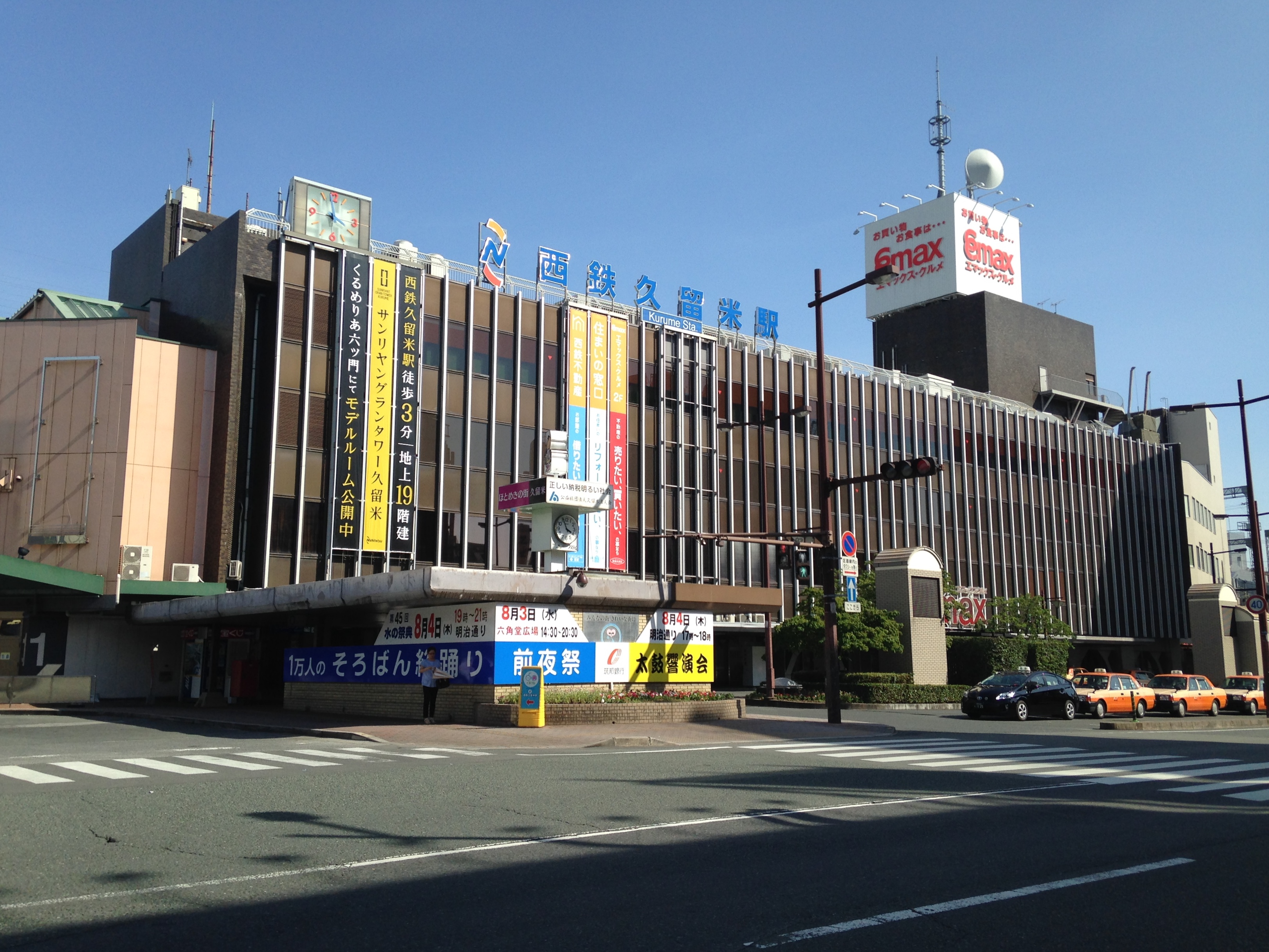
- Nishitetsu Kurume Station building

General information
- Location: Higashimachi, Kurume-shi, Fukuoka-ken 830-0033; Japan
- Coordinates: 33°18′44.53″N 130°31′15.93″E
- Operator: Nishi-Nippon Railroad
- Line: ■ Tenjin Ōmuta Line
- Distance: 38.6 km from Nishitetsu Fukuoka (Tenjin)
- Platforms: 2 island platforms
- Connections

Construction
- Structure type: At-grade

Other information
- Status: Staffed
- Station code: T27
- Website: Official website

History
- Opened: 12 April 1924
- Former names: Kurume (to 1939); Kyutetsu Kurume (to1943)

Passengers
- FY2022: 28,355

Services
Preceding station	Nishitetsu	Following station
Kushiwara towards Nishitetsu Fukuoka (Tenjin)	Tenjin Ōmuta Line Local	Hanabatake towards Ōmuta
Miyanojin towards Nishitetsu Fukuoka (Tenjin)	Tenjin Ōmuta Line Express	Hanabatake towards Ōmuta
Nishitetsu Futsukaichi towards Nishitetsu Fukuoka (Tenjin)	Tenjin Ōmuta Line Limited Express	Hanabatake towards Ōmuta
Location
- Location within Fukuoka Prefecture Location within Japan

Nishitetsu Kurume Station (西鉄久留米駅, Nishitetsu Kurume eki) is a passenger railway station located in the city of Kurume, Fukuoka, Japan. It is operated by the private transportation company Nishi-Nippon Railroad (NNR), and has station number T27. The Nishitetsu Kurume bus terminal is on the first floor.

== Lines ==
The station is served by the Nishitetsu Tenjin Ōmuta Line and is 38.6 kilometers from the starting point of the line at Nishitetsu Fukuoka (Tenjin) Station.

== Station layout ==
The station consists of two opposed elevated island platforms on the third story of the station building, with the station facilities occupying the second story underneath. The station is staffed.

== Platforms ==
1, 2	■ Tenjin Ōmuta Line	for Nishitetsu Yanagawa and Ōmuta
3, 4	■ Tenjin Ōmuta Line	for Nishitetsu Futsukaichi and Fukuoka

== History ==
The station opened on 12 April 1924 as Kurume Station on the Kyushu Railway. The name was changed to Kyutetsu Kurume Station (九鉄久留米駅) on 1 July 1939. The company merged with the Kyushu Electric Tramway on 19 September 1942. The company changed its name to Nishi-Nippon Railway three days later, on 22 September 1942, with the station name changing to its current name on the same date. The current station building dates from 1969.

== Passenger statistics ==
In fiscal 2022, the station was used by 28,355 passengers daily.

== Surrounding area ==
The station is located near the urban center of Kurume.

== See also ==
- List of railway stations in Japan
