= Kokubu Tile Kiln ruins =

Archaeological site in Japan

- 国分瓦窯跡 (Japanese)
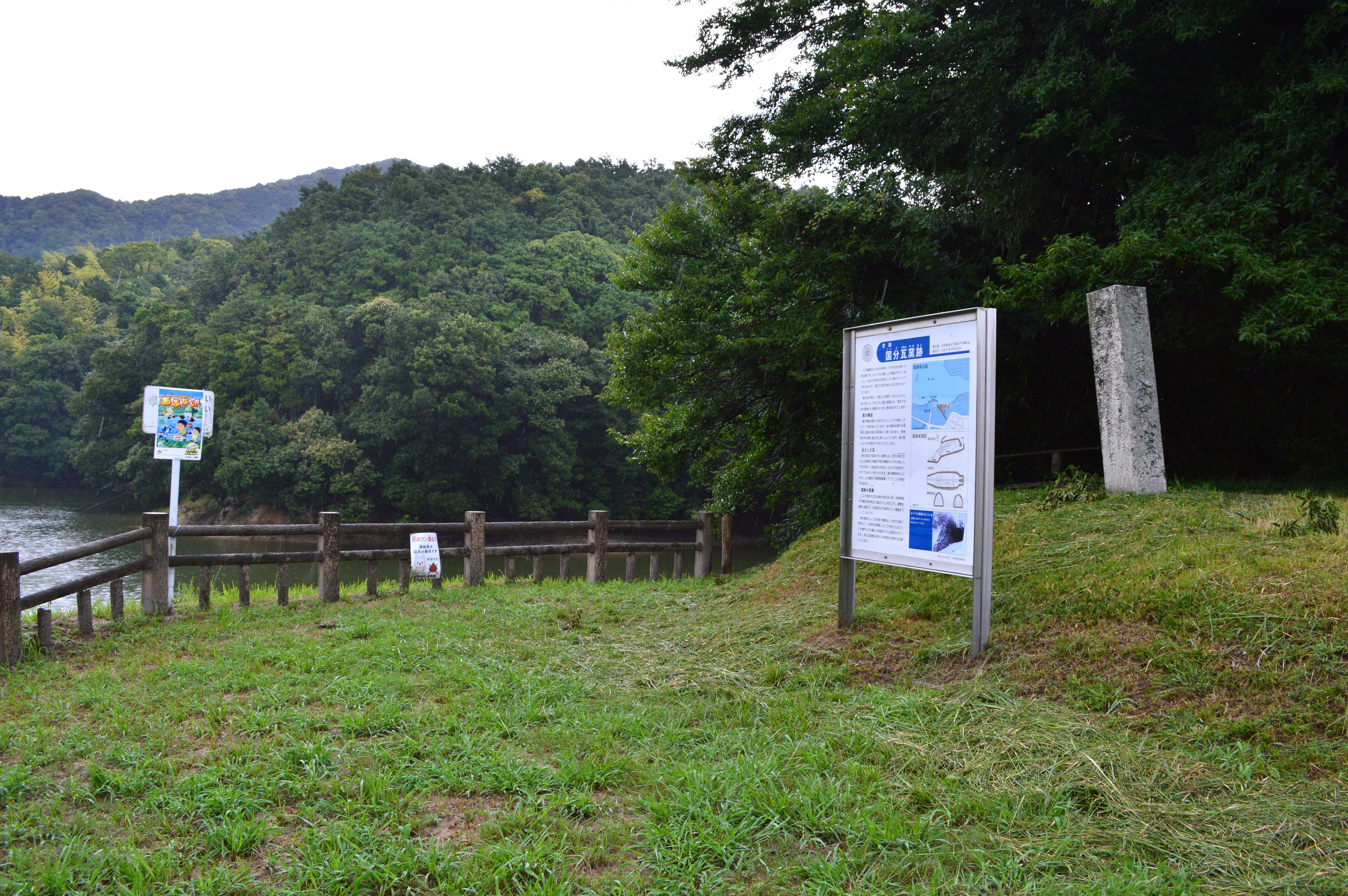
- Kokubu Tile Kiln ruins

- Kokubu Tile Kiln ruins Kokubu Tile Kiln ruins (Japan)
- Interactive map of Kokubu Tile Kiln ruins
- 33°31′17″N 130°30′33″E
- Type: kiln ruins
- Periods: Nara period
- Location: Dazaifu, Fukuoka, Japan
- Region: Kyushu

Site notes
- Public access: Yes

The Kokubu Tile Kiln ruins (国分瓦窯跡, Kokubu kawara gama ato) is an archaeological site with the ruins of a Nara period kiln, located in the city of Dazaifu, Fukuoka Prefecture Japan. It was designated a National Historic Site of Japan in 1922.

== Overview ==
Kawara (瓦) roof tiles made of fired clay were introduced to Japan from Baekche during the 6th century along with Buddhism. During the 570s under the reign of Emperor Bidatsu, the king of Baekche sent six people to Japan skilled in various aspects of Buddhism, including a temple architect. Initially, tiled roofs were a sign of great wealth and prestige, and used for temple and government buildings. The material had the advantages of great strength and durability, and could also be made at locations around the country wherever clay was available.

The Kokubu Tile Kiln ruins are located approximately 200 meters northeast of the Chikuzen Kokubun-ji ruins. More than nine noborigama-style kilns were built in a valley, but during the Edo period a dam was built and submerged the site. Two of the kilns have been excavated and were found to be 1.5 meters high, 5.5 meters deep, and 1.5 meters wide, and to be constructed of sun-dried bricks. It is constructed in an arched manner and finished by painting clay on top. The kilns date from the Nara period, and were made to supply the roof tiles necessary for the construction of the adjacent Chikuzen Kokubun-ji monastery and Chikuzen Kokubun-niji nunnery as well as the temple of Kanzeon-ji. The tiles had a similar pattern to those which have been excavated from the Heijō Palace site.

The site is approximately a 15-minute walk from Tofurōmae Station on the Nishitetsu Tenjin Ōmuta Line; however, the kiln remains have been backfilled and are lso located under the surface of the reservoir.

== See also ==
- List of Historic Sites of Japan (Fukuoka)
