= Kaidan-in =

Buddhist temple in Fukuoka Prefecture, Japan

Coordinates: 33°30′53.22″N 130°31′14.98″E

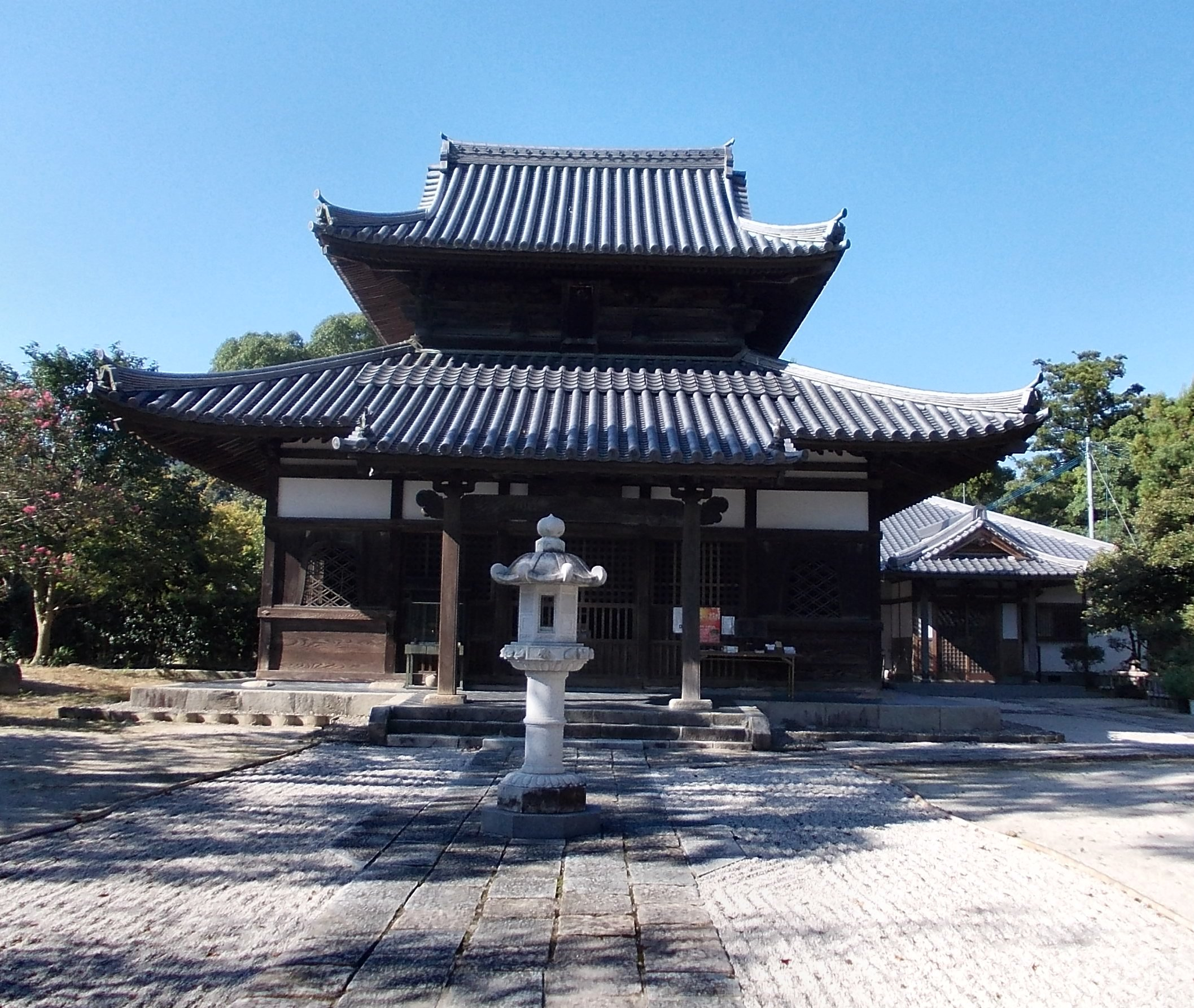
Main Hall

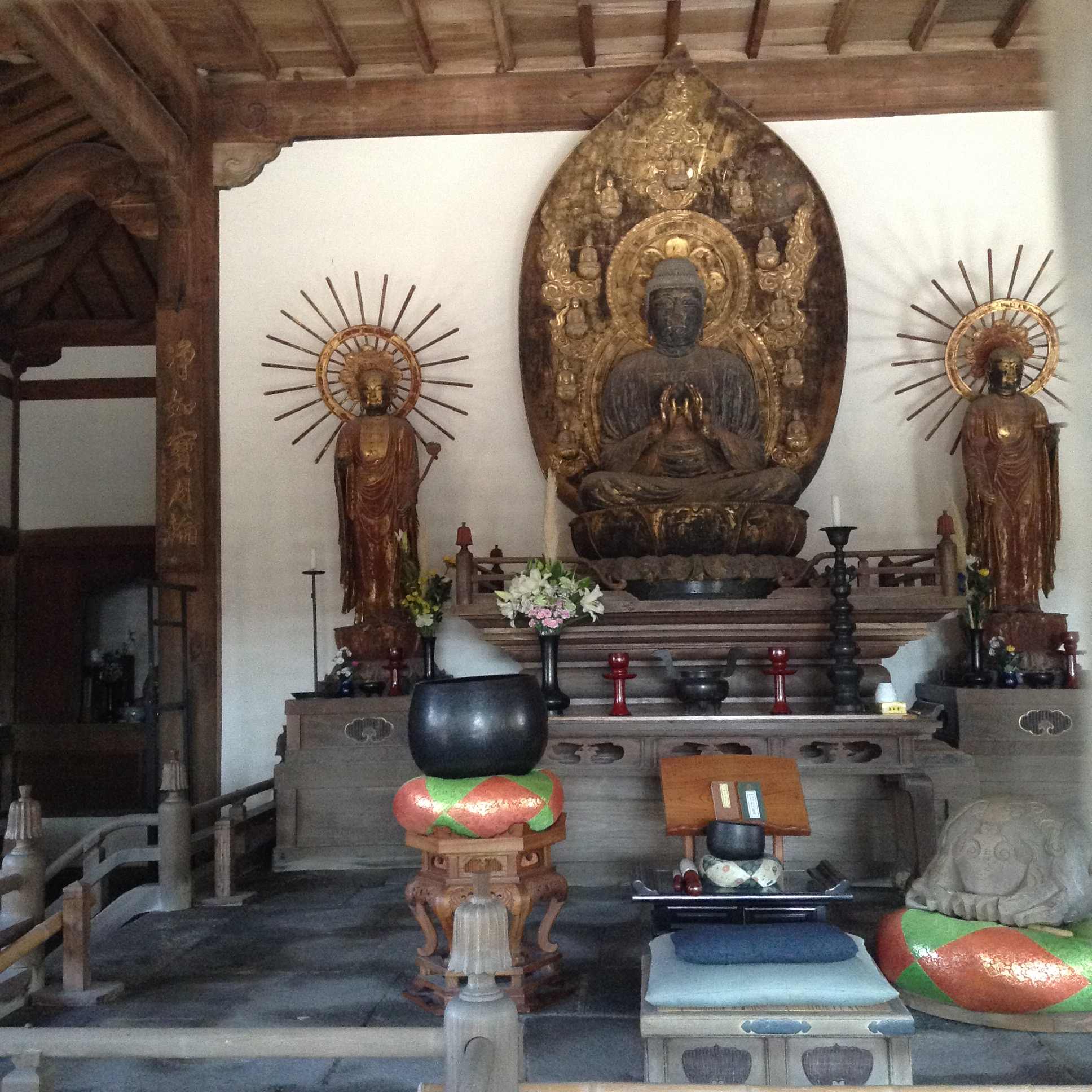
Vairocana

Kaidan-in (戒壇院) is a Rinzai temple in Dazaifu, Fukuoka Prefecture, Japan. It was founded by Ganjin in 761. Together with Tōdai-ji in Nara and Yakushi-ji in Tochigi Prefecture, it was one of Japan's three official ordination halls during the Nara period.

== History ==
Kaidan-in was first built in 761; the present hall dates to the 17th century. Originally part of Kanzeon-ji, it later came to be administered separately.

== Treasures ==
The seated statue of Rushana Buddha (毘盧遮那仏), from the late Heian period, is located in Kaidan-in's worship hall. Rushana is a form of the cosmic Buddha, Dainichi (Vairocana). The deity was introduced in the Nara period. It is important cultural properties designated by the government.

== See also ==
- Kanzeon-ji
