= Dazaifu Gakkōin =

Historic university site in Fukuoka, Japan

- 大宰府学校院跡 (Japanese)
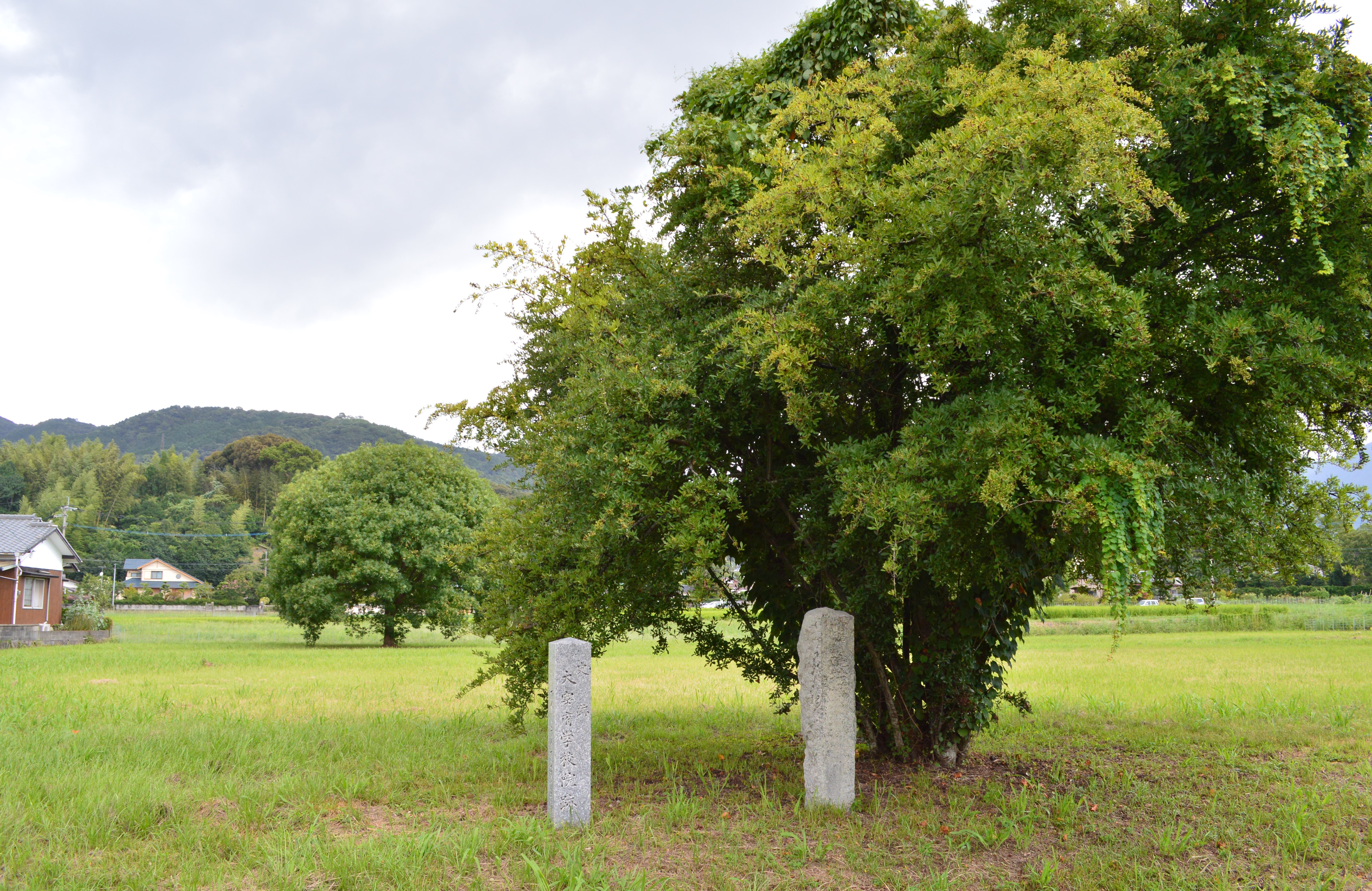
- Dazaifu Gakkōin site

- Dazaifu Gakkōin site Dazaifu Gakkōin (Japan)
- 33°30′53″N 130°31′08″E
- Periods: Kofun period
- Location: Dazaifu, Fukuoka, Japan
- Region: Kyushu

History
- Built: c.8th century

Site notes
- Public access: Yes
- National Historic Site of Japan

The Dazaifu Gakkōin (大宰府学校院跡) was a university in Nara and Heian period Japan, located in what is now the city of Dazaifu, Fukuoka Prefecture, Japan. The site was designated a National Historic Site of Japan in 1949, with the area under protection adjusted in 1970.

== Overview ==
The Dazaifu Gakkōin was an institution for training government officials. It was located between the Dazaifu Government Office and Kanzeon-ji Temple. Although it is not clear when it was established; it is believed to have been founded with the implementation of the Ritsuryō system following the Taika Reforms. Along with importing a structure of government modeled after Tang China, the fledgling Japanese state also imported the concept of a civil service examination system administered for the purpose of selecting candidates for state bureaucracy based on merit rather than by birth. This was intended to lead to the rise of a gentry class of scholar-bureaucrats which could offset the power of hereditary aristocracy and the military. The Dazaifu Gakkōin first appears in historical documentation in 781, in which it was recorded that the school had 200 students from six provinces of Kyushu. Subjects necessary for government officials, such as politics, medicine, arithmetic, and writing were taught, using books such as the Four Books and Five Classics. Under the Ritsuryō system, each province was to have a national academy, where if a student completed the required subjects within a given year and passed an exam, he would be hired as an official; however, the six provinces of Chikuzen, Chikugo, Buzen, Bungo, Hizen, and Higo had no such facility, and students were all sent to the Dazaifu Gakkōin. The school appears to have ceased operating around the end of the Heian period.

Archaeological excavations starting in 1969 found the foundations of four buried-pillar buildings. Two are thought to be one-by-two bay warehouse-style buildings, and one was a four-by-seven bay building with eaves extending north and south, that is thought to be the central building. It is estimated that this building dates back to the first half of the Heian period. Seven buried pillar foundation buildings, a north–south ditch, and the remains of an earthen rampart-like structure were discovered on the eastern side of the site. The buildings were rebuilt three times, with the oldest foundations dating from the latter half of the Nara period. The north–south ditch existed from the Heian period into the Muromachi period. The complete extent of the site has yet to be determined.

The site is approximately a 15-minute walk from Tofurōmae Station on the Nishitetsu Tenjin Ōmuta Line.

== See also ==
- List of Historic Sites of Japan (Fukuoka)
