= Fukuoka Junior College for Kindergarten Teachers =

Private junior college in Japan

Coordinates: 33.506327°N 130.525117°E

Fukuoka Junior College for Kindergarten Teachers (福岡こども短期大学, Fukuoka Kodomo Tanki Daigaku) is a private junior college in Dazaifu, Fukuoka, Japan, established in 1975. The present name of the school was adopted in 2008.
