= Fukuoka International University =

Higher education institution in Fukuoka Prefecture, Japan

Coordinates: 33°30′36″N 130°31′55″E

- 福岡国際大学; Fukuoka kokusai daigaku
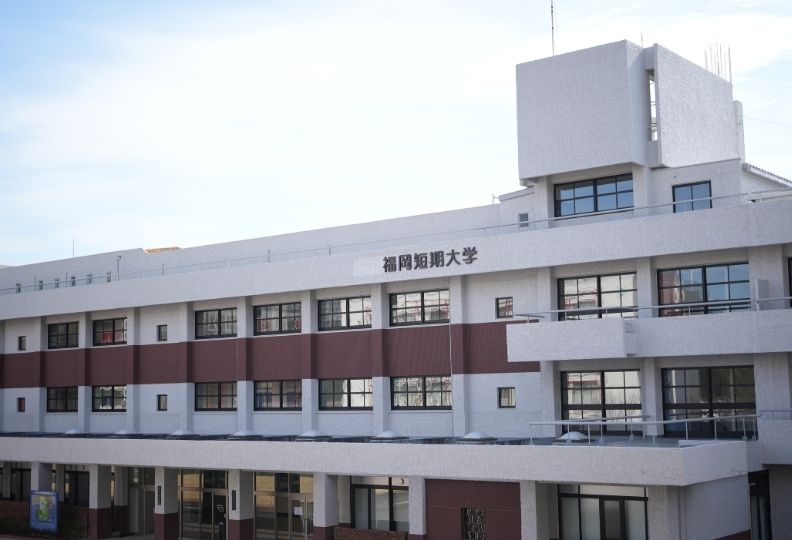
- Fukuoka International University
- Type: Private
- Established: 1998
- Location: Dazaifu, Fukuoka, Japan
- Website: Official website

Fukuoka International University (福岡国際大学, Fukuoka kokusai daigaku) was a private university in Dazaifu, Fukuoka, Japan, established in 1998.
