= Fukuoka Women's Junior College =

Private university junior college headquartered in Dazaifu, Fukuoka Prefecture, Japan

Coordinates: 33.5101°N 130.5320°E

- 福岡女子短期大学
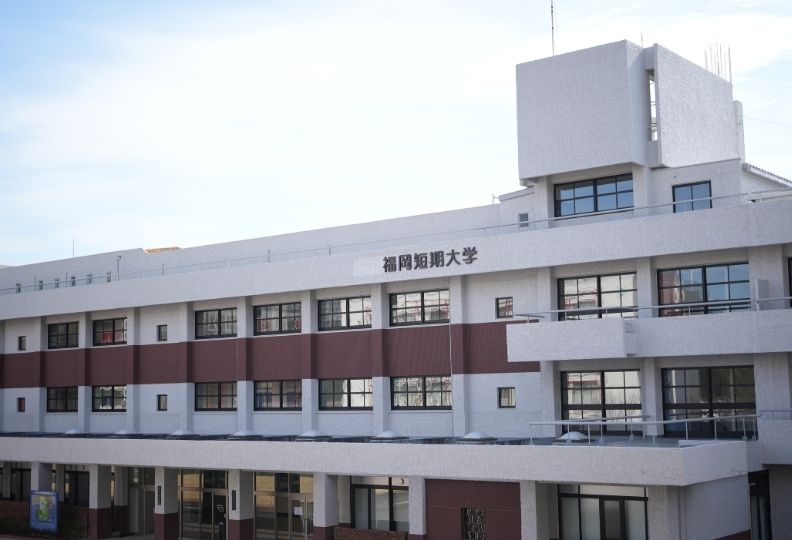
- Fukuoka Women's Junior College
- Established: 1966
- Location: Dazaifu, Fukuoka, Japan
- Website: www.fukuoka-wjc.ac.jp

Fukuoka Women's Junior College (福岡女子短期大学, Fukuoka Joshi Tankidaigaku) is a private university junior college headquartered in Japan 4-16-1 Gojo Dazaifu, Fukuoka Prefecture. It was established in 1966. There is no relationship between the corporation and another similar names Fukuoka Women's University.
