= Fukuoka Social Medical Welfare University =

Higher education institution in Fukuoka Prefecture, Japan

Coordinates: 33.5068°N 130.5253°E

Fukuoka Social Medical Welfare University (福岡医療福祉大学, Fukuoka Iryō Fukushi Daigaku) was a private university in Dazaifu, Fukuoka, Japan. The school was founded in 2002 and adopted the present name in 2008. It closed in 2017.
