= Chikushi Jogakuen University =

Private women's college in Fukuoka, Japan

Coordinates: 33°30′47″N 130°32′14″E

- 筑紫女学園大学; Chikushi jogakuen daigaku
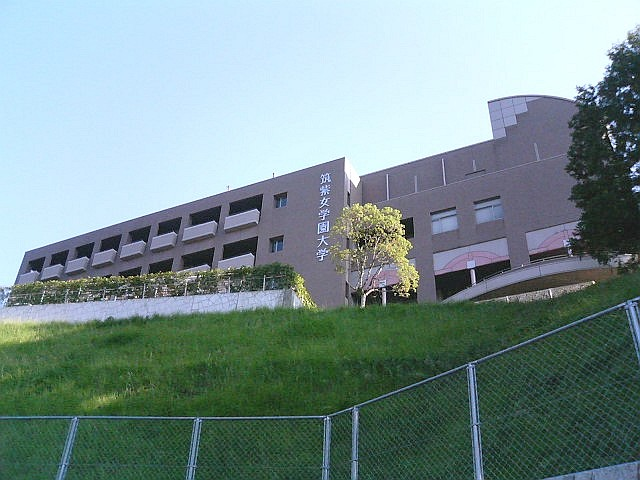
- Building 3 at Chikushi Jogakuen University
- Type: Private women's university
- Established: 1988
- Founders: Rev. Tetsuei Mizuki (Chikushi Jogakuen)
- Parent institution: Chikushi Jogakuen
- Religious affiliation: Jōdo Shinshū
- President: Masanori Nagakawa
- Academic staff: 97
- Students: 2,832
- Postgraduates: 14
- Location: Dazaifu, Fukuoka, Japan
- Website: Official website

Chikushi Jogakuen University (筑紫女学園大学, Chikushi jogakuen daigaku), abbreviated as Chikujo (筑女, Chikujo) is a private women's college in Dazaifu, Fukuoka, Japan.

== Overview ==
The university is owned by Chikushi Jogakuen Educational Corporation (学校法人筑紫女学園, Gakkō Hōjin Chikushi Jogakuen), which is a member of Ryūkoku Sōgō Gakuen (龍谷総合学園, Ryūkoku Sōgō Gakuen), an alliance of Hongan-ji Jōdo Shinshū Buddhist schools.

The university aims to provide an education based on a Buddhist ethos.

== History ==
The educational corporation originated with the opening of Chikushi Private Girls High School (私立筑紫高等女学校, shiritsu Chikushi kōtō jogakkō) in 1907. The junior college, Chikushi Jogakuen Junior College (筑紫女学園短期大学, Chikushi jogakuen tanki daigaku) opened in 1965, and the four-year university opened in 1988.

== Academics ==
The university comprises the following faculties and departments:

=== Undergraduate ===
- Faculty of Literature
  - Department of Japanese Language and Literature
  - Department of English
  - Department of Asian Studies
- Faculty of Human Sciences
- Faculty of Contemporary Social Studies
  - Department of Contemporary Social Studies

=== Graduate ===
- Graduate School of Human Sciences
