= Tetsugyū Enshin =

Japanese Buddhist monk

Tetsugyū Enshin (鉄牛円心) (1254–1326) was a Buddhist monk of the Tōfuku-ji Rinzai school and follower of Enni. He is celebrated as the founder of Kōmyōzen-ji (光明禅寺) in Chikuzen Province, modern Fukuoka Prefecture.
