= Kōmyōzen-ji =

Buddhist temple in Fukuoka Prefecture, Japan

Coordinates: 33°31′06″N 130°32′03″E

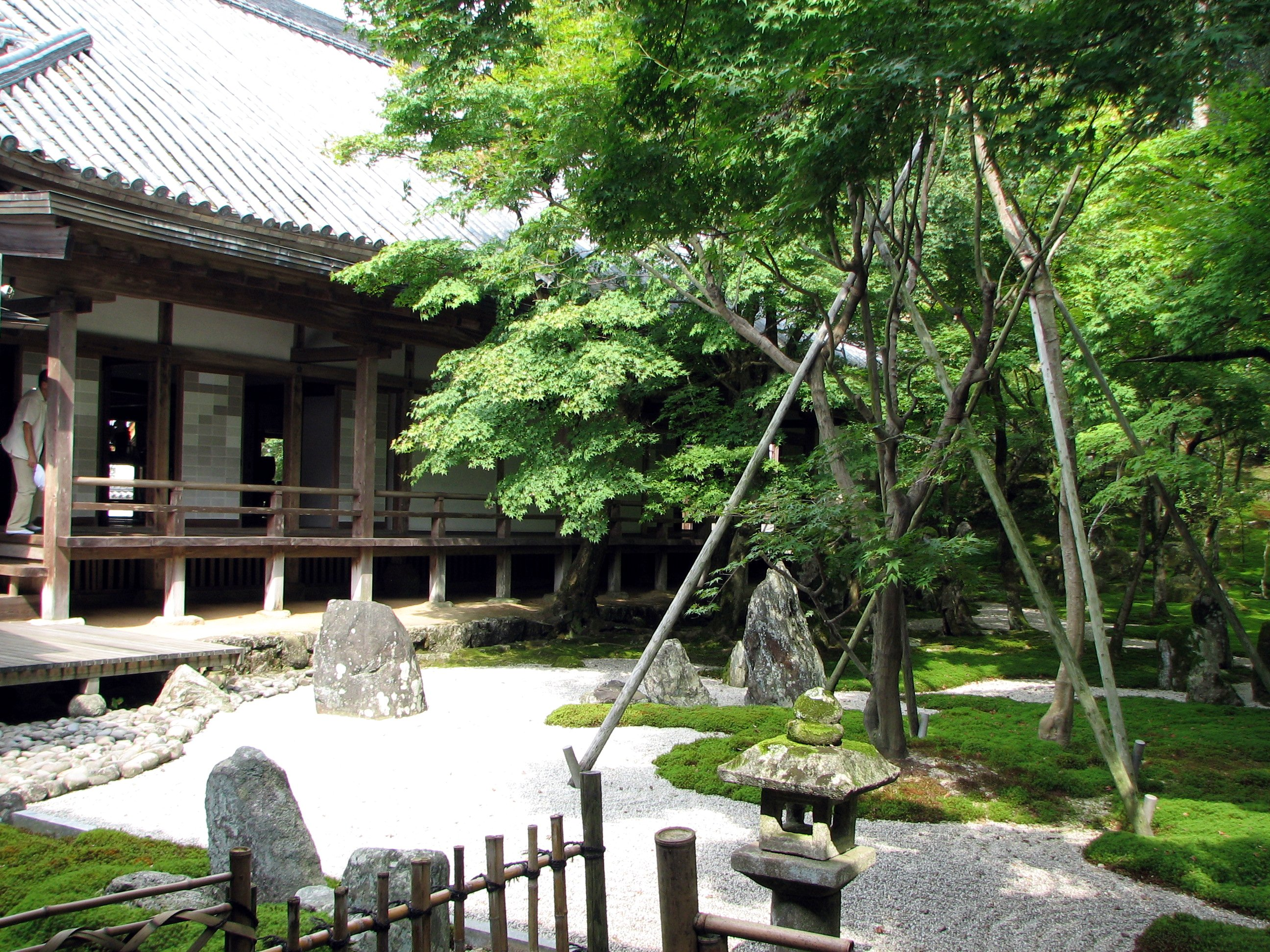
Karesansui garden at Kōmyōzen-ji

Kōmyōzen-ji (光明禅寺) is a Zen temple in Dazaifu, Fukuoka Prefecture, Japan. It was founded by Tetsugyū Enshin of the Tōfuku-ji Rinzai school in 1273. Kōmyōzen-ji is celebrated for its karesansui garden, the only example in Kyushu.

== See also ==
- Dazaifu Tenman-gū
- Kanzeon-ji
- Japanese garden
