= Chikuzen Kokubun-ji =

Buddhist temple in Dazaifu, Fukuoka, Japan

Chikuzen Kokubun-ji 筑前国分寺
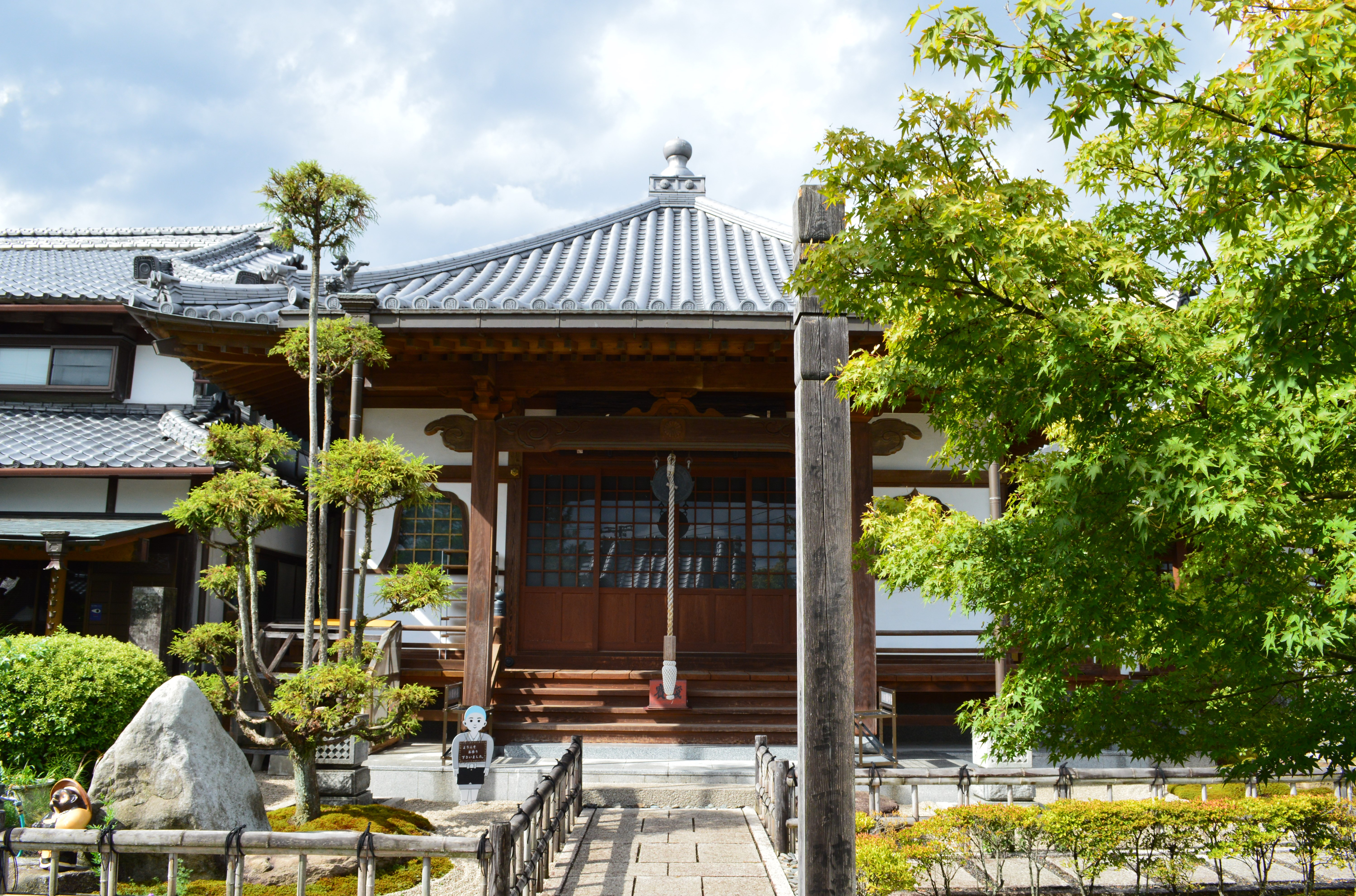
- Chikuzen Kokubun-ji Hondo

- Chikuzen Kokubun-ji Chikuzen Kokubun-ji (Japan)

Religion
- Affiliation: Buddhist
- Deity: Yakushi Nyōrai
- Rite: Kōyasan Shingon-shū

Location
- Location: 4-13-1Kokubunchō, Dazaifu-shi, Fukuoka-ken
- Country: Japan
- Interactive map of Chikuzen Kokubun-ji 筑前国分寺
- Coordinates: 33°34′15″N 130°30′24″E

Architecture
- Founder: Emperor Shōmu
- Completed: c.747
- National Important Cultural Property National Historic Site of Japan

Chikuzen Kokubun-ji (筑前国分寺) is a Kōyasan Shingon-shū Buddhist temple in the Kokubunji neighborhood of the city of Dazaifu, Fukuoka, Japan. Its honzon is a statue of Yakushi Nyorai. It is one of the few surviving provincial temples established by Emperor Shōmu during the Nara period (710 – 794). Due to this connection, the foundation stones of the Nara period temple overlapping the present day complex were designated as a National Historic Site in 1922.

== History ==
The Shoku Nihongi records that in 741, as the country recovered from a major smallpox epidemic, Emperor Shōmu ordered that a monastery and nunnery be established in every province, the kokubunji (国分寺). These temples were built to a semi-standardized template, and served both to spread Buddhist orthodoxy to the provinces, and to emphasize the power of the Nara period centralized government under the Ritsuryō system.

The Chikuzen Kokubun-ji is located on a plateau northwest of the Dazaifu Government Office ruins. The modern temple overlaps the Nara period temple ruins. To the west are the ruins of the Kokubun-niji nunnery (not part of the National Historic Site designation), and to the east are Kokubu Tile Kiln ruins (separate National Historic Site designation) where the roof tiles for both temples were fired. Although created by Emperor Shōmu's edict, no documentary evidence of the precise date of the founding of the temple has survived. The earliest record dates from 801, when Buddhist statues and ritual implements were moved from a temple called Shiō-in to this temple, but were returned to their original location in 801. The temple also appears in the Engishiki records in the early 10th century. The temple then disappears from the historical record for centuries thereafter, and by the middle Edo period had been reduced to a small hermitage housing a statue of Yakushi Nyorai. However, this was not the original Nara period sculpture, but was a newer version carved in the Muromachi period. The temple was subsequently abolished, but a priest from Edo rebuilt the hermitage and in the Genbun (1736–1741) and Tenmei eras (1781–1789), restoration and revitalization were attempted. The Main Hall burned down in 1827 and the Kuri was rebuilt in 1833.

During archaeological excavations, original temple compound was found to be 192 meters square, and to contain the central gate, main hall, and auditorium arranged in a straight line, with cloisters extending from the left and right sides of the central gate to the main hall. The Five-story pagoda was enclosed by the cloister. This style, which is different from Tōdai-ji and the standardized layout of kokubun-ji temples (where the pagoda is outside the cloister) is common in temples in Kyushu founded before the Nara period. From the size of the pagoda foundations, it was a seven-story structure. A one-tenth scale replica of it is on display outside the Dazaifu City Cultural Fureai Museum. Per excavations, it appears that in the 9th century, the pagoda and lecture hall were renovated from a buried pillar foundation to a rough stone foundation, and that the pagoda disappeared in the 10th century followed by the lecture hall in the 11th century. Today, the current Kokubun-ji Hondō stands on the site of the original Kondō, and the positions of the surrounding auditorium, pagoda, and corridor have been restored.

The temple is a seven-minute walk (1.4 kilometers) from Tofurōmae Station on the Nishitetsu Tenjin Ōmuta Line.

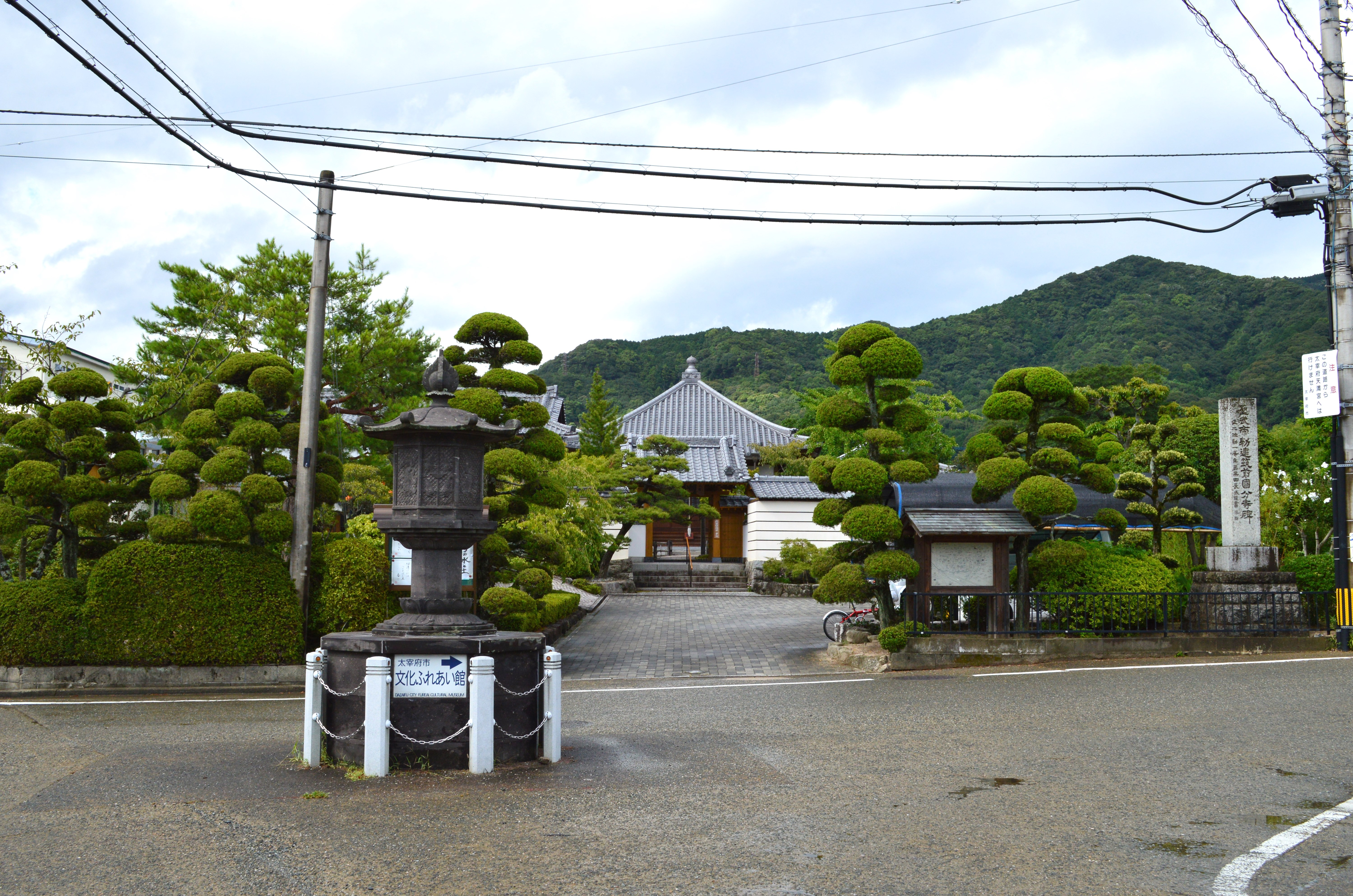
Entry to modern Chikuzen Kokubun-ji

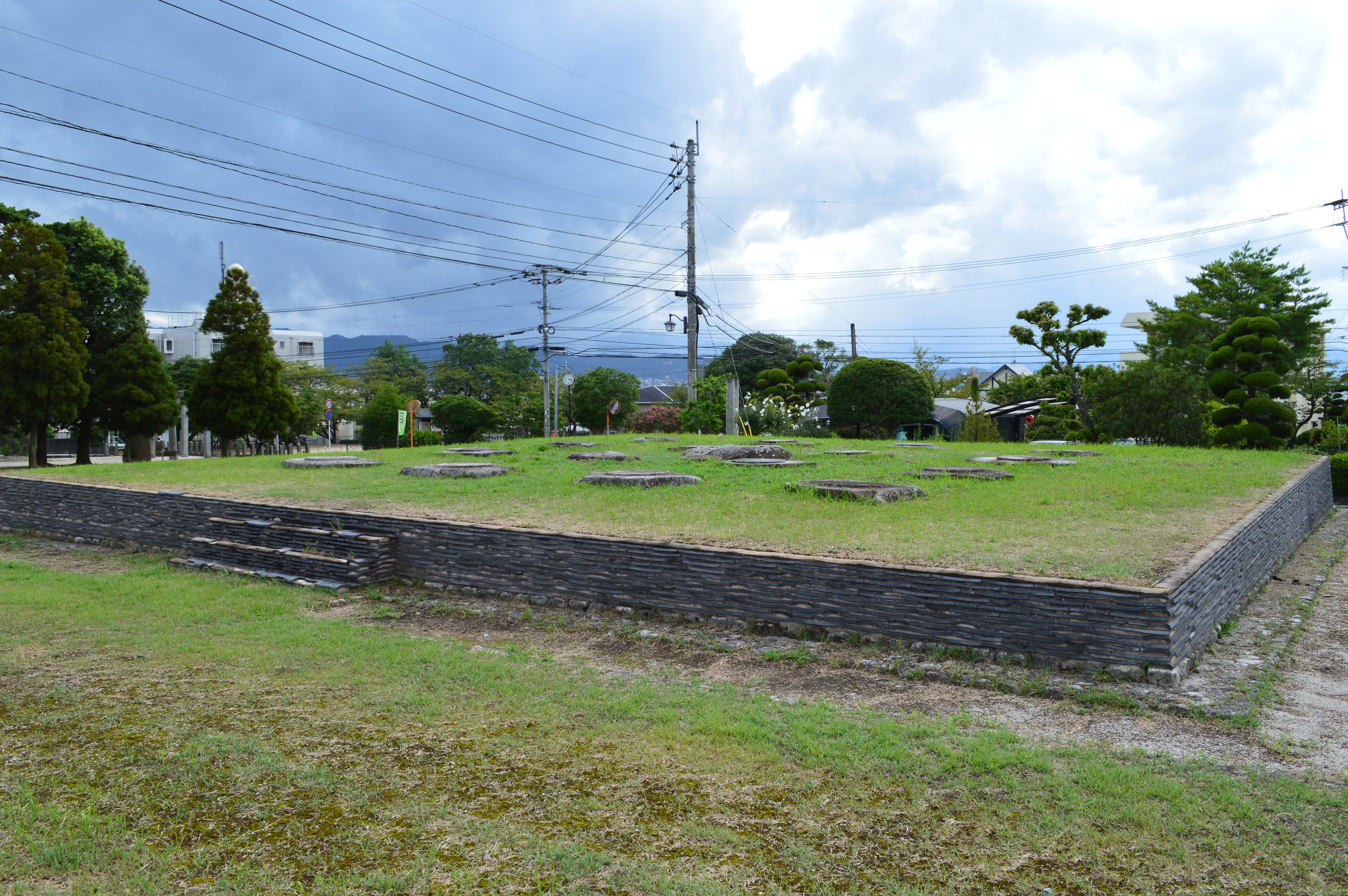
Foundations of the Pagoda

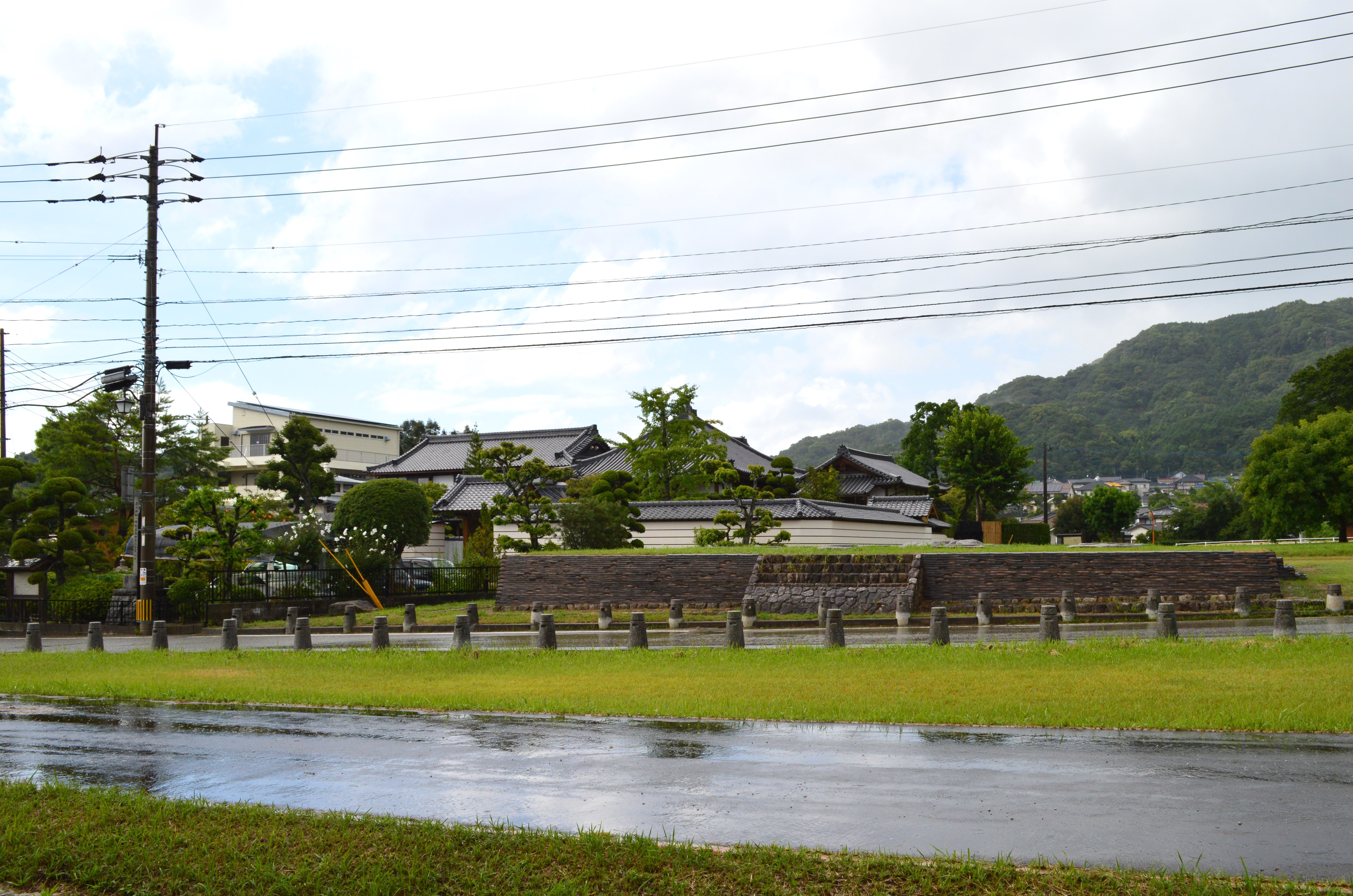
Panoramic view showing modern temple and ancient ruins

== Cultural Properties ==
=== Important Cultural Properties ===
- Wooden statue of seated Yakushi Nyorai (木造如来坐像（伝薬師如来坐像), Muromachi period

== Chikuzen Kokubun-niji ==
The site of the nunnery associated with the Chikuzen Kokubun-ji is estimated to be located approximately 100 meters west. Remains include the foundations of a post-hole building (presumably the south gate) and a ditch believed to be the eastern outer wall. One cornerstone believed to be from a central building has been moved to the Kokubun Common Use Facility to the south, and another remains in the garden in front of Dazaifu City Hall. Excavation results suggest that the nunnery dates to between the late 8th and late 9th centuries. In 2015, a piece of ink-inscribed earthenware with the inscription "Hanadera" (Flower Temple) was discovered, providing the first evidence of the nunnery's existence. Currently, the ruins are not part of the historical site.

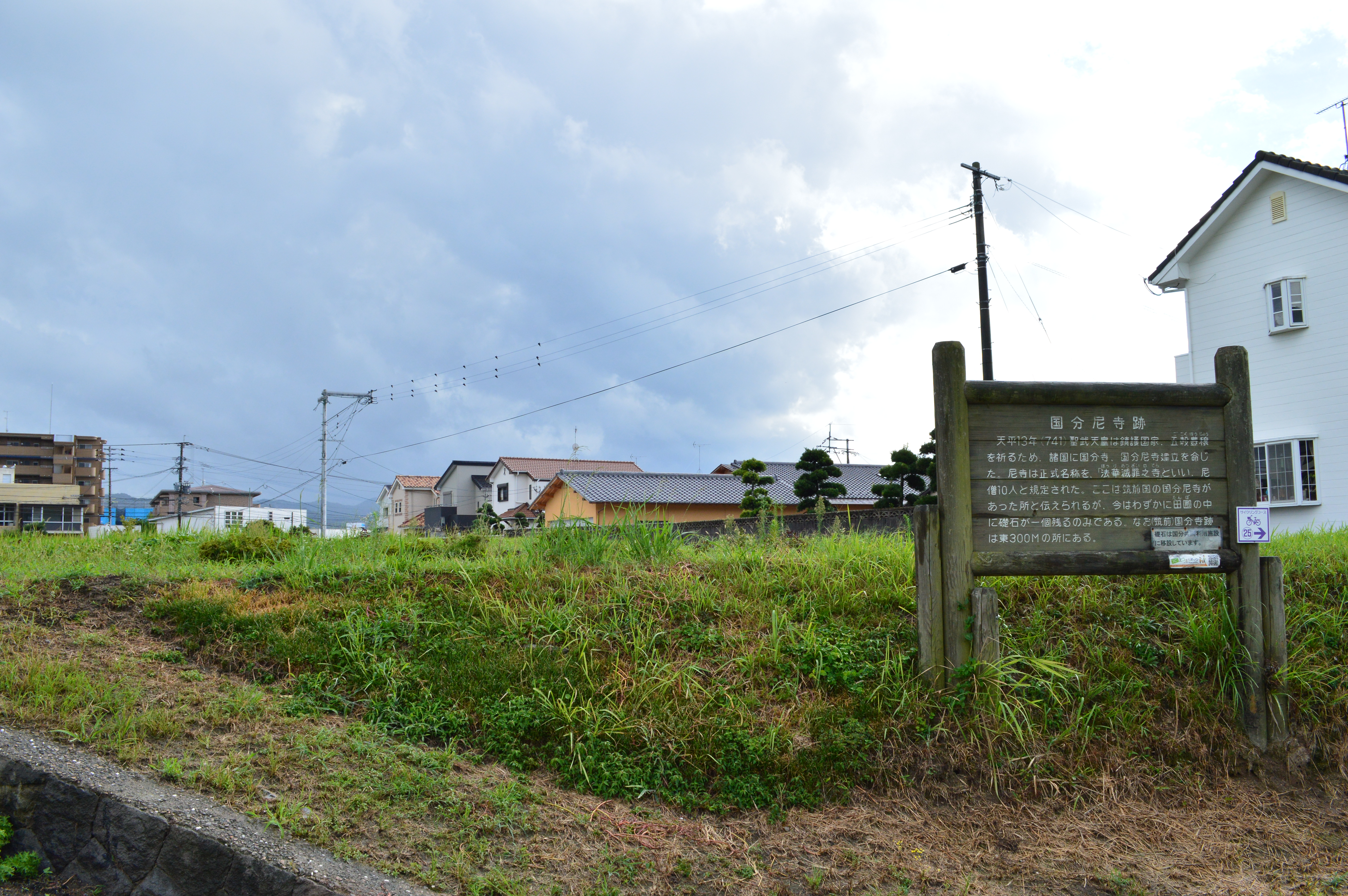
Site of Chikuzen Koubun-niji

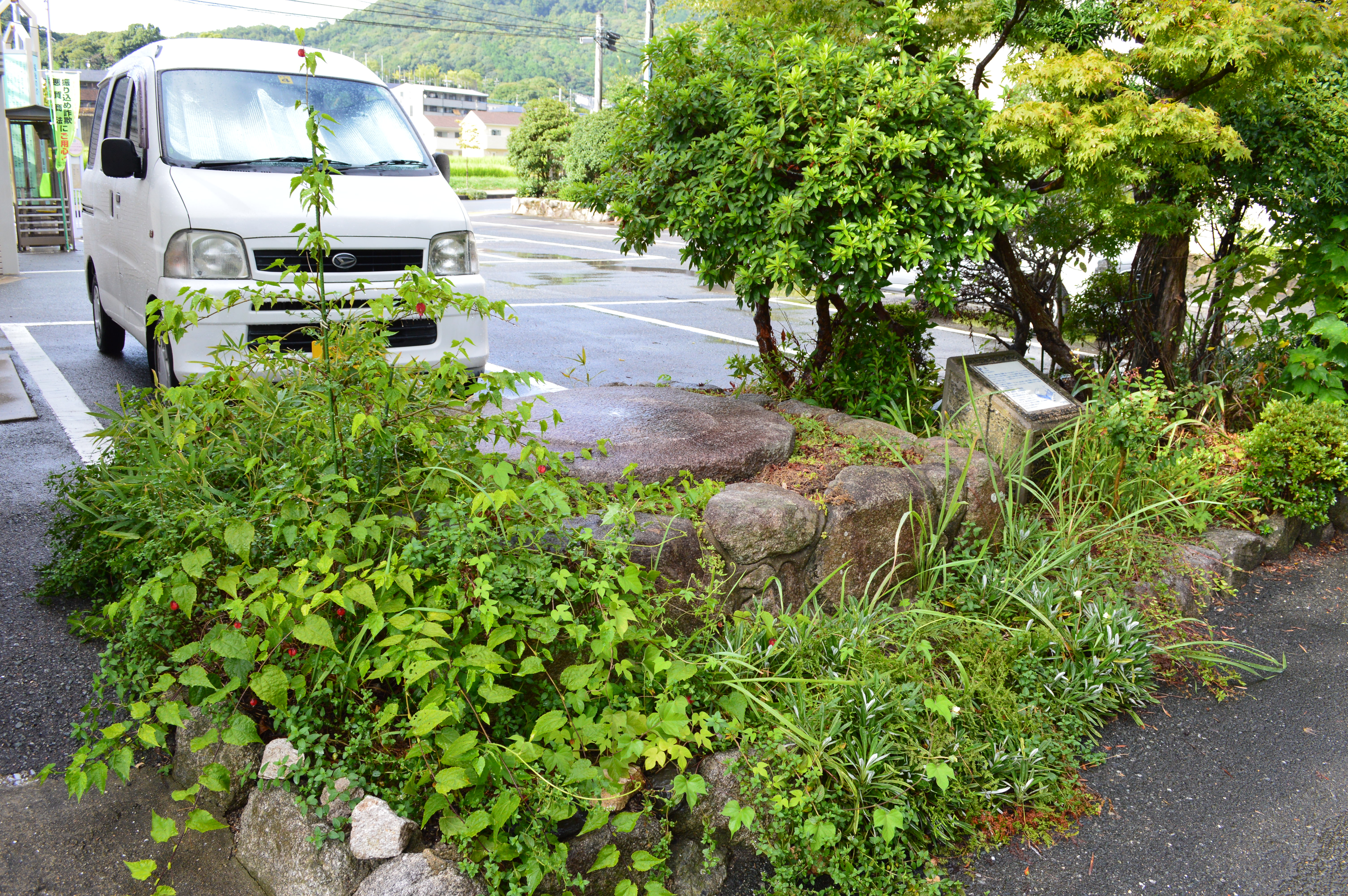
Cornerstone in front of the Kokubu Joint Use Facilit

== See also ==
- List of Historic Sites of Japan (Fukuoka)
- provincial temple
