= Aso Fukuoka Junior College =

Former junior college in Japan

- 麻生福岡短期大学
- Type: Junior College (private)
- Active: 1989–1999
- Location: Daizaifu City, Fukuoka Prefecture, Japan

Aso Fukuoka Junior College (麻生福岡短期大学, Aso Fukuoka Tanki Daigaku) was a junior college in Dazaifu, Fukuoka, Japan.

It was founded in 1989, moved administration to Kyushu Institute of Information Sciences in 1998, and closed in 1999.
