= Dazaifu, Fukuoka =

Dazaifu 太宰府市
- City
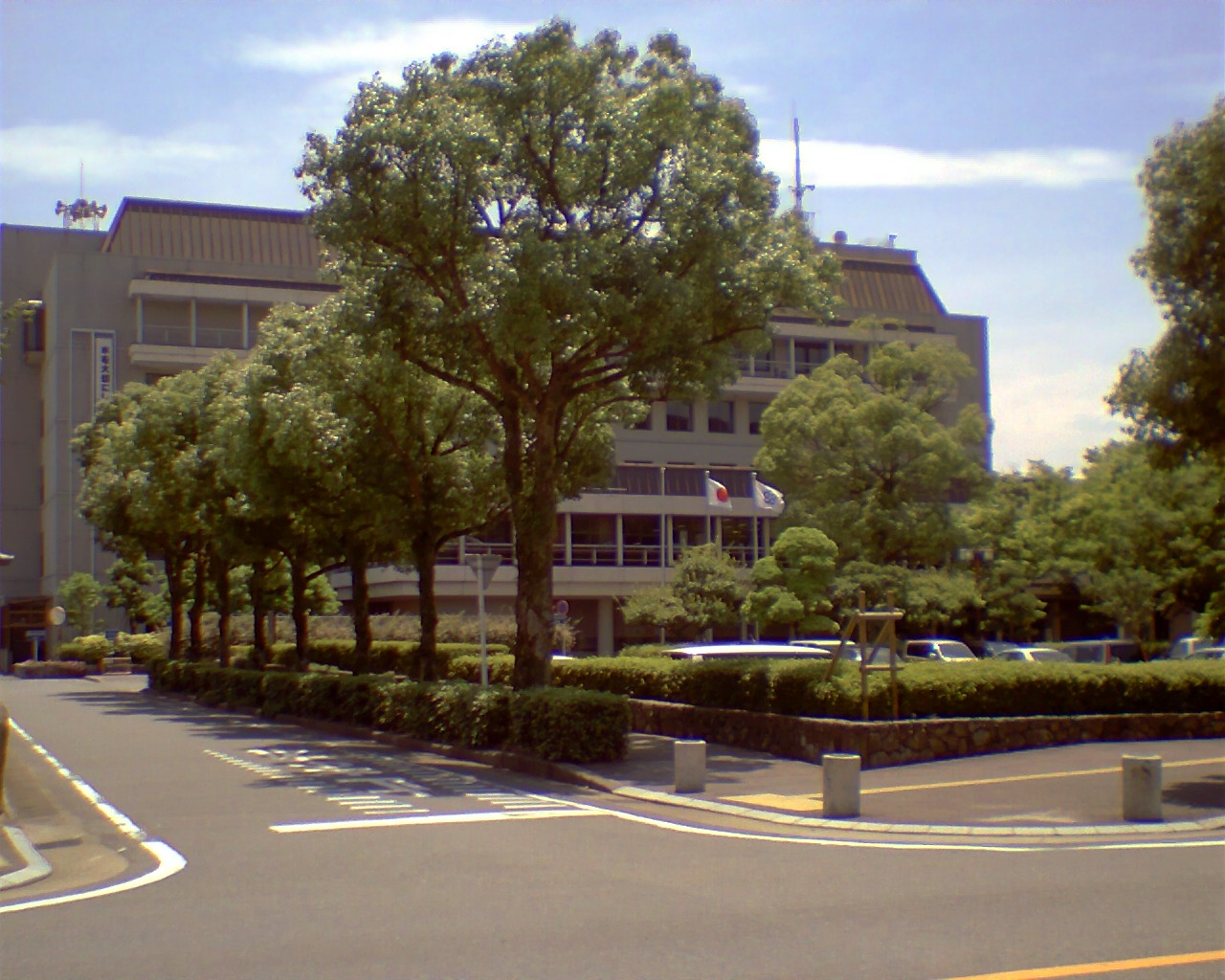
- Dazaifu City Hall

- Flag Emblem
- Interactive map of Dazaifu
- Location in Japan
- Coordinates: 33°30′46″N 130°31′26″E
- Country: Japan
- Region: Kyushu
- Prefecture: Fukuoka

Government
  - Mayor: Daizo Kushida

Area
  - Total: 29.60 km^{2} (11.43 sq mi)

Population (March 31, 2024)
  - Total: 71,505
  - Density: 2,416/km^{2} (6,257/sq mi)
- Time zone: UTC+09:00 (JST)
- City hall address: 1-1-1 Kanzeon-ji, Dazaifu-shi, Fukuoka-ken 818-0198
- Climate: Cfa
- Website: Official website
- Symbols
- Flower: Ume blossom
- Tree: Kusunoki

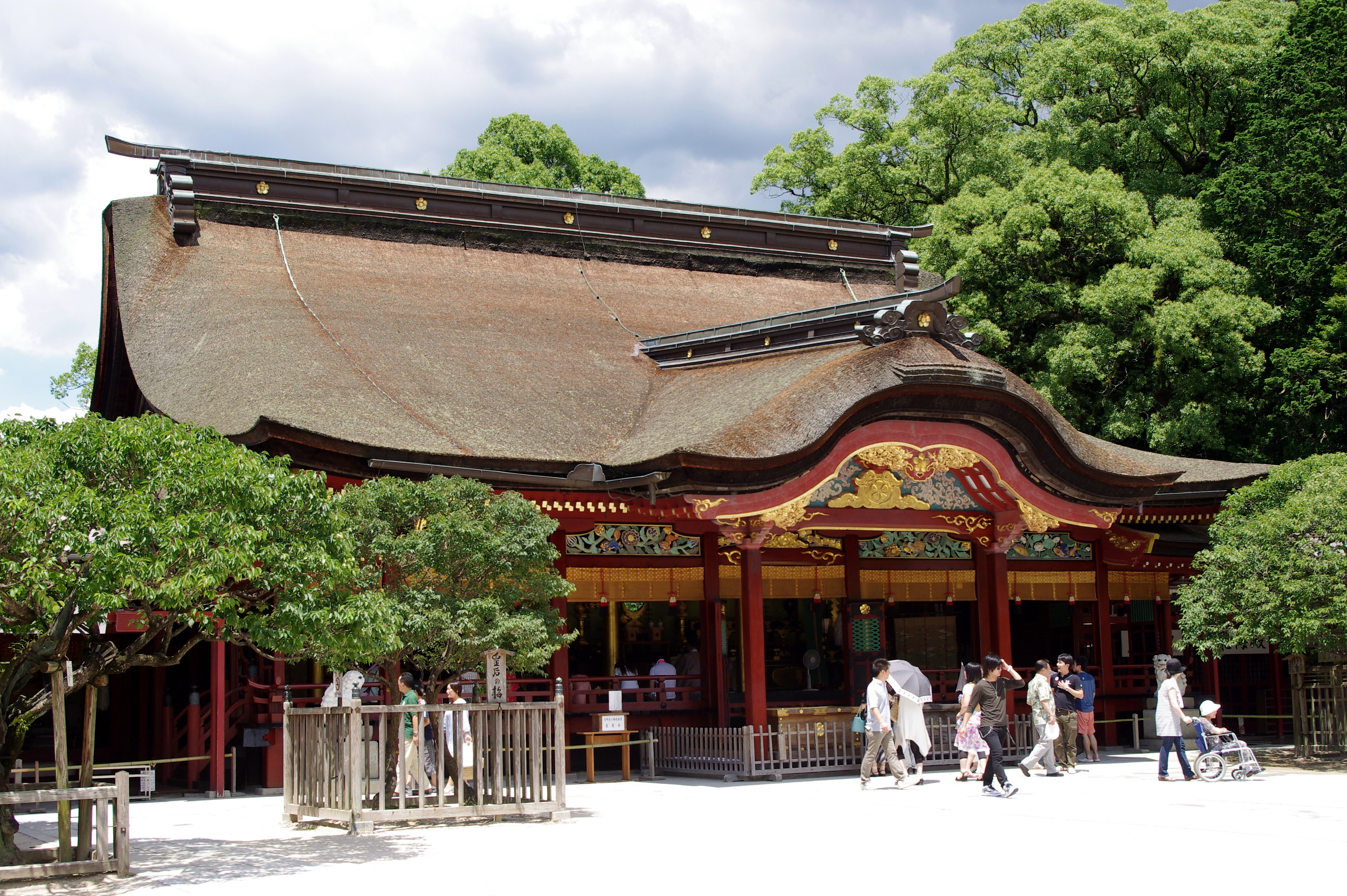
Dazaifu Tenman-gū

Dazaifu (太宰府市, Dazaifu-shi) is a city located in Fukuoka Prefecture, Japan. As of 31 March 2024, the city had an estimated population of 71,505 in 33204 households, and a population density of 260 persons per km^{2}. The total area of the city is 29.60 km^{2} (11.43 sq mi).

== Geography ==
Dazaifu is located in central Fukuoka Prefecture, approximately 16 kilometers southeast of Fukuoka City. The city is surrounded by Mount Shioji in the north, Mount Hōman in the east, and Mount Tenbai in the southwest; with the Mikasa River running through the center of the city. The central part of the city area has a well-developed central urban area, and there are many historical sites and famous places. The western and southern parts of the city are commuter towns for the Fukuoka metropolitan area.

=== Neighboring municipalities ===
Fukuoka Prefecture

- Chikushino
- Ōnojō
- Umi

=== Climate ===
Dazaifu has a humid subtropical climate (Köppen: Cfa). The average annual temperature in Dazaifu is 16.3 °C (61.3 °F). The average annual rainfall is 1,851.9 mm (72.91 in) with July as the wettest month. The temperatures are highest on average in August, at around 27.7 °C (81.9 °F), and lowest in January, at around 5.6 °C (42.1 °F). The highest temperature ever recorded in Dazaifu was 40.3 °C (104.5 °F) on 26 August 2026; the coldest temperature ever recorded was −5.6 °C (21.9 °F) on 25 January 2016.

Climate data for Dazaifu (1991−2020 normals, extremes 1977−present)
Month	Jan	Feb	Mar	Apr	May	Jun	Jul	Aug	Sep	Oct	Nov	Dec	Year
Record high °C (°F)	19.7 (67.5)	23.1 (73.6)	26.0 (78.8)	30.3 (86.5)	33.9 (93.0)	37.7 (99.9)	39.3 (102.7)	40.3 (104.5)	38.3 (100.9)	33.3 (91.9)	29.2 (84.6)	24.9 (76.8)	40.3 (104.5)
Mean daily maximum °C (°F)	9.7 (49.5)	11.1 (52.0)	14.7 (58.5)	20.0 (68.0)	24.9 (76.8)	27.6 (81.7)	31.2 (88.2)	32.5 (90.5)	28.7 (83.7)	23.7 (74.7)	17.8 (64.0)	12.0 (53.6)	21.2 (70.1)
Daily mean °C (°F)	5.6 (42.1)	6.6 (43.9)	9.8 (49.6)	14.6 (58.3)	19.4 (66.9)	23.0 (73.4)	26.8 (80.2)	27.7 (81.9)	23.9 (75.0)	18.4 (65.1)	12.8 (55.0)	7.6 (45.7)	16.4 (61.4)
Mean daily minimum °C (°F)	1.9 (35.4)	2.4 (36.3)	5.2 (41.4)	9.7 (49.5)	14.5 (58.1)	19.3 (66.7)	23.6 (74.5)	24.2 (75.6)	20.0 (68.0)	13.9 (57.0)	8.4 (47.1)	3.6 (38.5)	12.2 (54.0)
Record low °C (°F)	−5.6 (21.9)	−5.3 (22.5)	−4.0 (24.8)	−0.7 (30.7)	5.1 (41.2)	7.7 (45.9)	16.0 (60.8)	16.9 (62.4)	8.1 (46.6)	2.0 (35.6)	−0.5 (31.1)	−3.2 (26.2)	−5.6 (21.9)
Average precipitation mm (inches)	69.9 (2.75)	74.3 (2.93)	113.6 (4.47)	134.8 (5.31)	145.8 (5.74)	282.2 (11.11)	359.0 (14.13)	237.0 (9.33)	183.9 (7.24)	96.9 (3.81)	86.1 (3.39)	68.6 (2.70)	1,851.9 (72.91)
Average precipitation days (≥ 1.0 mm)	9.4	9.2	10.8	10.2	9.1	12.6	12.8	10.9	10.3	7.2	8.7	9.0	120.2
Mean monthly sunshine hours	105.0	118.8	155.1	179.5	190.9	122.8	141.4	174.2	151.8	168.9	136.9	107.1	1,752.3
Source: Japan Meteorological Agency

=== Demographics ===
Per Japanese census data, the population of Dazaifu in 2020 is 73,164 people. Dazaifu has been conducting censuses since 1920.

Historical population

Year	Pop.	±%
1920	7,190	—
1925	7,747	+7.7%
1930	8,138	+5.0%
1935	8,118	−0.2%
1940	8,486	+4.5%
1945	11,532	+35.9%
1950	11,972	+3.8%
1955	13,264	+10.8%
1960	13,913	+4.9%
1965	18,452	+32.6%
1970	26,155	+41.7%

Year	Pop.	±%
1975	36,553	+39.8%
1980	50,273	+37.5%
1985	57,737	+14.8%
1990	62,402	+8.1%
1995	64,913	+4.0%
2000	66,099	+1.8%
2005	67,087	+1.5%
2010	70,490	+5.1%
2015	72,168	+2.4%
2020	73,164	+1.4%

Dazaifu population statistics

== History ==
The area of Dazaifu was part of ancient Chikuzen Province and was the capital of ancient Tsukushi Province in the Kofun period. A fortified site that was the imperial office governing Kyūshū (corresponding to Tagajō in Tōhoku) was established in 663 AD, and the name "Dazaifu" first appears in the Nihon Shoki in 671 AD. According to the Taiho Code of 701, an attempt by the Yamato Kingdom to exert further control over its territories, Dazaifu was given two principal administrative functions: to supervise the affairs of Tsukushi (present-day Kyushu) and to receive foreign emissaries. Dazaifu hosted foreign embassies from Tang China and Korea. Kōrokan, a guesthouse for foreign embassies, was also established. The Korokan featured in contemporary literature, such as the Man'yōshū, as a place of departure for ocean voyages. Government records indicate that the disastrous Japanese smallpox epidemic that took place from 735 to 737 first took hold in Dazaifu. From the Nara period through the Heian period and until the Kamakura period, Dazaifu was one of the military and administrative centers of Japan. In the Heian period, Dazaifu was a place of exile for high-ranking courtiers. Nobles exiled there include Sugawara no Michizane. His grave is at Dazaifu Tenman-gū. The government offices were burned down during the rebellion of Fujiwara no Sumitomo in 941 and with the decline of imperial authority, Dazaifu never regained its earlier prestige. By the Muromachi period the political center of Kyūshū was moved to Hakata. The Shōni were later expelled by the Ōuchi clan. In the Edo period, Dazaifu was part of Fukuoka Domain.

After the Meiji restoration, the village of Dazaifu was established with the creation of the modern municipalities system on April 1, 1889. Dazaifu was raised to town status on March 1, 1955, and to city status on April 1, 1982.

== Government ==
Dazaifu has a mayor-council form of government with a directly elected mayor and a unicameral city council of 18 members. Dazaifu contributes two members to the Fukuoka Prefectural Assembly. In terms of national politics, the city is part of the Fukuoka 5th district of the lower house of the Diet of Japan.

== Economy ==
Although mostly mountainous, Daizaifu does have arable land used for paddy fields and market gardening. However, tourism is the mainstay of the local economy, due to many historical sites. Dazaifu is also a "college town" with many students at its colleges and universities.

== Education ==
=== Colleges and universities ===
- Chikushi Jogakuen University
- Fukuoka International University
- Fukuoka University of Economics
- Fukuoka Social Medical Welfare University
- Fukuoka Junior College for Kindergarten Teachers
- Fukuoka Women's Junior College
- Aso Fukuoka Junior College (1989–1999)

=== Primary and secondary education ===
Dazaifu has seven public elementary schools and four public junior high schools and two public high schools operated by the Fukuoka Prefectural Board of Education. There are also one private elementary, one private junior high and two private high schools.

== Transportation ==
=== Railways ===
JR Kyushu - Kagoshima Main Line

JB Tofurōminami

Nishitetsu - Tenjin Ōmuta Line

■ Tofurōmae

Nishitetsu - Dazaifu Line

■ Nishitetsu Gojō - Dazaifu

=== Highways ===
- Kyushu Expressway
- National Route 3

== Sister cities ==
- Buyeo County, South Korea

== Local attractions ==
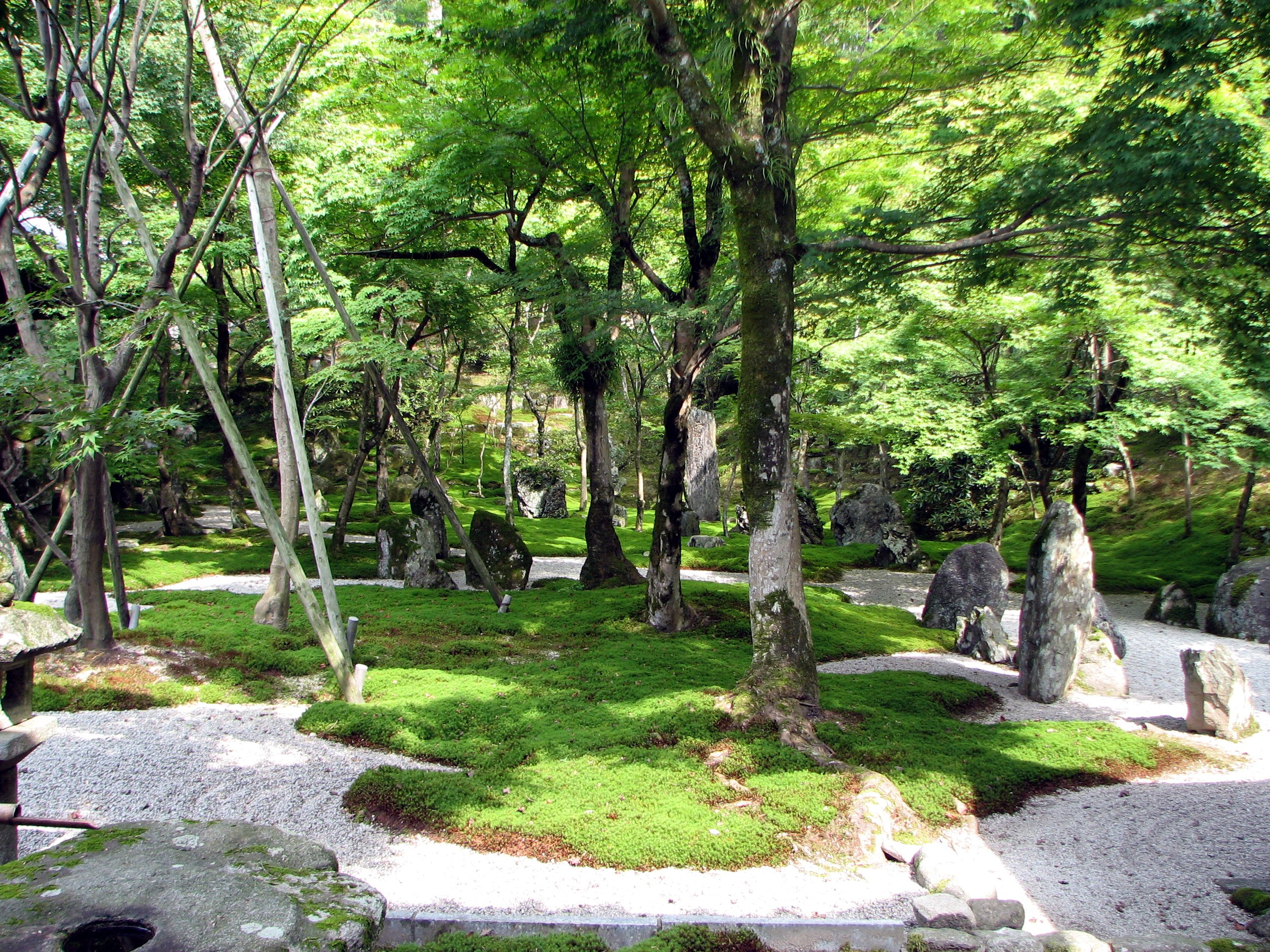
Stone garden at Kōmyōzen-ji

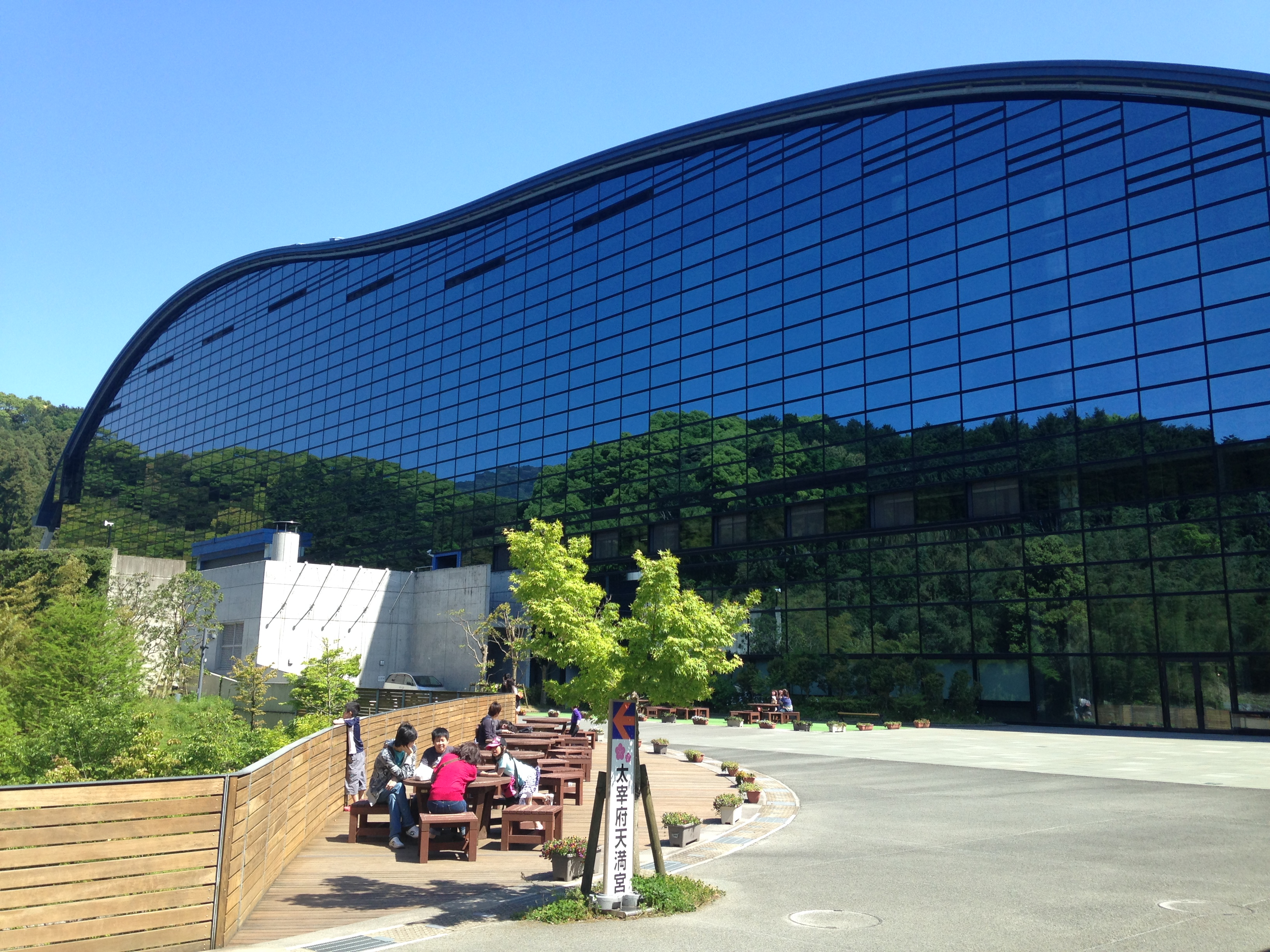
Kyushu National Museum

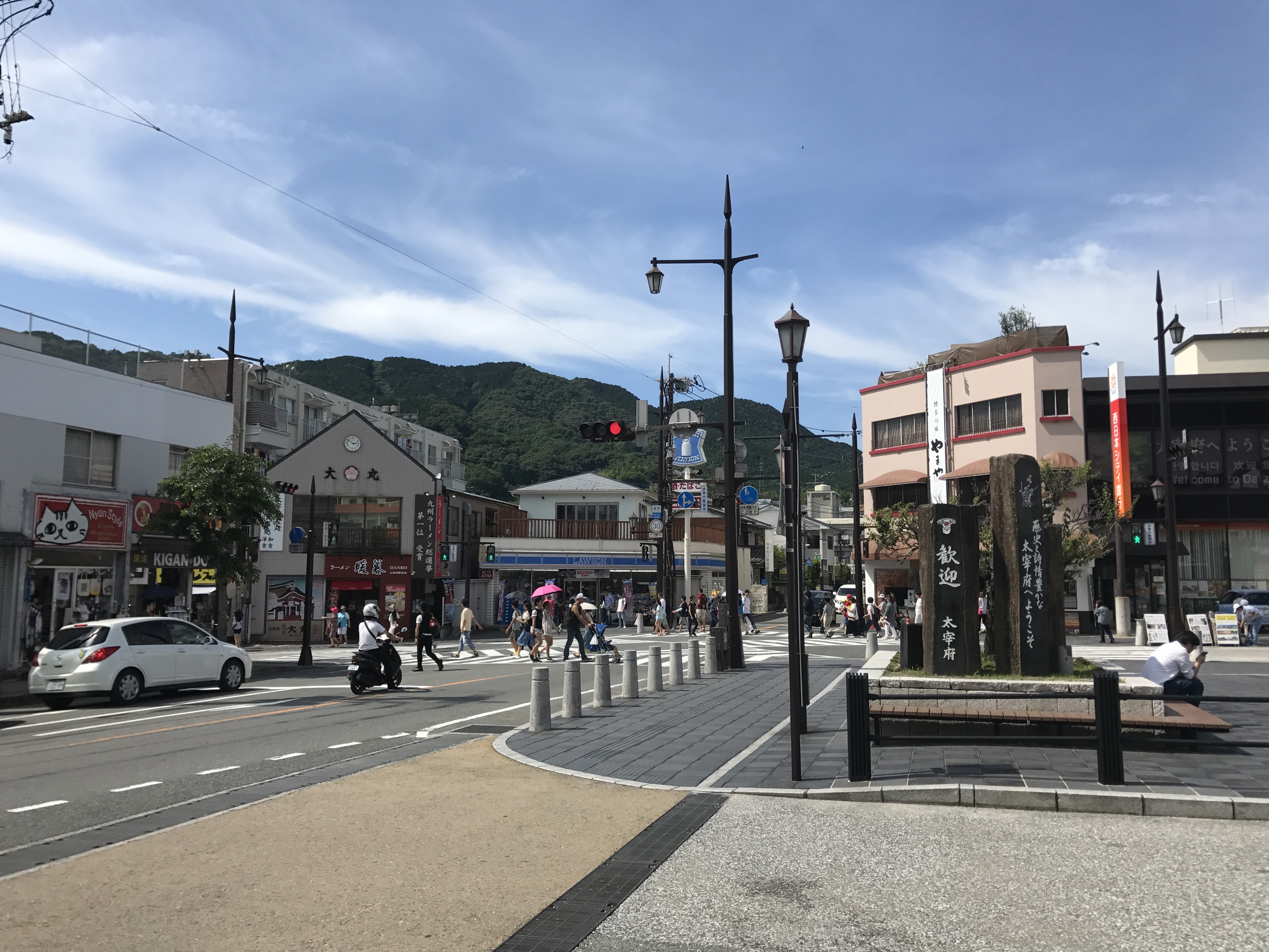
View in front of Dazaifu Station

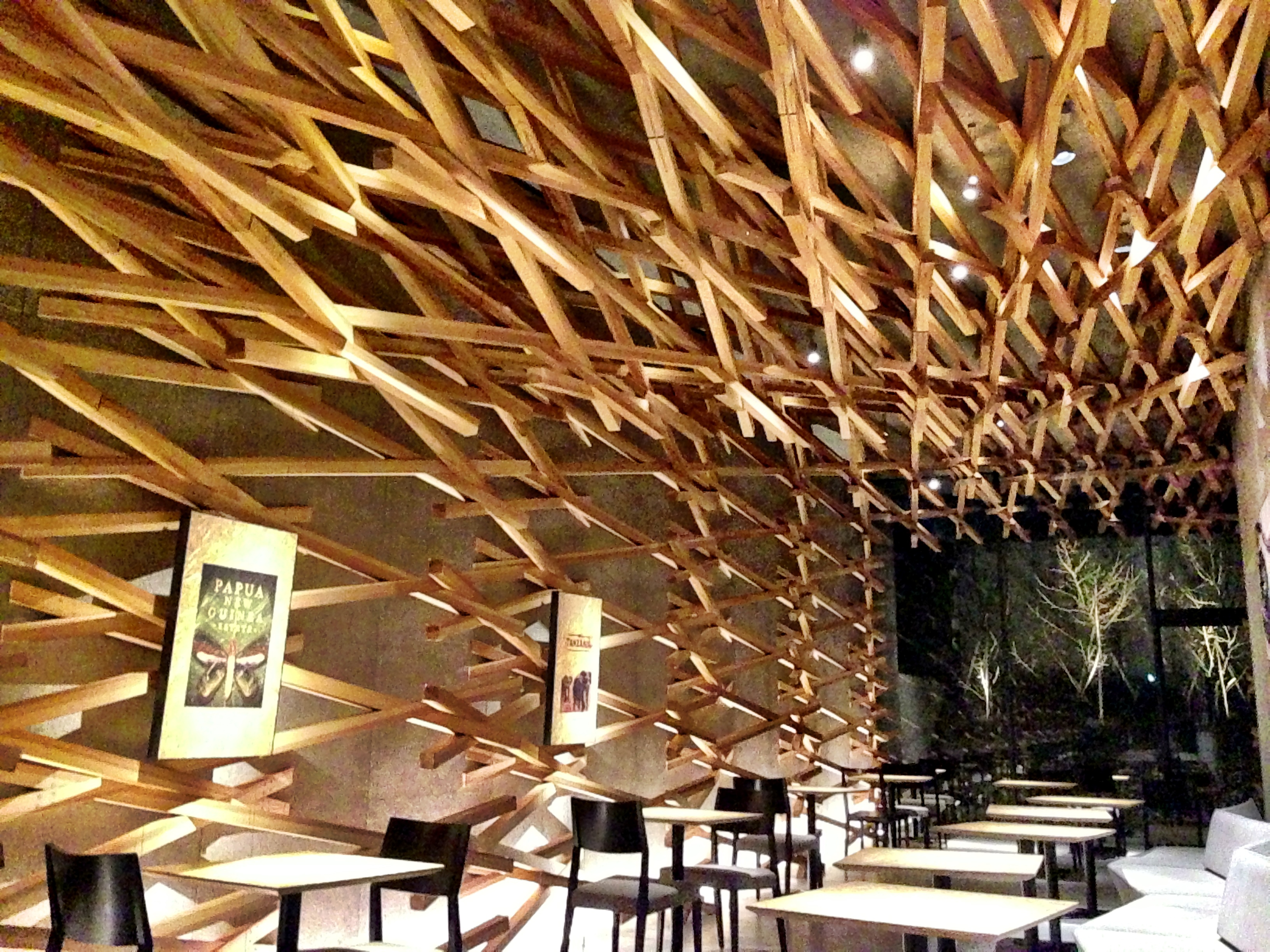
Kengo Kuma-designed Starbucks coffee shop

- Kyushu National Museum opened on October 16, 2005. A wood and glass building in a hilly landscape, it hosts collections of Japanese artifacts related to the history of Kyūshū.
- Dazaifu Tenmangū, famed Shinto shrine
- Dazaifu Gakkōin Site, National Historic Site
- Kōmyōzen-ji is a Zen temple famous for its stone garden. It was built during the Kamakura period just next to Dazaifu Tenmangū
- Kanzeon-ji, was built in the 8th century. It was once the chief Buddhist temple on Kyūshū and houses a number of historical, artistic, and religious treasures.
- Dazaifu (government) ruins, National Historic Site
- Chikuzen Kokubun-ji ruins, National Historic Site
- There is small museum about Sugawara no Michizane, who died in exile in Dazaifu in 903.

The Starbucks coffeeshop in Dazaifu has a unique design by Kengo Kuma.

== See also ==
- Dazaifu (government)
