= Kanzeon-ji =

7th-century Buddhist temple in Fukuoka, Japan

- 観世音寺
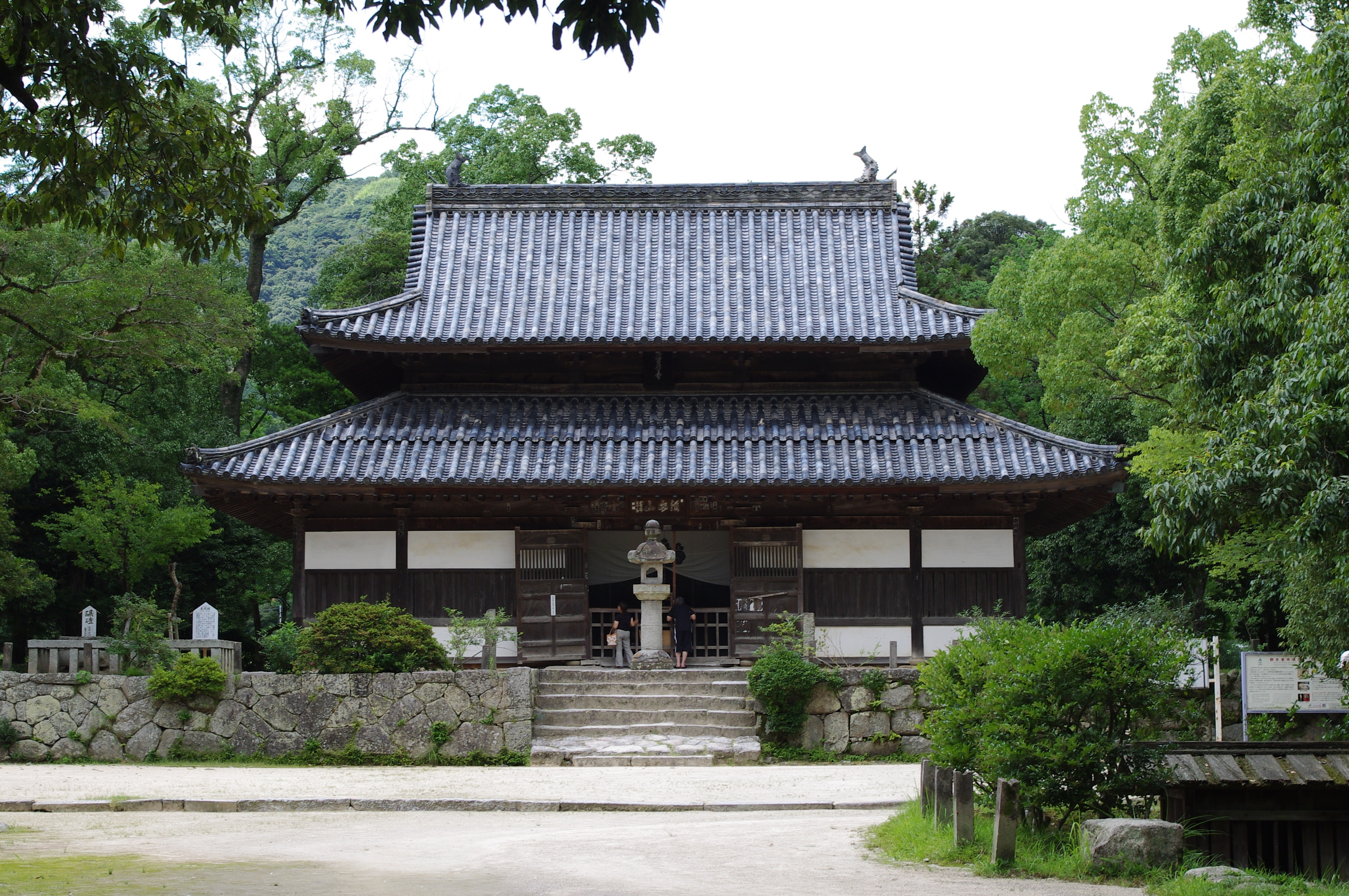
- Lecture Hall (Fukuoka ICP)

- Location within Fukuoka Prefecture Location within Japan

Religion
- Affiliation: Buddhist
- Deity: Sho-Kannon Bosatsu (Āryāvalokiteśvara)
- Rite: Tendai
- Status: functional

Location
- Location: 5-6-1 Kanzeonji, Dazaifu-shi, Fukuoka-ken 818-0101
- Country: Japan
- Coordinates: 33°30′54.1″N 130°31′16.7″E

Architecture
- Founder: Emperor Tenji
- Completed: c.746

Website
- Official website
- National Treasure Important Cultural Property National Historic Site of Japan

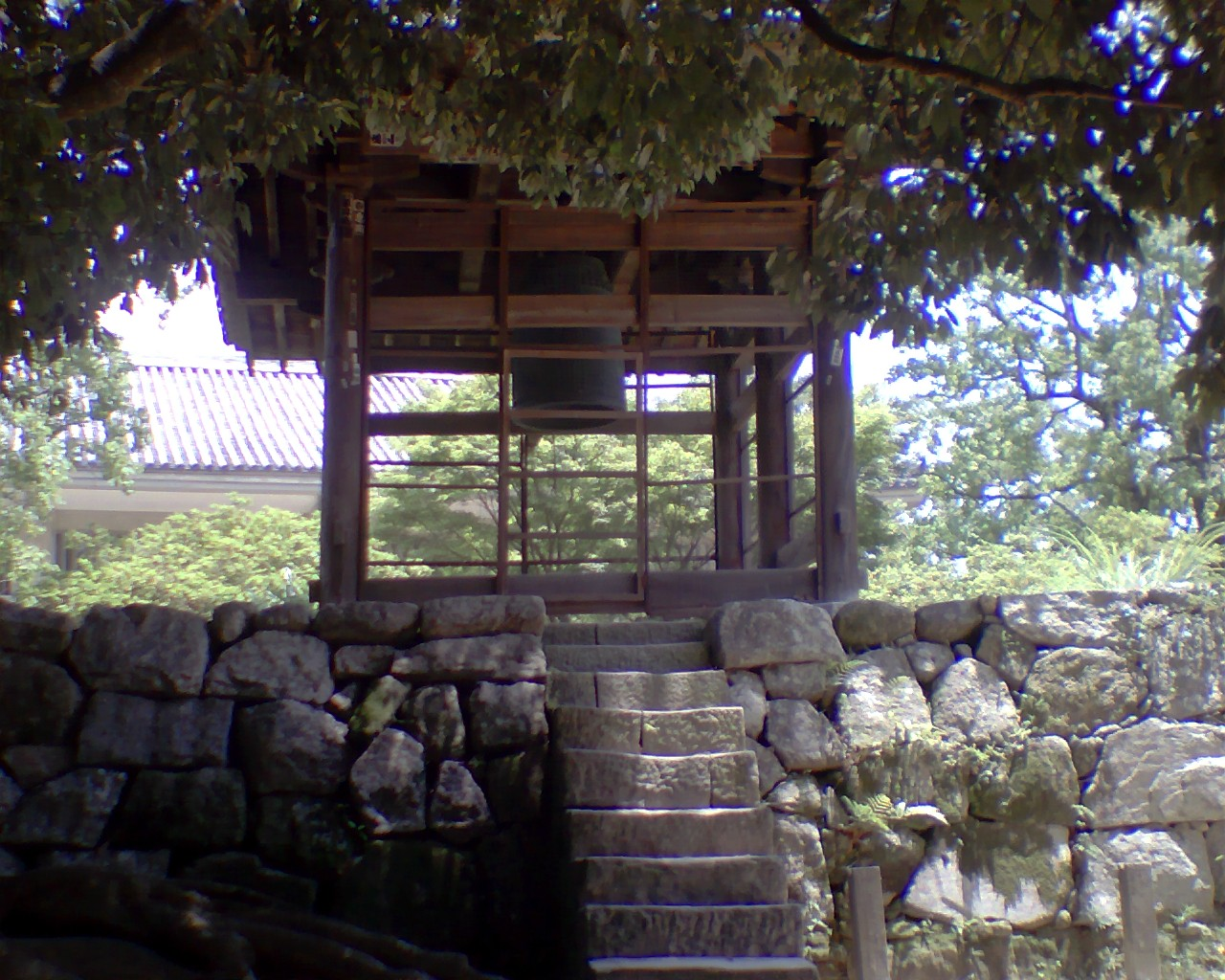
Kanzeon-ji's Asuka period bell, a National Treasure

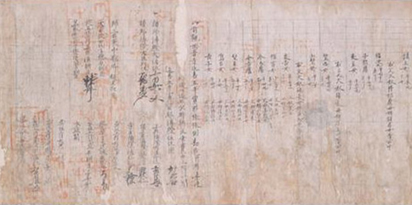
Inventory of Kanzeon-ji from 905, now in Tokyo; a National Treasure

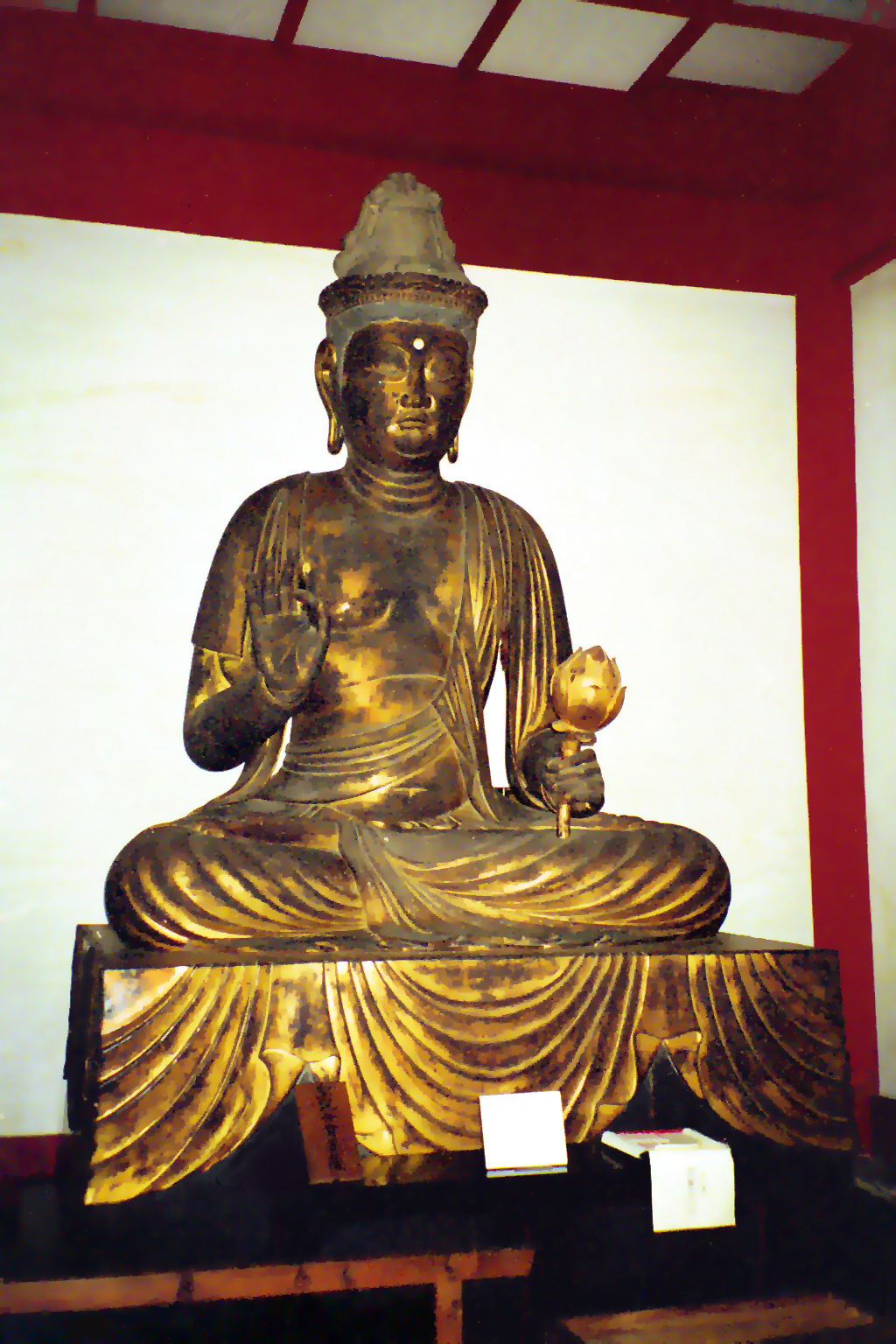
Avalokiteśvara

Kanzeon-ji (観世音寺) is a seventh-century Buddhist temple in Dazaifu, Fukuoka, Fukuoka Prefecture, Japan. It was once the most important temple in Kyushu. Its bell, one of the oldest in the country, has been designated a National Treasure, and in 1996 the Ministry of the Environment designated its sound as one of the 100 Soundscapes of Japan. Many of its statues from the Heian period are Important Cultural Properties.

== History ==
The origins of Kanzeon-ji are uncertain, and its oldest known appearance in historical documentation is in the Kanzeon-ji Zaizaicho (National Treasure, owned by Tokyo University of the Arts), compiled in 905. According to the Shoku Nihongi, Kanzeon-ji was founded by Emperor Tenji in honour of his mother Empress Saimei. As she died in 661, it is assumed that construction began shortly thereafter; however, it was still incomplete fifty years later when additional workers were assigned in 709. A further entry in the Shoku Nihongi indicates that it was completed in 746. The oldest roof tiles excavated from the temple grounds date to the 7th century and have patterns of double-valved, eight-petaled lotus-shaped eaves and eccentric arabesque patterns also found in Fujiwara-kyō and Kawara-dera in Asuka, Nara. The bonshō bell at Kanzeon-ji was cast using the same wooden mold as the bell at Myōshin-ji in Kyoto, which has the date inscription of 698.

All of the original structures of Kanzeon-ji have been lost and rebuilt repeatedly due to fires and other disasters. Excavation has revealed that the original layout of the temple was patterned after Kawara-dera, with a south gate, middle gate, Kondō (Main Hall) to the west, pagoda to the east, and a lecture hall in the centre, with a cloister. In 761, the monk Ganjin constructed a Kaidan-in, which permitted monks trained at this temple to be fully ordained without having to travel all the way to the capital. In 1064, a fire destroyed the lecture hall and pagoda. In 1102, the Kondō, South Gate, and other buildings collapsed due to a strong wind. The Kondō was later restored, but it was destroyed again in a fire in 1143. The temple went into decline in the Muromachi and Sengoku periods, and by 1630, its only remaining main hall collapsed during a rainstorm, and Kanzeon-ji was reduced to an abandoned temple.

In 1631, a new Kondō was built under the sponsorship of the Kuroda clan of Fukuoka Domain. The Kondō and lecture hall were rebuilt in the Genroku era (1688–1703). These structures are now designated Fukuoka Prefectural Tangible Cultural Properties. From 1913 to 1914, repairs were made to the badly damaged Buddha statues. In 1959, the reinforced concrete treasure house was completed. This was one of the earliest temple cultural property repositories built.

The grounds and ruins of Kanzeon-ji (観世音寺境内及び子院跡) were declared a National Historic Site in 1970.

== Cultural Properties ==
=== National Treasure ===
- Bonshō bell (梵鐘) of the Nara period (698); designated a National Treasure in 1953

=== National Important Cultural Properties ===
- Wooden statue of seated Amida Nyorai (木造阿弥陀如来坐像), Heian period
- Wooden statue of standing Amida Nyorai (木造阿弥陀如来立像), Heian period
- Wooden statue of seated Kannon Bosatsu (木造観音菩薩坐像), Heian period (1066)
- Wooden statue of standing Kannon Bosatsu (木造観音菩薩立像), Heian period
- Wooden statue of standing Kannon Bosatsu (木造観音菩薩立像), Heian period
- Wooden statue of standing Kichijōten (木造吉祥天立像), Heian period
- Wooden statues of standing Shitennō (木造四天王立像), Heian period
- Wooden statue of standing Jūichimen Kannon (木造十一面観音立像), Heian period
- Wooden statue of standing Jūichimen Kannon (木造十一面観音立像), Heian period (1069)
- Wooden statue of Jūichimen Kannon (木造十一面観音立像), Kamakura period (1242)
- Wooden statue of standing Daikoku-ten (木造大黒天立像), Heian period
- Wooden statue of half-seated Jizō Bosatsu (木造地蔵菩薩半跏像) of the Heian period
- Wooden statue of standing Jizō Bosatsu (木造地蔵菩薩立像), Heian period
- Wooden statue of standing Batō Kannon (木造馬頭観音立像), Heian period
- Wooden statue of standing Bishamonten (木造毘沙門天立像), Heian period
- Wooden statue of standing Fukūkenjaku Kannon (木造不空羂索観音立像), Kamakura period (1222)
- Wooden bugaku masks (木造舞楽面) Kamakura period, set of 3
- stone statues of Komainu (石造狛犬), Kamakura period
- Bronze mirror (銅製天蓋光心), Nara period

=== Fukuoka Prefecture Designated Tangible Cultural Properties ===
- Kondō and Kōdō (金堂及び講堂), Edo period (1688); The Kōdō is the central building of Kanzeon-ji, used for lectures and Buddhist ceremonies. It has a gabled roof, a tiled roof, three bays, two beams, and a soffit on all four sides. The Kondo was originally built in 1630 as a temporary lecture hall, and was later rebuilt as the main hall when the Kōdō was rebuilt. The temple is a gabled building with a tiled roof, 5 bays across, and 4 bays deep. The Buddhist statues that were enshrined in the lecture hall and main hall are now stored and open to the public in the treasure house within the temple grounds.

A Heian period inventory of Kanzeon-ji (観世音寺資財帳) dating to 905 and now in Tokyo has been designated a National Treasure.

== See also ==
- Dazaifu Tenman-gū
- Kaidan-in
- Kōmyōzen-ji
- List of National Treasures of Japan (ancient documents)
- List of National Treasures of Japan (crafts: others)
- List of Special Places of Scenic Beauty, Special Historic Sites and Special Natural Monuments
- 100 Soundscapes of Japan
