= 失楽園 =

失楽園 or 失樂園, meaning 'Lost Paradise', may refer to:

- A Lost Paradise, Japanese novel by author Junichi Watanabe
  - Lost Paradise, Japanese film
- Paradise Lost, an album by Sarah Chen
- Shitsurakuen, Japanese manga
- That Burning House, Taiwanese film starring Tseng Jing-hua

== See also ==
- Lost Paradise (disambiguation)
- Paradise Lost (disambiguation)
