= Sekijin sekiba =

Type of Japanese archaeological artefact

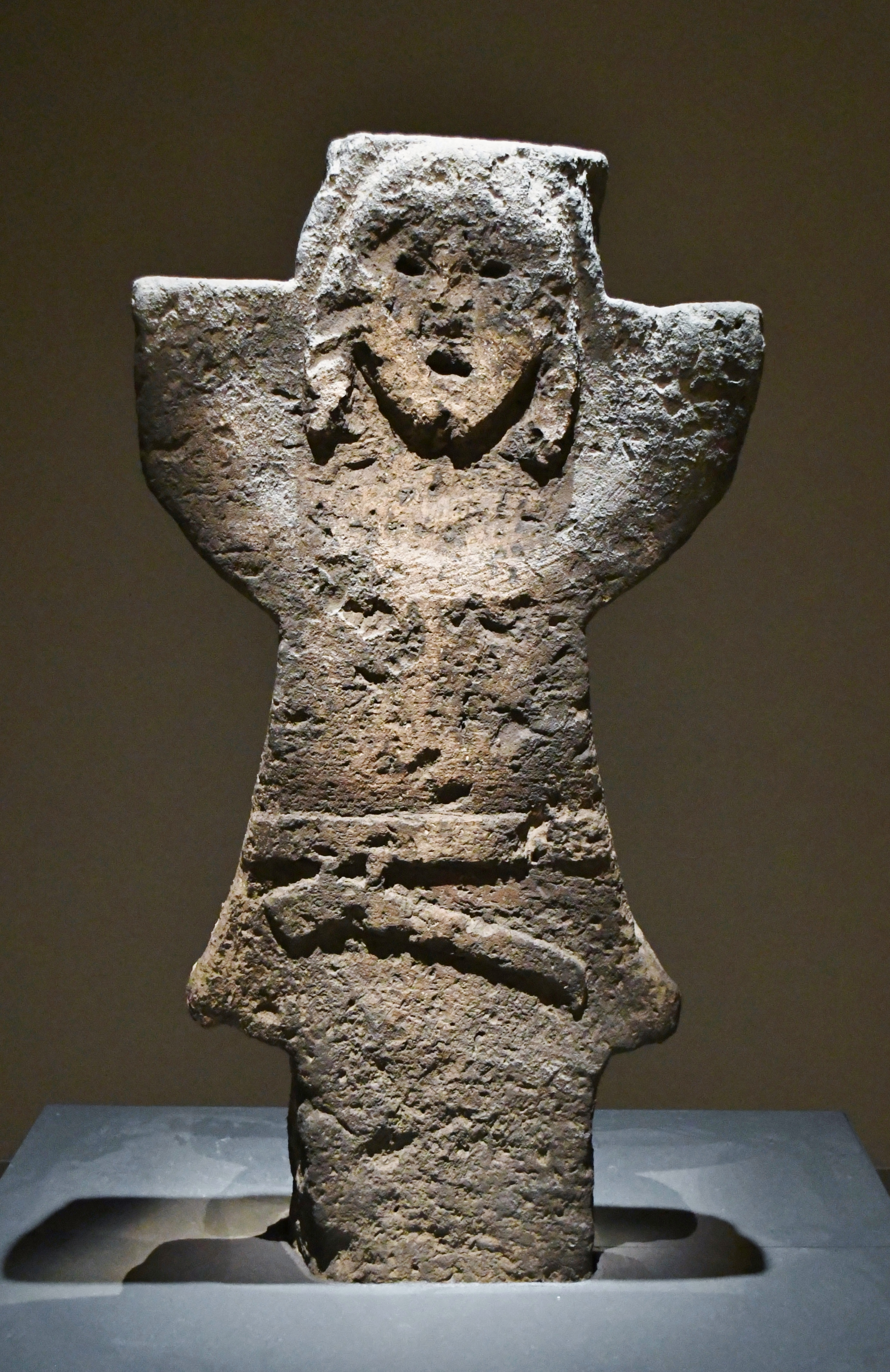
6th-century sekijin (ICP) from Iwatoyama Kofun, Fukuoka Prefecture (Tokyo National Museum)

Sekijin sekiba (Japanese: 石人石馬) is the inclusive term for sculptures in stone from the ancient burial mounds of Kofun-period Japan. It includes not only the stone figures of humans and horses denoted by the kanji, but also depictions of other animals and objects. For this reason, these sculptures are sometimes referred to alternatively as sekisei hyōshoku (石製表飾).

== Overview ==
Sekijin sekiba are found mainly in northern and central Kyūshū (Chikugo, Higo, and Bungo) and date from the mid- to late-Kofun period (C5–C6). Ranging in height from around 2 metres (6 ft 7 in) to 30 centimetres (12 in), they are understood to have been erected in front of the stone coffin or on top of kofun together with or in place of clay haniwa. These may have influenced their development—as did, in all likelihood, the statues lining the spirit paths of tombs in China. More than a hundred are known from Iwatoyama Kofun in Yame, Fukuoka Prefecture, and sixteen from Hime-no-jō Kofun in Kumamoto Prefecture; elsewhere, they are found singly or in low numbers. Most are carved from ignimbrite from Mount Aso, though an example from Yonago in western Honshū is of andesite from Mount Daisen. Some retain traces of red and green pigments.

Over forty examples had been catalogued by the early 1900s and in 1929 archaeologist Morimoto Rokuji published his monograph Sekijin Sekiba. Suggestions as to their function include propitiation of the spirits of the dead, comforting the same through the accompaniment of familiar figures and things, protection of the tomb and the symbolic punishment of robbers, and, in the case of Iwatoyama Kofun with its "sixty stone men and sixty stone shields" 「石人石盾各々六〇枚」 per Chikugo Fudoki, the expression of power. Perhaps for this reason, after the Iwai Rebellion they appear to have declined somewhat in popularity, perhaps supplanted in part by the paintings of the so-called decorated kofun.

== Types ==
Sekijin sekiba include sculptures of men, many of them armed, and, less commonly, women, in one instance with a child on her back; animals, including horses, boar, chickens, and waterfowl; tankō and other armour, shields, swords, quivers, headpieces, vases, lids, a house, a chair, and a boat.

== Distribution ==
Sekijin sekiba are known from over twenty-five sites, all but one of them in Kyūshū, the exception being Ishiumadani Kofun in Yonago, Tottori Prefecture. Within Kyūshū, all but four are in the prefectures of Fukuoka and Kumamoto, two being in Ōita (Shimoyama Kofun and Usuzuka Kofun in Usuki), with Saga (Nishihara Kofun in Saga) and Miyazaki (Nobeoka) having one apiece. Of the ten sites in Fukuoka Prefecture, there is a concentration in Yame (Iwatoyama Kofun, Noriba Kofun, Tsurumiyama Kofun, Dōnanzan No. 3 Kofun, Dōnanzan No. 22 Kofun, Toyofuku), the others being in Hirokawa (Sekijinsan Kofun), Kurume (Ontsuka Kofun), Miyama (Sekijinsan Kofun), and Ōmuta. The eleven sites in Kumamoto are in Arao (Sannomiya Kofun (三の宮古墳)), Hikawa (Amazutsu Kofun and Hime-no-jō Kofun), Kikuchi (Futatsukasan Kofun (フタツカサン古墳) and Onozaki), Kumamoto (Ishinomuro Kofun (石之室古墳)), Tominoo Kofun (富ノ尾古墳), and Kitahara No. 1 Kofun), Nagomi (Eta Funayama Kofun), and Yamaga (Chibusan Kofun and Usuzuka Kofun).

== Important Cultural Properties ==
Several sekijin sekiba have been designated Important Cultural Properties:

- Sekijin (stone man) from Iwatoyama Kofun, Fukuoka Prefecture (Tokyo National Museum)
- Armed sekijin from Sekijinsan Kofun (Hirokawa), Fukuoka Prefecture
- Armed sekijin from Sekijinsan Kofun (Miyama), Fukuoka Prefecture
- Armed sekijin from Tsurumiyama Kofun, Fukuoka Prefecture (Iwatoyama Historical and Cultural Community Center)
- 62 pieces from Iwatoyama Kofun, Fukuoka Prefecture (Iwatoyama Historical and Cultural Community Center)
- Sekiba (stone horse) from Ishiumadani Kofun in Yonago, Tottori Prefecture (Amenokamigaki Jinja)

== Gallery ==
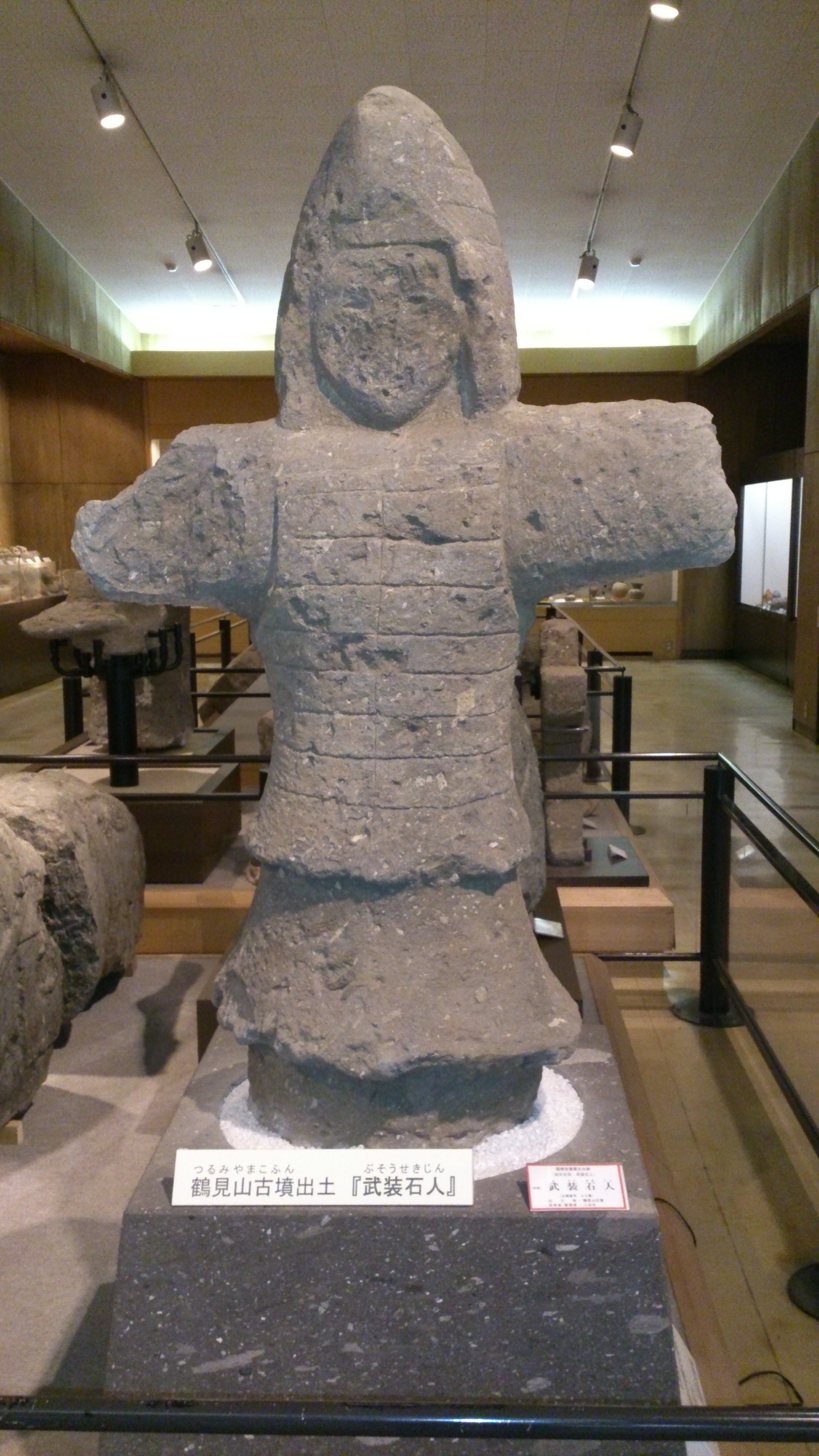
Sekijin (stone man) from Tsurumiyama Kofun, Fukuoka Prefecture

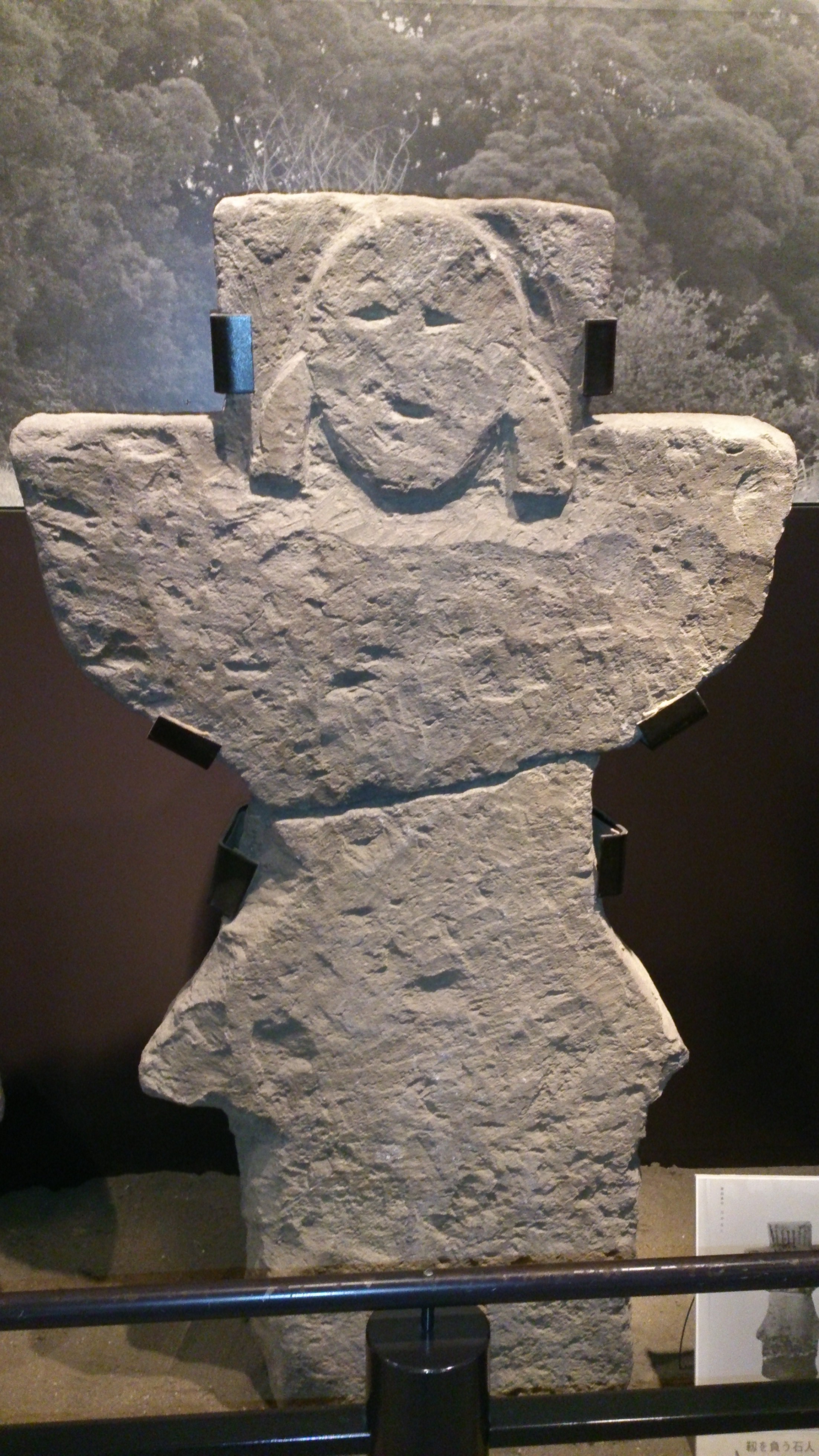
Sekijin from Iwatoyama Kofun, Fukuoka Prefecture

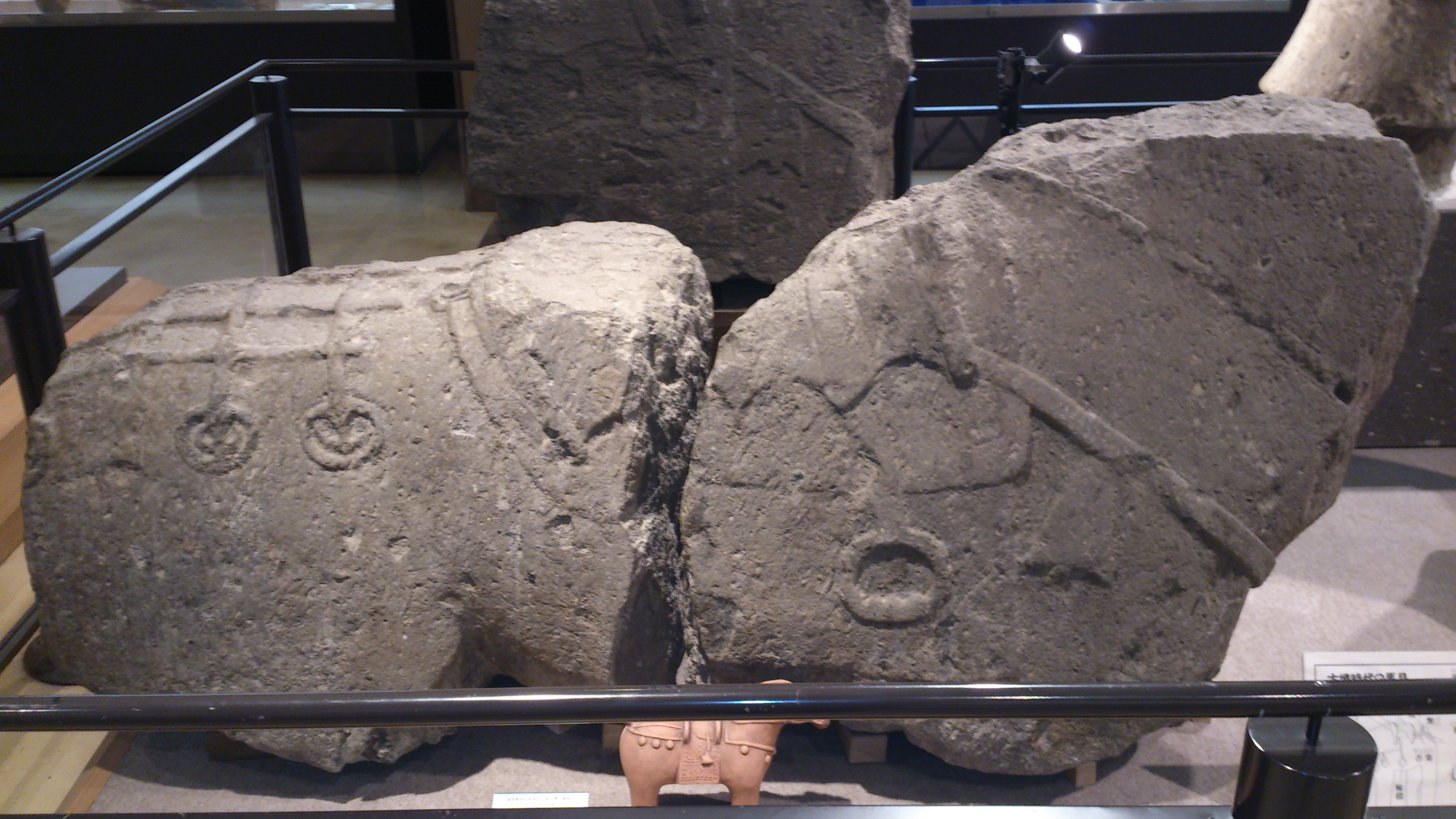
Sekiba (stone horse) from Iwatoyama Kofun, Fukuoka Prefecture

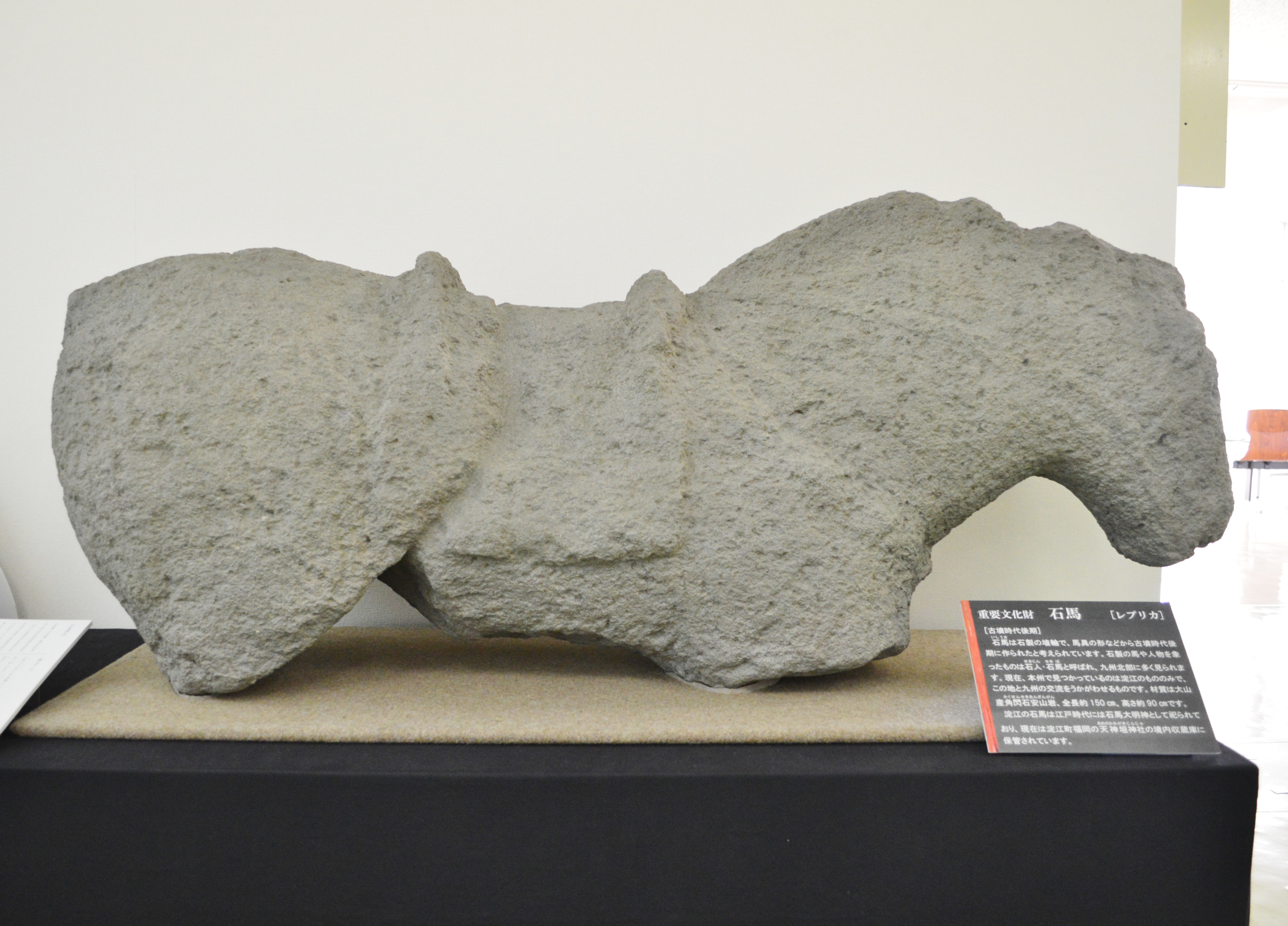
Sekiba (replica) from Ishiumadani Kofun, Tottori Prefecture (Kamiyodo Hakuhō-no-Oka Exhibition Hall)

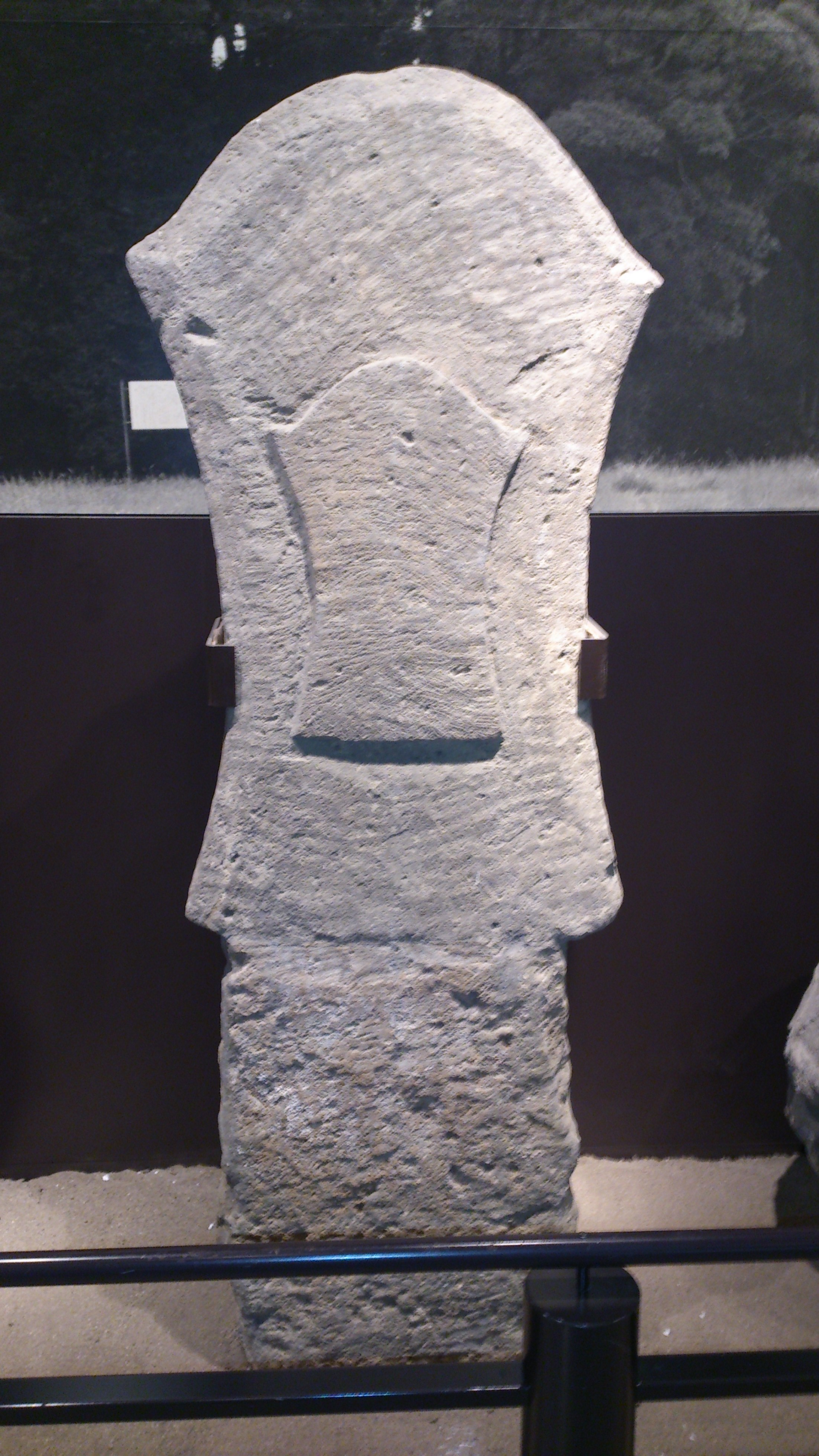
Shield from Iwatoyama Kofun, Fukuoka Prefecture

== See also ==
- Kumamoto Prefectural Ancient Burial Mound Museum
- Usuki Stone Buddhas
- Kumano Magaibutsu
- Gangū
