= Hitomi Kuroki =

Japanese actress and film director (born 1960)

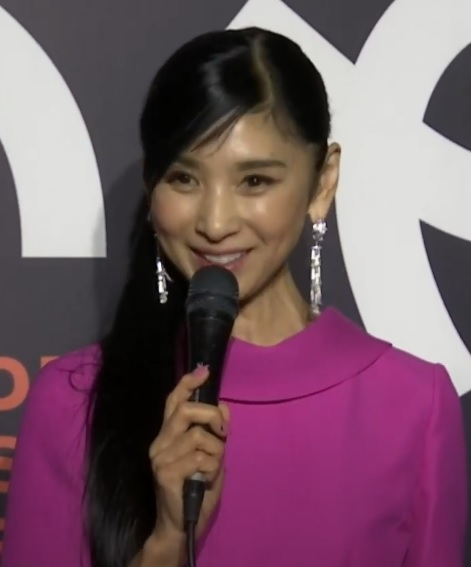
- Hitomi Kuroki at the 59th Golden Horse Awards in November 2022
- Born: Shōko Ichiji (伊知地昭子) (née Egami (江上)); October 5, 1960 (age 66); Former Kurogi, Yame District (now Yame, Fukuoka), Japan
- Occupations: Actress, film director
- Years active: 1981–present

Hitomi Kuroki (Japanese: 黒木 瞳; born October 5, 1960) is a Japanese actress and film director.

She was born in Fukuoka Prefecture in what was formerly called Kurogi in Yame District (now incorporated into Yame City). Her stage name derives from her hometown of Kuroki, and writer Hiroyuki Itsuki who was an alumnus of her Middle School came up with this full stage name.。

Kuroki was a member of the Takarazuka Revue, belonging to the Moon Troupe (Tsuki-gumi). Kuroki was the voice of Helen Parr/Elastigirl/Mrs. Incredible in the Japanese dub of The Incredibles. She won the award for best actress at the 22nd Hochi Film Award for Lost Paradise (1997).

== Curriculum vitae ==
=== Childhood ===
She was born 1960 (Showa 35) the youngest of 4 siblings (1 brother). Her father engaged in livestock husbandry, while her mother ran a diner. They were both strict disciplinarians, but Hitomi grew up carefreely without troubling her parent.

Her father was ranked 7-dan in kendō, and partly due to that influence, she took up practicing kendō at a dōjō from the 4th grade. She loved music from childhood and took piano lessons. And an avid reader as well.

As a 2nd year student in middle school, she was inspired to become an actress after watching a schoolmate in the daughter's role in Kan Kikuchi's play Chichi kaeru ("the father returns") put on by the students at the school culture festival. Having watched many films, she dreamed of being in the movies as well. (Note: She recalls asking her father if she can become an actress. But the embittered feeling at the time drove her all the more towards making her dream of becoming an actress come true.) She drew out a life-plan after middle school, that she would join the theater club in high school, study acting in university, join bungakuza, and become an actress.。

=== Takarazuka Music School ===
She enrolled at Fukuoka Prefectural Yame High School and joined the theater club; as club president she led her team in the all-Kyūshū competition. As a 1 year high schooler, she had seen the Takarazuka musical adaptation of The Rose of Versailles at the Fukuoka civic hall. and seeing Takarazuko on stage for the first time was tremendous impact. (Note: Quote Kuroki: "The Rose of Versailles was a mega-hit at the time, even a social phenom, and the first time I saw this stage production, it was stunning (impactful). The male role was performed by a woman, and I was wondering, what sort of world is this. But I was instantly captivated, and excited, and held it in adoration [as something to aspire to become].. Looking back now, I think that moment was the turning-point in my life.".) She went to see the show the year after and the next during the show's once a year tour to Fukuoka.

Although she was captivated by the theater, and dreamed of turning actress in Tokyo, she watched the Takarazuka performance strictly as a hobbyist's appreciation. Therefore she did not even try out to become a student at the Takarazuka Music School during the first two years of high school,、高校3年生の頃には音楽教師になろうと考えていた and was intending to enroll in a music university in Kumamoto Prefecture where she did get accepted. but because of her aforementioned fandom of Versailles (Beru Bara), she sent for application forms and pamphlets for Takarazuka. Noticing that the school only accepted applications before graduating high school, so she decided to fill out a form thinking of it as a commemorative thing to do.

She secretly took 1 week of ballet lessons without telling her parents, then went to the entrance examination. The exam date came a week after she got accepted by the music college. In the interview, she wound out speaking completely in her native Chikugo dialect, and in reply to her reasons for applying, she blurted the gaffe that "SKD (Shōchiku Kageki Dan) would have suited her just as well, naming the rival all-girls musical troupe. Nevertheless she got accepted, overcoming the odds of 22.4 to 1. Although she was initially intending to go through the try-out process purely as a commemorative experience, as she passed the primary and secondary examinations, the desire grew within her to actually become part of Takarazuka, and decided to change the course of her future plans. The parents were flat against it, but after her grandmother gave a nudge, (Note: The grandmother told the parents "she's the number 4 child, so why not let her lead her own path?".) they relented and gave their consent.

After enrolling in April 1979, the strictness of school codes and hierarchical relationship were "fine, as long as one got used to it", in her words, but she could not keep up with the lessons, which she worried over. To overcome this, she would leave the dormitory at 6:40 am to do training exercises on her own, and after school, she would go to private lessons, returning to the dorm just in time for the 22:30 curfew.

=== Takarazuka Revue ===
In 1981, Kuroki graduated 3rd place and joined the Takarazuka Revue as the 67th class. (Note: The Moon troupe's top star and sub-leader at the time was Yuri Haruna and she supposedly took notice of Kuroki during the 67th class performance, expressing her desire to have Kuroki assigned to the Moon team.)

Among notables in the same class are actresses Yōko Kitahara, Mayo Suzukaze, Miki Maya,CITEREFKobayashi2014 Irene Iida of mixed Mexican descent who became Japanese dance instructor, and Masumi Rika who has stayed on with the troupe as leader. Kuroki was assigned to the Moon troupe as a girl-part actrees on May 18.

The 67th class had their first show on stage in the Haru no odori that ran from March to May 1981. In May Kuroki was assigned to the Moon troupe as a girl-role actress.

She appeared starting January 1982 on the TV show Ohayō Asahi desu as a regular and its first assistant. While still in the troupe, she appeared in the affiliated Tōhō production film Minami Jūjisei ("Southern Cross"; English title: The Highest Honor) co-produced with the Australian film team. This was her first movie appearance.

She was cast in the heroine role in the July 1983 staging of the Ashibiki no yama no shizuku ni, then in August, was cast in the top female role opposite Mao Daichi still as a 2nd-year intern. This was the fastest promotion to the top spot for either male or females in the history of the Revue. Daichi was somewhat thin and small-faced for a male-role actress, and caught notice of Kuroki who was of similar build and was able to carry out her performance with gusto, and so made the offer, according to Kuroki.

She was cast in such Takarazuka titles as Ciboulette (シブーレット), Moonlight Romance, The Revue II, and Guys and Dolls (Takarazuka version).

When Daichi announced she was leaving the organization in August 1985, Kuroki decided it was time for her to leave as well. She had her final performance in the September 1, last show of A Tale of Two Cities/Heat Wave double show in Tokyo, and resigned from Takarazuka.。

=== Entertainment business ===
In her first leading role on film, she was cast in Keshin (released 1986) based on the original story by novelist Junichi Watanabe, directed by Yōichi Higashi. It grabbed public attention for her nude scenes, partly due to the fact she was a former Takarasienne. She won a best new actress prize for her role in the film at The 10th annual Japan Academy Film Prizes. Appearance in NHK Asadora series Miyako no kaze (1986) builds her popularity.

She continued to play suspense drama an other roles. In 1997, she starred in Shitsurakuen or Lost Paradise also an adaptation of the Watanabe Junichi novel A Lost Paradise, and directed by Yoshimitsu Morita. The title became a buzzword and a social phenomenon, with Kuroki winning the Japanese Academy's best actress prize.

She got married in 1990 and gave birth to a daughter in 1998.

She was the emcee for the Japan Record Awards ceremony in 1999 and 2000 which aired on TBS.

She played the lead distressed mother in the 2002 film adaptation of the horror story Dark Water directed by Hideo Nakata of Ring fame.

She made her directorial debut with the 2016 feature film adaptation of Nozomi Katsura's Iya na onna. Although Kuroki did not appear in this movie, she played the lead role in the TV drama version which aired the same year.

== Selected filmography ==
=== As director ===
- Iya na Onna (2016)
- The Devil Wears Jūnihitoe (2020)

=== As actress ===
==== Film ====
- Keshin (1986)
- Anego (1988)
- Dōten (1990 or January 26, 1991)
- Jūtai(1991)
- Ryaudatsu ai(1991)
- Kowagaru hitobito (怖がる人々; People who are frightened) segment of Kaen tsutsuji (火焔つつじ) (1994)
- Lost Paradise (1997), Rinko
- Sada (1998), Sada Abe
- Spellbound (1999), Hiroko Satō
- Dark Water (2002), Yoshimi Matsubara
- Tokyo Tower (2005), Shifumi
- Hideo Nakata's Kaidan (2007), Toyoshiga
- 20th Century Boys 1st–3rd (2008–2009), Kiriko Endo
- Utahime (2011), Mieko
- CM Time (2011)
- When Marnie Was There (2014), Hisako (voice)
- The Crossing (2014)
- Life in Overtime (2018)
- The Lies She Loved (2018)
- All About March (2020), Maria Yamada
- Majo no Kōsui (2023), Yayoi Shiraishi
- 18×2 Beyond Youthful Days (2024)
- Tomorrow in the Finder (2024)
- The Rose of Versailles (2025), narrator
- The Moon Is Watching (2026)

==== Television series ====
- The Gate of Youth (1991), Tae Ibuki
- Hachidai Shōgun Yoshimune (1995), Kume
- Ring: The Final Chapter (1999), Rieko Miyashita
- Majo no jouken (1999), Kyoko Kurosawa
- Golden Bowl (2002), Hitomi Sakura
- Good Luck!! (2003), Noriko Togashi
- The Great White Tower (2003), Keiko Hanamori
- Onihei Hankachō (2006) voice
- Real Clothes SP (2008), Jinbo Miki
- Real Clothes (2009), Jinbo Miki
- GTO (2012), Sakurai Ryoko
- Gunshi Kanbei (2014), One
- Rakuen (2017), Harumi Takahashi
- Shukatsu Kazoku (2017), Mizuki Tomikawa
- Overprotected Kahoko (2017), Izumi Nemoto
- Okehazama (2021), Dota Gozen
- Sunset (2023), Rinko Ōhata
- Passing the Reins (2025), Kyoko Sanno

==== Variety and cultural shows ====
- Waratte Iitomo
- Japan Record Award – preside
- Hey! Hey! Hey! Music Champ
- DON! (video)

=== Stage (Takarazuka Revue) ===
- Guys and Dolls – Sara
- A Tale of Two Cities

=== Stage ===
- Hamlet (1990)
- Christmas Box
- mama loves MAMBO (2000)
- mama lobes MAMBOII (2002)
- Hitomi Kuroki 25th anniversary Show "Musemore～talking&dancing" (2003)
- mama loves MAMBOIII (2004)
- MAMA LOVES mamboIV (2006)
- Hitomi Kuroki 30th Dreaming Dinner show (2010)
- Hitomi Kuroki is the reader the stage "Toritateya Oharu" (2010–2011)

=== Dubbing ===
- Ballerina – Odette
- The Incredibles – Elastigirl
- Incredibles 2 – Elastigirl
