= Iwatoyama History and Culture Exchange Center =

Museum in Yame, Fukuoka, Japan

- 八女市岩戸山歴史文化交流館
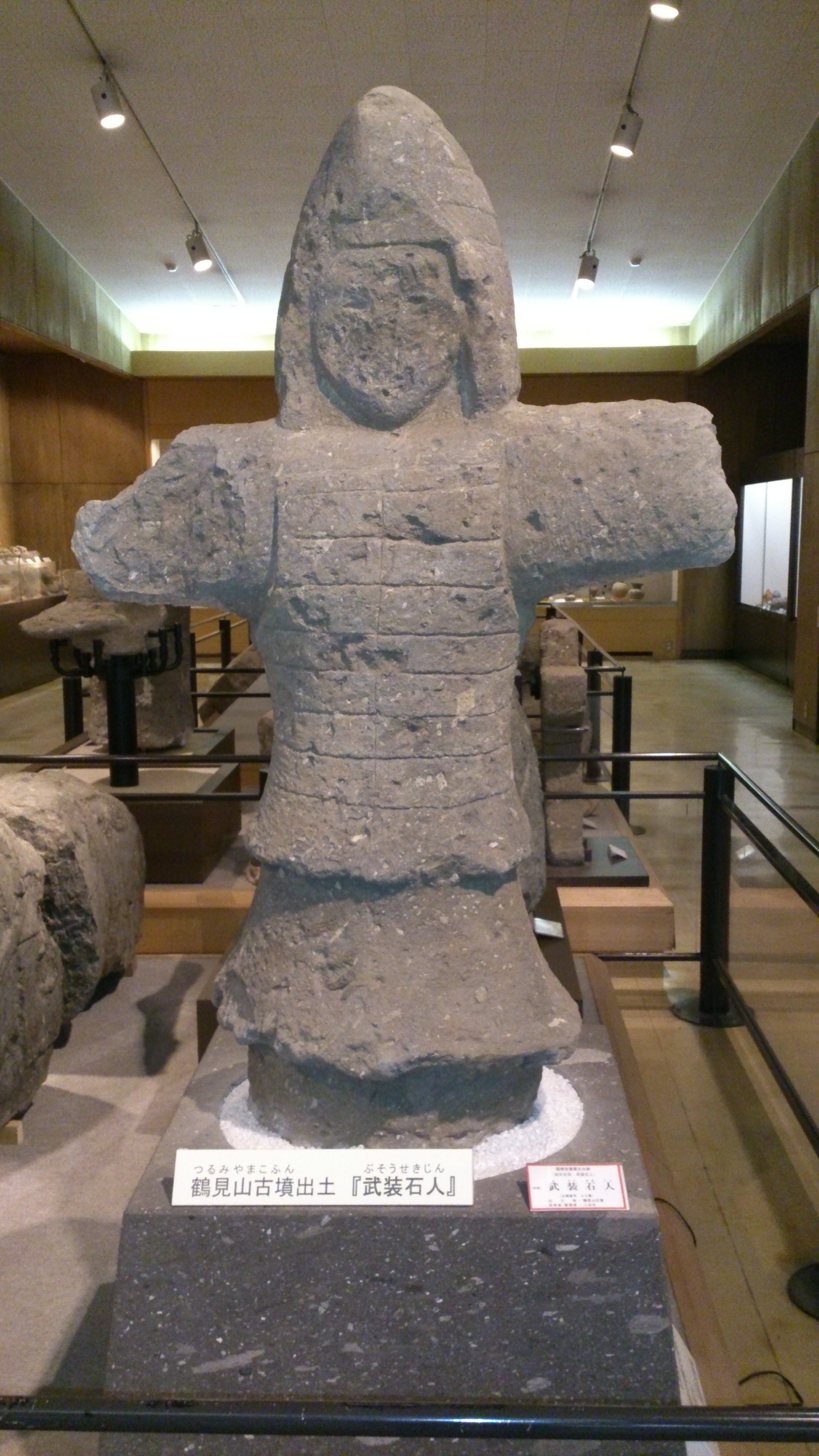
- Sekijin (ICP) from Tsurumiyama Kofun (former Iwatoyama History Museum)
- Interactive map of the Iwatoyama History and Culture Exchange Center area

General information
- Location: 1562-1 Yoshida, Yame, Fukuoka Prefecture, Japan
- Coordinates: 33°13′52″N 130°33′12″E
- Opened: 28 November 2015

Website
- Official website (in Japanese)

Iwatoyama History and Culture Exchange Center (八女市岩戸山歴史文化交流館, Yame-shi Iwatoyama Rekishi Bunka Kōryū-kan), also known in English as Iwatoyama Historical and Cultural Community Center, and nicknamed Iwai no Sato (いわいの郷), is a culture centre with a museum space that opened in Yame, Fukuoka, Japan in 2015. It supersedes and replaces the former Iwatoyama History Museum (岩戸山歴史資料館), which opened on another site in the vicinity in 1984 and closed in 2015, after attracting some 300,000 visitors. Located next to Iwatoyama Kofun, the new facility has spaces for a variety activities and events and a permanent exhibition that focuses on Tsukushi no Iwai, the Iwai Rebellion, and ancient Yame, with exhibits including sekijin sekiba from Yame Kofun Cluster.

== See also ==
- Kyushu Historical Museum
- Kyushu National Museum
- Itokoku History Museum
