= Joyo =

Joyo may refer to:

- Joyo (tribe) in Pakistan
- Jōyō, Kyoto, a city in Japan
- Jōyō, Fukuoka, a former town in Japan
- Jōyō kanji, a set of characters used in Japanese writing
- Joyo Bank, a banking company in Japan
- Joyo.com, a Chinese website acquired by Amazon.com
- Jōyō (nuclear reactor), a liquid metal research reactor
