= Lost Paradise =

Lost Paradise may refer to:

== Film and television ==
- The Lost Paradise (1914 film), an American silent film
- The Lost Paradise (1917 film), a German silent film based on the Ludwig Fulda play (see below)
- The Lost Paradise (1985 film), a Spanish film
- Lost Paradise (film), a 1997 Japanese film based on the Junichi Watanabe novel (see below)
- "Lost Paradise" (Raised by Wolves), a television episode

== Literature ==
- A Lost Paradise, a 1997 novel by Junichi Watanabe, adapted for a film and television series
- Lost Paradise (novel), a 2004 novel by Cees Nooteboom
- Lost Paradise (Marks book), a 2009 book about the 2004 Pitcairn Islands sexual assault trial, by Kathy Marks
- The Lost Paradise, an 1892 play by Ludwig Fulda

== Other media ==
- Lost Paradise (album) or the title song, by Paradise Lost, 1990
- Fist of the North Star: Lost Paradise, a 2018 video game based on the manga series Fist of the North Star

== See also ==
- Paradise Lost (disambiguation)
- 失楽園 (disambiguation)
