= Keshin (film) =

1986 Japanese film

- Film poster
- Directed by: Yōichi Higashi
- Screenplay by: Machiko Nasu
- Based on: Keshin by Junichi Watanabe
- Produced by: Katsuhiro Maeda
- Starring: Hitomi Kuroki; Tatsuya Fuji; Yoko Aki
- Cinematography: Koichi Kawakami
- Edited by: Keiko Ichihara
- Music by: Takashi Kako
- Production company: Toei
- Distributed by: Toei
- Release date: October 10, 1988 (Japan)
- Running time: 105 minutes
- Country: Japan
- Language: Japanese
- Budget: ¥450 million
- Box office: ¥550 million

Keshin (Japanese: 化身), also known as Metamorphosis, is a 1986 Japanese erotic drama film directed by Yōichi Higashi, with a script by Machiko Nasu, based on the 1985 novel of the same title by Junichi Watanabe. The film stars Hitomi Kuroki in her debut role, as well as Tatsuya Fuji and Yoko Aki. Toei released Keshin on October 10, 1988, in Japan, where it was a box office success. The film's theme song, "Tasogarebito" (黄昏人), was performed by Mariko Takahashi.

== Premise ==
Daisaburo Akiba (Tatsuya Fuji) is a 46-year-old, well-to-do literary critic who is dating freelance reporter Fumiko (Yoko Aki). One day, Daisaburo spots a 24-year-old hostess named Kiriko (Hitomi Kuroki) in Ginza. He is immediately smitten with the young woman despite her shyness and plain style. Daisaburo, seeing potential in Kiriko, offers to support her financially in exchange for helping her "better herself". Kiriko accepts his proposal. Under Daisaburo's tutelage, Kiriko grows confident in demeanor and sophisticated in appearance. The two soon fall in love, but Daisaburo's behavior becomes ever more controlling. Kiriko struggles with her love for Daisaburo, the financial support he offers and her desire for independence.

== Cast ==
- Hitomi Kuroki as Kiriko Yajima
- Tatsuya Fuji as Daisaburo Akiba
- Yoko Aki as Fumiko Tabe
- Keiko Awaji as Hisako Akiba
- Yoshiko Mita as Tae
- Tatsuo Umemiya as Nomura
- Hiroko Aota as Kyoko
- Masato Hoshi as Katsura
- Sakura Kamo as Mama
- Hidekazu Nagai as Tatsuhiko Murai
- Ichiro Ogura as Yamaguchi
- Kinya Sugi as Hagiwara
- Midori Yamamoto as Aunt

== Home media ==
Keshin was released on DVD on July 21, 2002. The film was later released on Blu-ray on October 7, 2015.

== See also ==
- Pygmalion (mythology)
