= Koppage-men =

Koppage-men (こっぱげ面) is a traditional ritual held in Hoshino Village, Yame City, Fukuoka Prefecture, located on the island of Kyushu, Japan.

== Overview ==
Koppage-men is a traditional Shinto ritual performed annually in July during the Gion Festival in Hoshino Village, Yame City, Fukuoka Prefecture. Young men wearing demon masks (鬼面) carry green bamboo staffs and parade through the village, striking residents on the buttocks to drive away evil spirits and pray for good health throughout the year.

The festival takes place in mid-July at three local shrines: Nagao, Misaka, and Matobetto. The demons are accompanied by a lion (shishi), and they visit homes where villagers offer them food and sake.

== Ritual Purification ==
As mentioned above, Koppage-men originated as a ritual to ward off crop pests and water-related disasters during the rainy season. Several elements of the festival serve as acts of purification:

- Green Bamboo Being struck on the buttocks by the green bamboo wielded by the demon is believed to dispel evil spirits and misfortune, ensuring good health for one year.
- Shishi (Lion) It is said that being bitten by the lion helps heal physical pain or ailments in the affected area.
- Gohei Paper These are strips of sacred paper attached to the back of the demon’s head. It is believed that if one manages to stealthily take a piece and display it in their home, it brings good fortune.

== History ==
The exact origin of Koppage-men is unclear, but it is believed to date back to the mid-Edo period, giving it a history of over 250 years. The ritual likely has roots in folk beliefs related to protecting crops from disease, pests, and natural disasters.

In recent years, the festival has come to represent broader prayers for regional safety and disaster prevention, making it one of the most symbolic and cherished traditions in Hoshino Village.
