= Fukuoka 7th district =

- Parliamentary constituency for the Japanese House of Representatives
- Numbered map of the Fukuoka Prefecture single seats
- Prefecture: Fukuoka
- Proportional District: Kyushu
- Electorate: 279,193

Current constituency
- Created: 1994
- Seats: One
- Party: LDP
- Representatives: Satoshi Fujimaru
- Municipalities: Cities of Chikugo, Miyama, Omuta, Yame, and Yanagawa. District of Yame.

Fukuoka 7th district (福岡県第7区, Fukuoka-ken dai-nanaku or simply 福岡7区, Fukuoka-nanaku) is a single-member constituency of the House of Representatives in the national Diet of Japan located in Fukuoka Prefecture.

== Areas covered ==
=== Since 2013 ===
- Chikugo
- Miyama
- Ōmuta
- Yame
- Yanagawa
- Yame District

=== 1994 - 2013 ===
- Chikugo
- Ōmuta
- Yame
- Yanagawa
- Yame District
- Yamato District
- Miike District

== List of representatives ==
Election	Representative	Party	Notes
1996	Makoto Koga	LDP	
2000	Makoto Koga	LDP	
2003	Makoto Koga	LDP	
2005	Makoto Koga	LDP	
2009	Makoto Koga	LDP	
2012	Satoshi Fujimaru	LDP	
2014	Satoshi Fujimaru	LDP	
2017	Satoshi Fujimaru	LDP	
2021	Satoshi Fujimaru	LDP	
2024	Satoshi Fujimaru	LDP	
2026	Satoshi Fujimaru	LDP	

== Election results ==
=== 2026 ===
2026
Party	Candidate	Votes	%	±%
LDP	Satoshi Fujimaru (Incumbent)	95,132	67.1	▲10.15
Centrist Reform	Akihisa Kameda	46,592	32.9	▼1.29
Majority		48,540	34.2	▲11.44
Registered electors		273,621		
Turnout		141,724	54.07	▲2.07
LDP hold				

=== 2024 ===
2024
Party	Candidate	Votes	%	±%
LDP	Satoshi Fujimaru (Incumbent)	79,029	56.95	▼5.35
CDP	Akihisa Kameda	47,444	34.19	▼3.51
JCP	Shiro Hirashima	12,307	8.86	N/A
Majority		31,585	22.76	
Registered electors		278,164		
Turnout			52.00	▼0.53
LDP hold				

=== 2021 ===
2021
Party	Candidate	Votes	%	±%
LDP	Satoshi Fujimaru (Incumbent)	92,233	62.30	▲4.99
CDP	Tsuyoshi Aoki	55,820	37.70	New
Majority		36,413	24.60	
Registered electors		288,733		
Turnout			52.53	▼2.30
LDP hold				

=== 2017 ===
2017
Party	Candidate	Votes	%	±%
LDP	Satoshi Fujimaru (Incumbent)	91,477	57.31	▼13.23
Kibō no Tō	Keisuke Hara	48,190	30.19	New
JCP	Manabu Eguchi	19,953	12.50	▼16.96
Majority		43,287	27.12	
Registered electors		301,415		
Turnout			54.83	▲6.36
LDP hold				

=== 2014 ===
2014
Party	Candidate	Votes	%	±%
LDP	Satoshi Fujimaru (Incumbent)	95,796	70.54	▲16.94
JCP	Manabu Eguchi	40,003	29.46	▲23.98
Majority		55,793	41.08	
Registered electors		302,683		
Turnout			48.47	▼11.64
LDP hold				

=== 2012 ===
2012
Party	Candidate	Votes	%	±%
LDP	Satoshi Fujimaru	96,172	53.60	▼1.43
Democratic	Kuniyoshi Noda	53,647	29.90	▼15.07
Your	Teruo Koga	19,775	11.02	New
JCP	Manabu Eguchi	9,845	5.48	N/A
Majority		42,525	23.70	
Registered electors				
Turnout			60.11	
LDP hold				

=== 2009 ===
2009
Party	Candidate	Votes	%	±%
LDP	Makoto Koga (Incumbent)	128,137	55.03	▲0.93
Democratic	Kuniyoshi Noda (Won PR seat)	104,728	44.97	▲8.62
Majority		23,409	10.06	
Registered electors				
Turnout				
LDP hold				

=== 2005 ===
2005
Party	Candidate	Votes	%	±%
LDP	Makoto Koga (Incumbent)	112,420	54.10	
Democratic	Daisuke Nakaya	75,524	36.35	N/A
JCP	Hidehisa Ōmori	19,847	9.55	
Majority		36,896	17.75	
Registered electors				
Turnout				
LDP hold				
