= Tachibana, Fukuoka =

Dissolved municipality in Fukuoka prefecture, Japan

Coordinates: 33°12′N 130°35′E

Tachibana (立花町, Tachibana-machi) was a town located in Yame District, Fukuoka Prefecture, Japan.

As of 2003, the town had an estimated population of 12,020 and a density of 138.73 persons per km^{2}. The total area was 86.64 km^{2}.

On February 1, 2010, Tachibana, along with the town of Kurogi, and the villages of Hoshino and Yabe (all from Yame District), was merged into the expanded city of Yame.
