= Sekijinsan Kofun =

- 石神山古墳 (Japanese)
- Sekijinsan Kofun Sekijinsan Kofun (Japan)
- Interactive map of Sekijinsan Kofun
- 33°05′39″N 130°28′46″E
- Type: Kofun
- Periods: Kofun period
- Location: Miyama, Fukuoka, Japan
- Region: Kyushu

History
- Built: c.6th century

Site notes
- Public access: Yes (no facilities)

The Sekijinsan Kofun (石神山古墳) is a Kofun period burial mound, located in the Takatamachi Kamikusuda neighborhood of the city of Miyama, Fukuoka Prefecture Japan. The tumulus was designated a National Historic Site of Japan in 1976. It should not be confused with the Sekijinsan Kofun (石人山古墳) located in Hirokawa, Fukuoka, whose name is written in slightly different kanji.

== Overview ==
The Sekijinsan Kofun is located at the tip of a hill that extends from east-to-west to the north of Kamikusuda hamlet. It is a zenpō-kōen-fun (前方後円墳), which is shaped like a keyhole, having one square end and one circular end, when viewed from above, with a total length of 58.5 meters, and constructed in three tiers. It is orientated to the east, and has a posterior circular portion diameter of 18 meters and a usually low and narrow anterior rectangular portion of six meters in with and eight meters in length. There is a row of cylindrical haniwa on the top of the hill. In 1911, while local people were clearing land in the area, three boat-shaped sarcophagi were discovered in the center of the posterior circle. All of the sarcophagi are made of tuff from Mount Aso, with the insides painted in vermilion, and each one is of a different size. The large and medium-sized sarcophagi align with the main axis, while the small coffin is located to the west and perpendicular to the main axis. The largest sarcophagus has protrusions for ropes (two on each side), where as the smaller ones had one on the shorter side and two on the longer side. Grave goods excavated include iron sword pieces, iron dagger pieces, a bronze chime, and silver-plated copperware. No trace of a stone burial chamber has been found.

The tumulus also has a 107-cm tall stone figure at the top of the posteior circle, also made of tuff from Mount Aso. It depicting an armed stone figure with a helmet and short armor, originally painted with red pigment. The image is weathered, and is missing its legs, although triangular decorations on the cuirass are well-preserved. Such stone figures are a characteristic of kofun primarily in northern Kyushu, and date from the 5th to 6th centuries. In addition to armored warriors, animals such as horses, boars and chickens are commonly found. Such depictions are also found in figurative haniwa and it is thought that these stone images were used in lieu of haniwa in this region of Kyushu. The statue was designed a National Important Cultural Property in 1976.

The tumulus is located behind the Kamikusuda Tenman-gū shrine. A shed has been installed to protect the statue and the three sarcophagi; although not normally open to visitors, it is possible to view these artifacts through a window. The site is approximately a 30-minute walk from Wataze Station on the JR Kyushu Kagoshima Main Line.

== See also ==
- List of Historic Sites of Japan (Fukuoka)
