= Satoshi Fujimaru =

Japanese politician

- 藤丸 敏
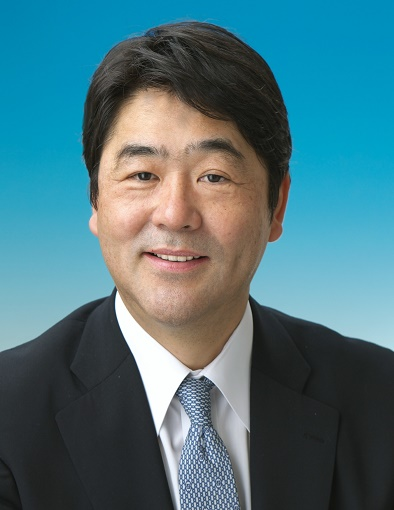
- Fujimaru in 2012

Member of the House of Representatives
- Incumbent
- Assumed office 17 December 2012
- Preceded by: Makoto Koga
- Constituency: Fukuoka 7th

Personal details
- Born: 19 January 1960 (age 66) Setaka, Fukuoka, Japan
- Party: Liberal Democratic
- Education: Tokyo Gakugei University
- Website: Satoshi Fujimaru website

Satoshi Fujimaru (藤丸 敏, Fujimaru Satoshi; born 19 January 1960) is a Japanese politician of the Liberal Democratic Party who serves as a member of the House of Representatives.

== Early years ==
In 1960, Fujimaru was born in 1960 in Setaka, Yamato District, Fukuoka Prefecture.

He entered the Faculty of Education of Tokyo Gakugei University in 1980 and served as an attendant secretary under Makoto Koga. In 1985, he graduated from the Faculty of Education of Tokyo Gakugei University, and since 1985, he had been a part-time lecturer in social studies at Rissho Junior and Senior High Schools affiliated with Rissho University and 1987 at Hongo Junior and Senior High Schools.

He dropped out of graduate school in 1988 and served as secretary to Koga since 1996.

== Political career ==
In the 2012 general election, Fujimaru ran for Fukuoka 7th district as Koga's successor and defeated DPJ's Kuniyoshi Noda, former secretary to Koga like Fujimaru.

In the 2014 general election, Fujimaru hold the seat.

In 2015, Fujimaru was appointed to Parliamentary Secretary for Defense in the Third Abe First reshuffled cabinet.

In the 2017 general election, Fujimaru defeated Kibō's candidate and other candidates.

In the 2021 general election, Fujimaru defeated CDP candidate and hold the seat.

In 2022, Fujimaru was appointed to State Minister of Cabinet Office in the Second Kishida First reshuffled cabinet.

In the 2024 general election, Fujimaru defeated CDP candidate and hold the seat.

In the 2026 general election, Fujimaru defeated CRA candidate and hold the seat.

== Scandal ==
=== Slip of a tongue during his tenure as Parliamentary Secretary of Defense ===
In a speech in Saga City on 28 March 2016, during his tenure as Parliamentary Secretary of Defense, Fujimaru said, "It is difficult to imagine that war will break out. Even if the worst happens, the capital is basically attacked at first," and "the risk may increase somewhat." Fujimaru also said that it would ask the Saga prefectural Assembly to set a deadline to decide whether to accept or not to deploy Ospreys at Saga Airport in June. However, Japanese government thought it would be difficult to deploy Osprey at Saga Airport.

At the House of Representatives Internal Affairs and Communications Committee on April 7, Fujimaru was questioned by Takaaki Tamura, a JCP lawmaker, why Fujimaru had explained these remarks and the breakdown of the budget related to facilities (about 10.6 billion yen) that the Ministry of Defense did not disclose details in the speech in Saga City. He answered, "I have the same idea as PM Shinzo Abe (PM Abe said at House of Councillors Budget Committee in January 2016, "We haven't gotten agreement of local Saga people yet")." Regarding the deadline for consent or disapproval, he explained, "As a member of the National Assembly, I expressed my hope," and apologized, saying, "I was careless as a parliamentary secretary."

In the speech in Saga City, Fujimaru also explained the time (non-disclosure data) when the SDF radar detected the ballistic missile launched by North Korea on 7 February 2016 and the SDF's specific interceptor system. He apologized for these remarks.

=== Adultery ===
In July 2017, News Post Seven, published by Shogakukan, reported Fujimaru walking into a skyscraper apartment together after taking a dog walk with his mistress. Asked by a reporter about his adultery, Fujimaru said, "My wife and I have been separated from each other since 2000 on the premise of divorce. I'm going to marry her when the divorce is finalised," he said.
