= Yabe, Fukuoka =

Yabe 矢部村
- Former municipality
- Location in Japan
- Coordinates: 33°9′N 130°49′E
- Country: Japan
- Region: Kyushu
- Prefecture: Fukuoka Prefecture
- District: Yame
- Merged: 1 February 2010 (now part of Yame)

Area
  - Total: 80.46 km^{2} (31.07 sq mi)

Population (28 June 2006)
  - Total: 1,730
- Time zone: UTC+09:00 (JST)
- Website: Yabe Village
- Symbols
- Bird: Copper pheasant
- Flower: Rhododendron
- Tree: Cryptomeria japonica, sakura

Yabe (矢部村, Yabe-mura) was a village located in Yame District, Fukuoka Prefecture, Japan.

Yabe is located at 330m above sea level. The average temperature is 14 °C and the average annual precipitation is 2,706mm.

As of 2006, the village had an estimated population of 1,730 and a density of 21.50 persons per km^{2}. The total area was 80.46 km^{2}.

On 1 February 2010, Yabe, along with the towns of Kurogi and Tachibana, and the village of Hoshino (all from Yame District), was merged into the expanded city of Yame.
