= Makoto Koga =

Japanese politician

- 古賀 誠
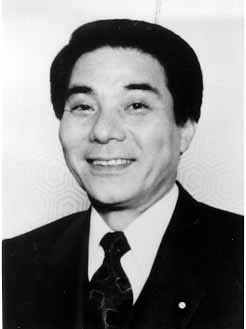
- Official portrait, 1996

Secretary-General of the Liberal Democratic Party
- In office December 2000 – 24 April 2001
- President: Yoshirō Mori
- Preceded by: Hiromu Nonaka
- Succeeded by: Taku Yamasaki

Minister of Transport
- In office 7 November 1996 – 11 September 1997
- Preceded by: Yoshiyuki Kamei
- Succeeded by: Takao Fujii
- Constituency: Ryutaro Hashimoto

Member of the House of Representatives
- In office 23 June 1980 – 16 November 2012
- Preceded by: Tsuneo Gondō
- Succeeded by: Satoshi Fujimaru
- Constituency: Fukuoka 3rd (1980–1996); Fukuoka 7th (1996–2012)

Personal details
- Born: 5 August 1940 (age 86) Setaka, Fukuoka, Japan
- Party: Liberal Democratic
- Education: Nihon University

Makoto Koga (古賀 誠, Koga Makoto; born 5 August 1940) is a former Japanese politician of the Liberal Democratic Party, who served as a member of the House of Representatives in the Diet (national legislature) and formerly Minister of Transport. A native of Setaka, Fukuoka and graduate of Nihon University, he was elected for the first time in 1980 after an unsuccessful run in 1979.

The character Tetsuya Gamon in the manga Akumetsu is based on him.

Party political offices
Preceded by Mitsuo Horiuchi	Head of Kōchikai faction 2006–2012	Succeeded by Fumio Kishida
