= Hoshino, Fukuoka =

Dissolved municipality in Fukuoka Prefecture, Japan

Coordinates: 33°15′N 130°46′E

Hoshino (星野村, Hoshino-mura) was a village located in Yame District, Fukuoka Prefecture, Japan.

As of 2003, the village had an estimated population of 3,707 and a density of 45.61 persons per km^{2}. The total area was 81.28 km^{2}.

On February 1, 2010, Hoshino, along with the towns of Kurogi and Tachibana, and the village of Yabe (all from Yame District), was merged into the expanded city of Yame.

== See also ==
- The Most Beautiful Villages in Japan
