= Shitsurakuen (manga) =

Japanese manga series

- Japanese cover of Shitsurakuen volume 1.

失楽園
- Manga
- Written by: Tōru Naomura
- Published by: Square Enix
- Magazine: Monthly Gangan Joker
- Original run: May 22, 2009 – March 2011
- Volumes: 6

Shitsurakuen (失楽園; literally Paradise Lost) is a shōnen manga series written and illustrated by Tōru Naomura. It follows the story of Himoto Sora, a transfer student with a sense of justice and dreams of becoming a knight. Upon arriving at Utopia Academy, she learns of a virtual reality-like game played by the male students in which they use girls as weapons in battles for status and treat them as commodities. Seeing one of these girls being abused, she steps in and unwittingly becomes the first female participant of the game.

== Characters ==
=== Sora and her Weapons ===
Sora Himoto (緋本 ソラ, Sora Himoto)
The lone female participant in the Exaclan game, she is tasked with overthrowing male dominance. She is honorable, but not very bright. Wishing to be a knight and to protect the princesses, she even tells X, when asked to "possess and protect", that there is no way she would own a princess.
Koharu Izaki (伊咲 コハル, Izaki Koharu)
Sora's first princess. She is wholly devoted to Sora and plans to help her. She has a docile and sweet personality, and is easily embarrassed. She is very fond of Sora, often becoming absorbed in vivid fantasies about her. Her habit of letting her imagination run away with her makes her the object of Yuki's teasing. She does not often accompany Sora out like Reiko or Tomoko, and spends much of her time in Yuki's room which becomes a hangout spot for the group. She is one of the six "stars" and her weapon is a long, dual-barreled rifle.
Yuki Yagizawa (八木澤 ユキ, Yagizawa Yuki)
Sora's second princess. She was the first girl Sora observed in a battle, when Sora first arrived at Utopia Academy. She was afraid to stand up, but was given hope when she saw Sora and Koharu. She spends much of the series bed-ridden due to injuries inflicted by her former owner. She takes it upon herself to keep records and research the school system. She is quite mild-mannered and kind, but has a mischievous streak. Her warm exterior hides that she often lacks confidence and sees herself as weak. She is physically characterized by her long, twin braids. Her weapon is a dagger and is considered rather weak, but it later transforms into a katana (thanks to Tsuki's hacking skills) and gains a symbol.
Tomoko Oashi (小芦 トモコ, Oashi Tomoko)
The first girl who Sora gave to Karin. She did not want to be in the minority and could not handle being bullied so she asked Sora to release her. But El tells Mitarai to torture Tomoko until the very last moment before the final stage of the warning penalty. Later she is released by Karin and once again possessed by Sora after being rescued by her in the woods. She becomes very attached to Sora and occasionally possessive. She is often at ends with Reiko, mainly due to her closeness with Sora. She is one of the six "stars" and her weapon is a spear.
Reiko Date (伊達 レイコ, Date Reiko)
A girl previously owned by Sumita of the student council. Sumita loses a match against Sora on purpose in order to pass Reiko on to her. To the other girls' surprise, Reiko states that being owned by a student council member is what she wants. It is later revealed that for the last four years, Reiko has allowed herself to be passed from abusive owner to owner in order to become the companion of someone with influence in the school. She believed that by serving a powerful man, she would be able to manipulate things so that all the girls at Utopia Academy could be freed. However, when she returned to find Sumita she became Tougyu's possession and was severely tortured. Sora eventually found out, and decided to free her by using the warning penalty (though being hesitant to physically assault Reiko, she resigned herself to feigning a sexual assault). Despite the fact that no other girls wanted to help her when she decided to fight the system and the years of abuse she endured, she feels a strong desire to protect the weak and believes it is something she must achieve on her own. She finally breaks down when Sora tells her she no longer needs to be alone, and joins Sora's group. She feels a strong sense of responsibility as a senpai and embodies the tsundere character. She comes to trust Sora a great deal and often accompanies her. She is one of the six "stars" and her weapon is a flail.
Hiyo Shishido (志々堂 ヒヨ, Shishidō Hiyo)
A girl who was initially depicted as being madly in love with Sora after being rescued by her though this turned out to be an act. Hiyo has an older sister who always fought against men, resulting in injuries that forced her to drop out of school. Reiko mentions Sora was a lot like Hiyo's sister, because she was reckless and had similar ideals though this earns Sora Hiyo's contempt at her success. Eventually the gang finds out Hiyo stole the record of all the saved girls, ordering Tougyu to attack them. It later turns out she was manipulated by him to avoid the same fate as her sister. After Tougyu incapacitates himself, she becomes Sora's weapon. She is one of the six "stars", and her weapon is a large axe.

=== Student Council ===
El
The president of the student council. He is said to be cruel and cold-hearted, but this is only a persona to achieve harmony among the students; his real name is Karin, the heir to the company Iwahijiri. He is physically characterized by his mask, or when he is Karin, his eye-patch. He possesses one of the "stars". he has placed all his hopes in Sora and after revealing this to her, she is knocked out by the revelation as Karin is a kind and caring person who even taught her how to save the girls and taught her and Akane how to fight. He is also older than he appears, and merely posing as a student.
Sumita (墨田)
The vice-president of the student council. He wears a pair of black glasses. He does appear to have a kind side, as is demonstrated when he gets Tougyu to release Reiko, and in an omake chapter depicting him anonymously leaving a gift for Reiko while she is hospitalized.
Mitarai (御手洗)
A gay man who is madly in love with El.
Shojo (丞上, Shōjō)
As a child, he too idolized the Knight who Sora aspires to be, and when he first started attending Utopia Academy he wanted to rescue the girls who were being oppressed. However, he was caught by the school's staff and brainwashed to view everyone as trash. The one person he cares for is El, who he calls his "god."
Haruka Kuchinawa (朽奈和 ハルカ, Kuchinawa Haruka)
Always with El, but has some sort of connection to Kawazu. As shown in the 'Continued' chapter, Haruka is a woman and Kawazu's mother, and thus only posing as a student like Karin.
Tamao Kawazu (川津 タマオ, Kawazu Tamao)
All talk and no power, although he secretly hates the systematic misogyny in the school. It is later revealed that he is Kuchinawa's son. He is distantly related to Tsuki through his father.
Shinji Kajiwara (梶原 シンジ, Kajiwara Shinji)
The first enemy who Sora defeated, he has lost several times to Sora. He seems to be in love with Koharu, yet sees her as a mere object to obtain.
Shiro Togyu (東岌 シロウ, Tōgyū Shirō)
He is insane and has destroyed many girls. He briefly had ownership over Reiko and had tortured her badly before Sora rescued her. Sora believes that he "saved" Hiyo by directing her anger away from Iwahijiri, so that she would not be destroyed as her sister had been.

=== Others ===
Tsuki Aoi (蒼井 ツキ, Aoi Tsuki)
Sora's closest and best friend. She is a mysterious figure, the brain behind Sora's brawn. She is owned by El and claims that this allows her to collect information about Exaclan, but in truth she is secretly the sub-chief of Exaclan and may be responsible for Sora being able to participate in Exaclan. On two occasions she disguised herself as "Ix", the princess of the legend; in this guise she wears a mask with a flower ornament and a long golden wig. Her weapon seems to be a blade that appears to be made of an extreme energy and is the most powerful weapon seen thus far, though this (as well as the fact that "Ix" was able to be used as Sora's weapon despite Tsuki's being owned by El) may be due to Tsuki's position in the Exaclan system and ability to rewrite the code of the game. Tsuki is determined to monopolize Sora as her knight, because she is the only one who understands her, and so convinces Sora from their childhood that she should only save the girls, because they are princesses. It was revealed that she is the one who originally wounded Karin's right eye.
Akane (アカネ)
One of Sora's allies. He seems to have some feelings for her. Wore a pair of glasses to 'hide', as Karin put it, but has now gotten rid of them, declaring that he's done hiding. Rather kind, if physically weak.
