= Kurogi, Fukuoka =

Town in Japan

Coordinates: 33°13′N 130°40′E

Town flag

Kurogi (黒木町, Kurogi-machi) was a town located in Yame District, Fukuoka Prefecture, Japan.

As of 2003, the town had an estimated population of 14,023 and a density of 103.50 persons per km^{2}. The total area was 135.49 km^{2}.

On February 1, 2010, Kurogi, along with the town of Tachibana, and the villages of Hoshino and Yabe (all from Yame District), was merged into the expanded city of Yame.

== See also ==
- Groups of Traditional Buildings
