= Jōyō, Fukuoka =

Dissolved municipality in Fukuoka prefecture, Japan

Jōyō (上陽町, Jōyō-machi) was a town located in Yame District, Fukuoka Prefecture, Japan.

As of 2003, the town had an estimated population of 4,063 and a density of 68.49 persons per km^{2}. The total area was 59.32 km^{2}.

On October 1, 2006, Jōyō was merged into the expanded city of Yame.
