= Paradise Lost (disambiguation) =

Paradise Lost is an epic Christian poem by John Milton.

Paradise Lost may also refer to:

== Music ==
=== Bands ===
- Paradise Lost (band), a British gothic metal band

=== Albums ===
- Paradise Lost (Cirith Ungol album)
- Paradise Lost (Delta Heavy album)
- Paradise Lost, a 2005 album by Hasan Salaam
- Paradise Lost (Symphony X album)
- Paradise Lost (Paradise Lost album)

=== Songs ===
- "Paradise Lost (You're the Reason Why)", a song by Half Man Half Biscuit from the 2002 album Cammell Laird Social Club
- "Paradise Lost", a song by Kaya from the 2006 album Glitter
- Paradise Lost (Herd song), 1967
- "Paradise Lost" (Minori Chihara song), 2008
- "Paradise Lost", a song by Hollywood Undead from the 2008 album Swan Songs
- "Paradise Lost", a song by Gain from the 2015 EP Hawwah
- "Paradise Lost", a song by the band Paradise Lost from the 1990 album Lost Paradise
- "Paradise Lost, a poem by John Milton", a song by The Used from the 2020 album Heartwork

== Film ==
- Paradise Lost (1940 film), a French drama film directed by Abel Gance
- Paradise Lost (1971 film), a 1971 television movie of the play by Clifford Odets (1935)
- Paradise Lost: The Child Murders at Robin Hood Hills, a 1996 documentary
  - Paradise Lost 2: Revelations, a 2000 sequel to Paradise Lost: The Child Murders at Robin Hood Hills
  - Paradise Lost 3: Purgatory, the third installment in the documentary series, released in 2011
- Kamen Rider 555: Paradise Lost, a 2003 movie retelling of the tokusatsu TV series Masked Rider 555
- Paradise Lost, also known as Turistas, a 2006 vacation horror film
- Jonestown: Paradise Lost, 2007 docudrama about the Jonestown tragedy
- Eden of the East the Movie II: Paradise Lost, the second theatrical release for the animated series Eden of the East (2010)
- Paradise Lost (2011 film), a Chinese teen sex comedy film
- Paradise Lost (2026 film), a South Korean psychological thriller film
- Escobar: Paradise Lost, a 2014 romantic thriller film

== Theater ==
- Paradise Lost (Penderecki), a 1978 opera by Krzysztof Penderecki
- Paradise Lost (play), a 1935 American drama by Clifford Odets
- Paradise Lost: Shadows and Wings, a 2007 opera by Eric Whitacre

== Television ==
- Paradise Lost (2020 TV series), an American television series debuted in 2020
- Paradise Lost (upcoming TV series), an American television series

=== Episodes ===
- "Paradise Lost" (Agents of S.H.I.E.L.D.) (2016)
- "Paradise Lost" (Bionic Woman) (2007)
- "Paradise Lost" (Eureka Seven episode) (2005)
- "Paradise Lost" (Justice League episode) (2002)
- Paradise Lost (Shameless), an episode of the American TV series Shameless
- "Paradise Lost" (Sliders) (1997)
- "Paradise Lost" (Star Trek: Deep Space Nine) (1996)
- "Paradise Lost" (Stargate SG-1) (2003)
- "Paradise Lost" (TaleSpin) (1991)
- "Paradise Lost" (The Unit) (2007)

== Books ==
- Paradise Lost (novel), the third novel in the Japanese mystery series Joker Game
- Paradise Lost: Smyrna 1922, a 2008 historical book by Giles Milton

== Other uses ==
- Paradise Lost (video game), a 2007 arcade version of Far Cry Instincts
- Paradise Lost, a 2015 expansion for the game Postal 2.
- Paradise Lost, the subtitle of Mega Man X8
- GTO: Paradise Lost, a 2014 manga by Tooru Fujisawa
- Paradises Lost

== See also ==
- Lost Paradise (disambiguation)
- 失楽園 (disambiguation)
