= Yame Kofun Cluster =

Kofun period burial mound cluster in Fukuoka, Japan

Yame Kofun cluster
- 八女古墳群 (Japanese)
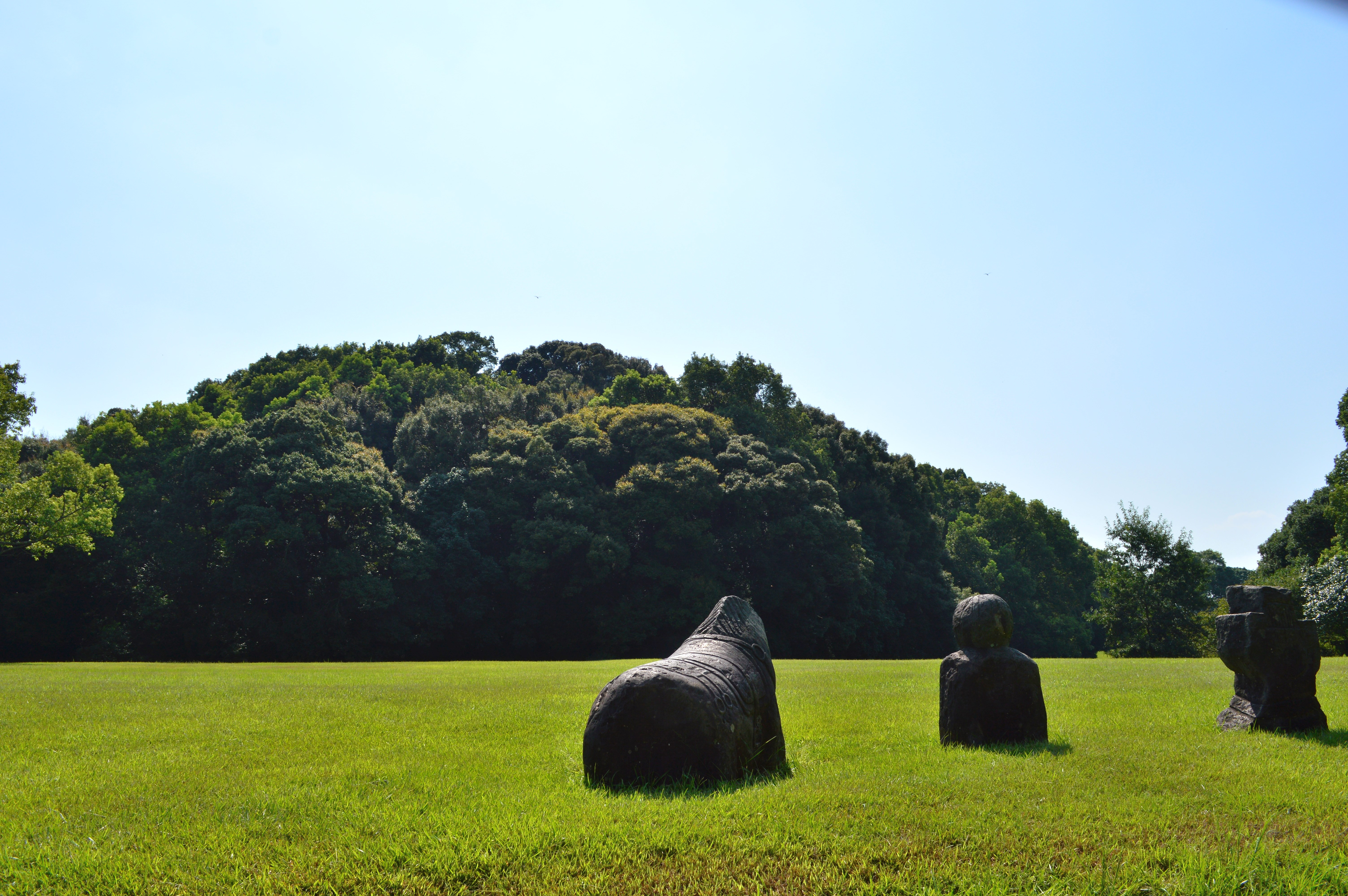
- Yame Kofun cluster

- Yame Kofun cluster Yame Kofun Cluster (Japan)
- Interactive map of Yame Kofun cluster
- 33°13′58″N 130°34′09″E
- Type: Kofun
- Periods: Kofun period
- Location: Yame, Hirokawa, Chikugo, Fukuoka, Japan
- Region: Kyushu

History
- Built: 6th century AD

Site notes
- Public access: Yes

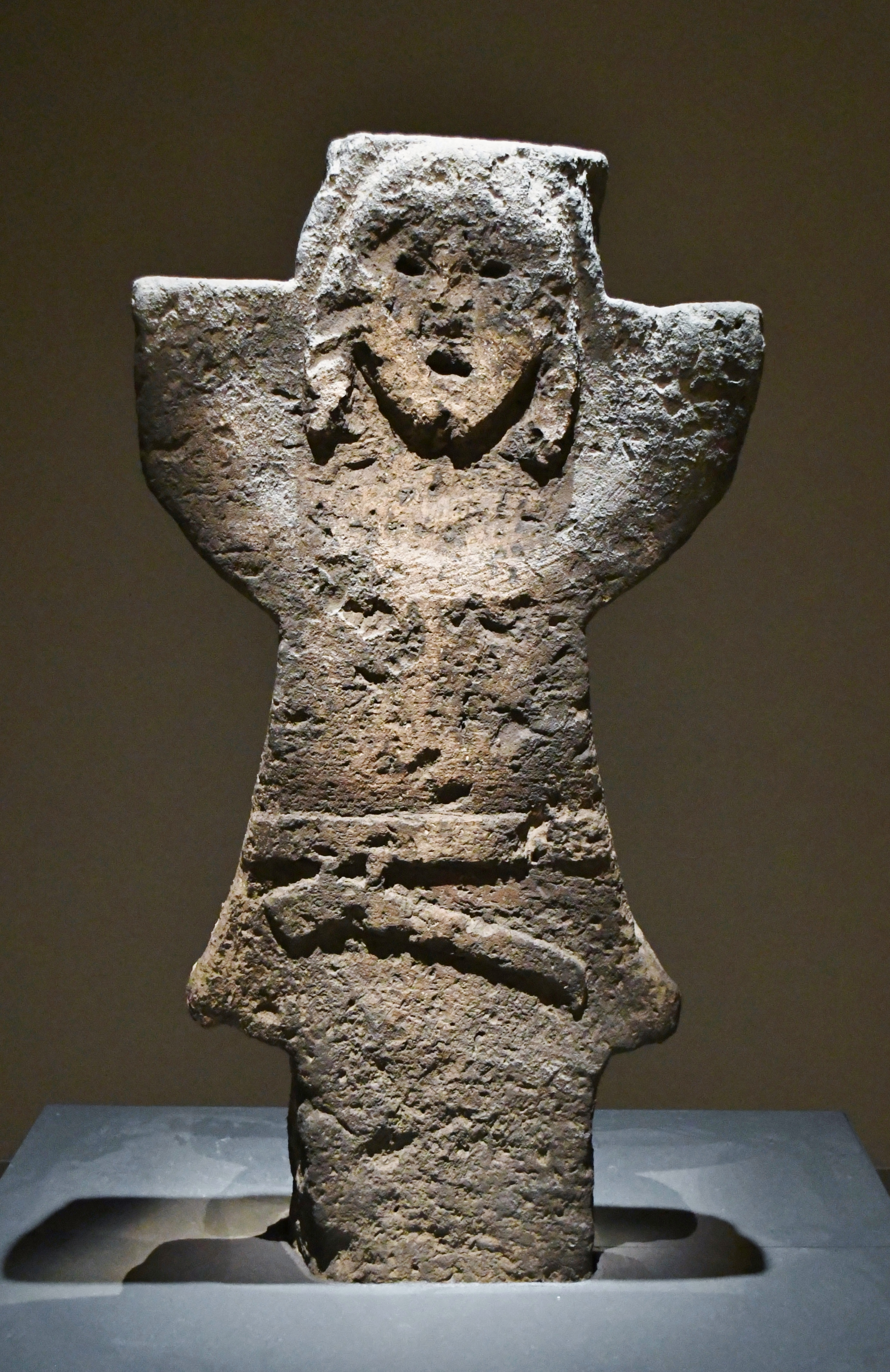
Stone warrior at Iwatoyama Kofun

The Yame Kofun cluster (八女古墳群, Yame Kofun-gun) is a group of kofun burial mounds located in the Yame hills, across the towns of Yame, Hirokawa, Chikugo, Fukuoka, Japan. The Noriba Kofun was designated a National Historic Site in 1922, followed by the Iwatoyama, Ishijinyama, Zenzōzuka, and Kōgadani Kofun on an individual basis. These five separate National Historic Sites were merged into a single site in 1978, and the Maruyamazuka, Maruyama, and Chausuzuka Kofun were added to the protected area.

== Overview ==
The Yame Kofun cluster consists of approximately 300 kofun built between the 4th and 7th centuries in Yame Hills. These are thought to be the tombs of the clan of Iwai, the ruler of Tsukushi, who were a powerful local in northern Kyushu mentioned in the Kojiki, Nihon Shoki and other ancient sources. In 527 AD, they were leaders of the Iwai Rebellion, to overthrow Yamato control.

=== Noriba Kofun ===
The Noriba Kofun is a two-tiered zenpō-kōen-fun (前方後円墳), which is shaped like a keyhole, having one square end and one circular end, when viewed from above, located approximately 300 meters east of Iwatoyama Kofun. It has a length of approximately 70 meters; the diameter of the rear circular portion is approximately 30 meters, the height is approximately five meters, and the width of the front portion is approximately 35 meters. According to Edo period accounts, the tumulus once had stone statues of warriors, but these have since disappeared; the surrounding moat and embankment are also missing. The burial facility is a horizontal passage with a multi-chamber structure. It is a decorated kofun. The back and side walls, which are made of large stones, and the stones on both sleeves of the burial chamber are decorated with continuous triangular patterns, concentric circles, and bracken hand patterns in red, yellow, and blue. The burial chamber is not open to the public for preservation reasons. It was opened in the early twentieth century and grave goods such as jade, horse harnesses, and Sue ware were discovered. These artifacts are now in the Tokyo National Museum, and a gilt-bronze-covered ring-headed iron sword pommel is in the Fukuoka Prefectural Fukushima High School. The tumulus is estimated to have been constructed in the mid-6th century based on the grave goods, decorative patterns, and burial chamber structure.

According to legend, as it is located next to the Iwatoyama Kofun, it is said to be the tomb of Kuzuko, a son of Iwai, the Prince of Tsukushi.

=== Iwatoyama Kofun ===
The Iwatoyama Kofun is a two-stage keyhole-shaped tumulus orientated to the west, with a 43-meter square projection on its northeast corner. The tumulus has a length of 135 meters, with a posterior circular diameter of 60 meters and a height of 18 meters, and an anterior rectangular width of 92 meters and a height of 17 meters. It is surrounded by a 20-meter-wide moat and embankment. It was built in the first half of the 6th century, based on the chronology of the Sue ware pottery, and this also matches the records in the "Kojiki" and "Nihonshoki" (as well as the of Chikugo no Kuni Fudoki) as the location of the grave of Iwai, the "Prince of Tsukushi" who led the Iwai Rebellion against the Yamato state. The main body of the tumulus has not been excavated, but electrical resistivity tomography (ERT) has confirmed a structure that is presumed to be a side-pit type stone burial chamber. The Iwatoyama Kofun is especially noted for its more than 100 stone statues, which have been unearthed from the mound and surrounding embankment, which depict near life-sized people, animals, and objects. This is unique in terms of both the number and variety of stone images. Two of the stone warriors are National Important Cultural Properties and are at the Tokyo National Museum, and two more; along with 60 other stone images (all also Important Cultural Properties) are at the Iwatoyama History and Culture Center on site.

=== Sekijinsan Kofun ===
The Sekijinsan Kofun is a keyhole-shaped tumulus that was held in legend to be the grave of Prince Iwai's father. The tumulus has a length of 107 meters, with a posterior circular diameter of 53 meters and height of 12 meters, and an anterior rectangular width of 63 meters and a height of 11 meters. It was constructed in two stages in the front and three stages in the rear., and parts of a surrounding moat and embankment survive on the west side of the anterior part and the east side of the posterior part. Based on the shape of the tomb and the age of the Sue ware pottery that was excavated, it is thought to have been built in the early to mid-5th century, and is thus the oldest in the cluster. In the center of the posterior circle is a horizontal-entry cave-style stone burial chamber made of flat masonry of chlorite schist, and a house-shaped sarcophagus. The lid is a hipped structure with a base length of 2.8 meters, and a rope hanging protrusion on the gable side. The body is made up of four stone slabs, and is 1.4 meters high and 2.3 meters long. The lid of the sarcophagus is embossed with a straight arc pattern and a double circle pattern, and is also painted red, which is important as the oldest known decorated tomb. The burial chamber was opened in the Edo period and any grave goods, as well as the ceiling have been lost. It is covered by a protective facility and can be viewed. The tumulus is also known for its stone warrior statue (Important Cultural Property) which is now enshrined with his back to the burial chamber. This stone statue is mentioned in Edo Period records, and is made of volcanic tuff from Mount Aso. It stands 1.8 meters tall, and is wearing triangular plate armor and is holding a sword. The face is eroded, as per local folklore, if people who had pain in their limbs, hips, shoulders, etc., rubbed or struck a spot on the statue corresponding to their sore area, it would be cured. This kofun should not be confused with the Sekijinsan Kofun (石神山古墳) in the city of Miyako, Fukuoka, which has the same name, but written in different kanji.

=== Kōgadani Kofun ===
The Kōgadani Kofun is a two-tiered circular enpun (円墳)-style tumulus measuring approximately 39 meters in diameter and 7 meters in height. The outer diameter, including the surrounding moat and embankment, reaches approximately 55 meters, making it the largest in the region. It was discovered by chance during the construction of an orchard in 1970. The burial facility is a horizontal-entry stone passage made of broken schist stones with a stone house-shaped burial chamber. The back and side walls are decorated with circles, concentric circles, triangular patterns, "bipedal-ring" patterns, and eyelids in red and green. One-third of the burial chamber was destroyed when the tomb was discovered, but it was later restored, a preservation facility was built, and the murals were protected. The bipedal-ring pattern is very rare, and there are only three other confirmed cases of this pattern, all of which are found in this region. In addition, the design of the chamber suggests a strong connection with the Higo region. The tumulus is estimated to have been constructed in the mid-6th century, slightly earlier than the Maruyamazuka Kofun. Currently, it is maintained as a park along with the adjacent Sekijinyama Kofun. The burial chamber is open to the public twice a year, in spring and autumn, and a replica of the burial chamber is on display at Kofunpia Hirokawa.

=== Zenzōzuka Kofun ===
The Zenzōzuka Kofun is a keyhole-shaped tumulus and the third largest in the cluster after Iwatoyama Kofun and Sekijinyama Kofun. The front part faces west, and the tomb is built in two stages and surrounded by fukiishi and haniwa. Judging from the style of the cylindrical haniwa, it appears to have been built in the early to mid-6th century.

=== Maruyamazuka Kofun ===
The Maruyamazuka Kofun is a large round tumulus measuring approximately 33 meters in diameter and 5.3 meters in height, and it is thought that originally there was a moat and embankment surrounding the mound. It is located 200 meters to the south of the Zenzōzuka Kofun and Chausuzuka Kofun. The burial facility is a double-sleeved, horizontal stone burial chamber measuring eight meters in total length and opening to the south. Like the Noriba Kofun, it has a multi-chambered structure with a front chamber and a back chamber, using large stones for the lower back and flat stones at the top, stacked in a dome shape. Additionally, the back walls, burial chambers, and front chamber sleeve stones are decorated with triangular patterns, circular patterns, and warabi patterns in red, yellow, and green. The burial chamber was backfilled after excavation for preservation purposes, and it is currently impossible to enter. The Maruyamazuka Kofun is thought to have been constructed around the latter half of the 6th century.

=== Chausuzuka Kofun ===
The Chausuzuka Tumulus is a circular kofun, measuring 24 meters in diameter and 5.3 meters in height. Judging from the appearance of the surrounding area, there is a possibility that a surrounding moat or embankment existed, but it is not clear. Due to grave robbery, the center of the mound has collapsed, but it is believed to have had a side-pit-type stone burial chamber. Although no excavations have been conducted, it appears that this tumulus was built around the latter half of the 6th century, based on the Sue ware and cylindrical haniwa found at the site.

Yame Kofun cluster
| Name | Location | Type | Size | Comments |
|---|---|---|---|---|
| Noriba (乗場古墳) | 33°13′51.8″N 130°33′26.7″E | zenpōkōenfun | 70m long | decorated |
| Iwatoyama (岩戸山古墳) | 33°13′47.49″N 130°33′9.77″E | zenpōkōenfun | 135m long | |
| Sekijinsan (石人山古墳) | 33°14′14.5″N 130°31′03.4″E | zenpōkōenfun | 107m long | decorated |
| Kōgadani (弘化谷古墳) | 33°14′11.9″N 130°31′11.4″E | circular | 39m dia | decorated |
| Zenzōzuka (善蔵塚古墳) | 33°14′02.4″N 130°34′04.2″E | zenpōkōenfun | 95m long | |
| Maruyamazuka (善蔵塚古墳) | 33°13′57.6″N 130°34′09.4″E | circular | 33m long | decorated |
| Chausuzuka (茶臼塚古墳) | 33°14′03.7″N 130°34′14.0″E | circular | 24m long | |

== Gallery ==
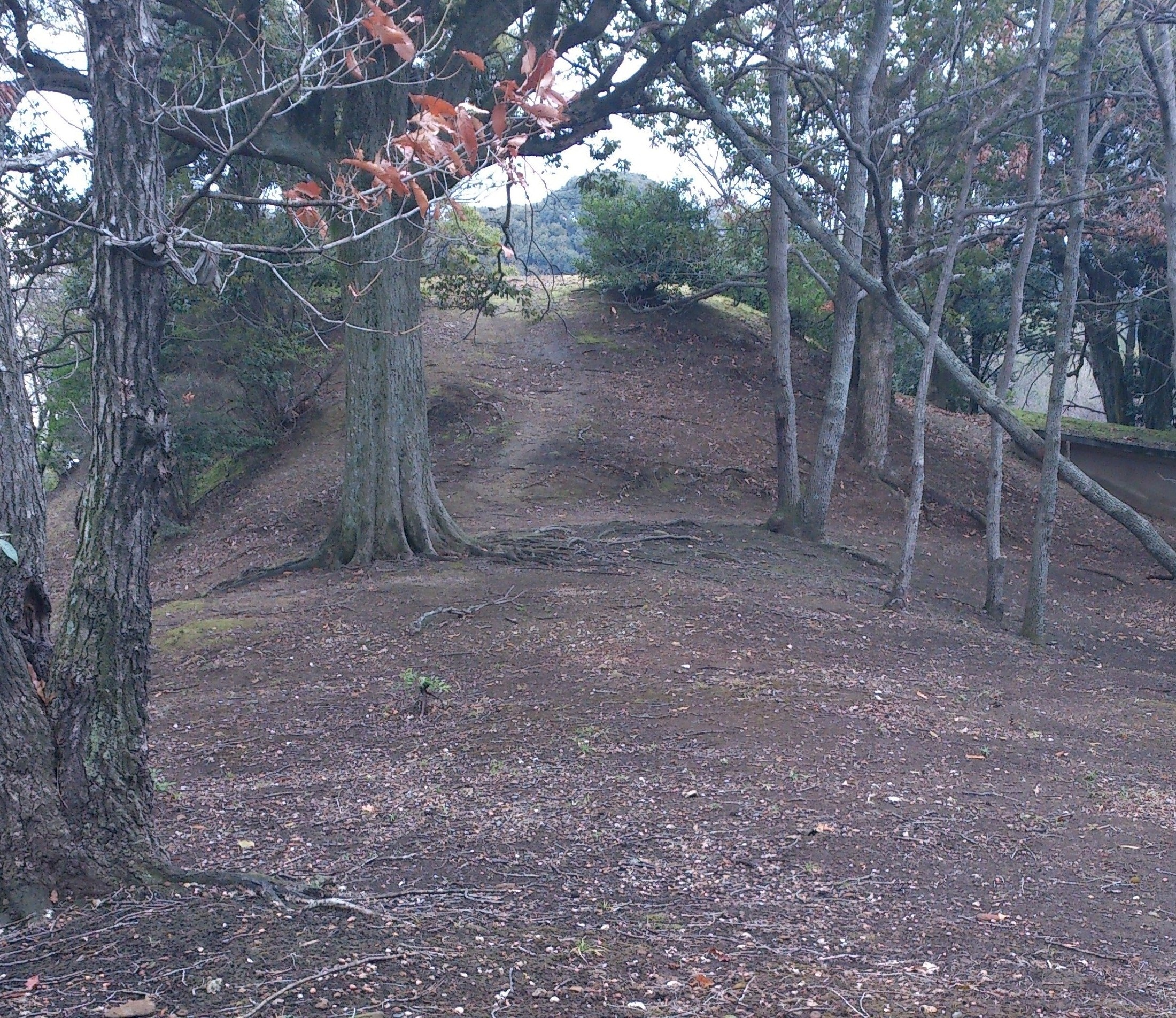
Noriba Kofun

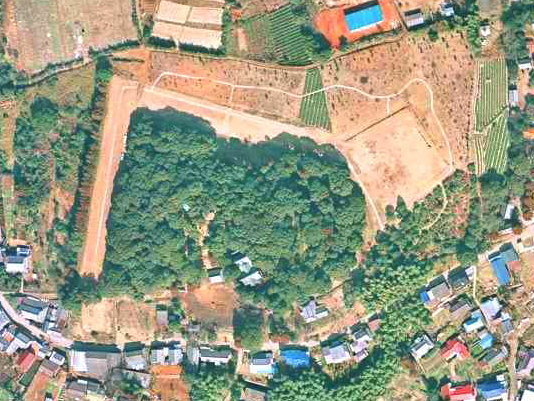
Iwatoyama Kofun

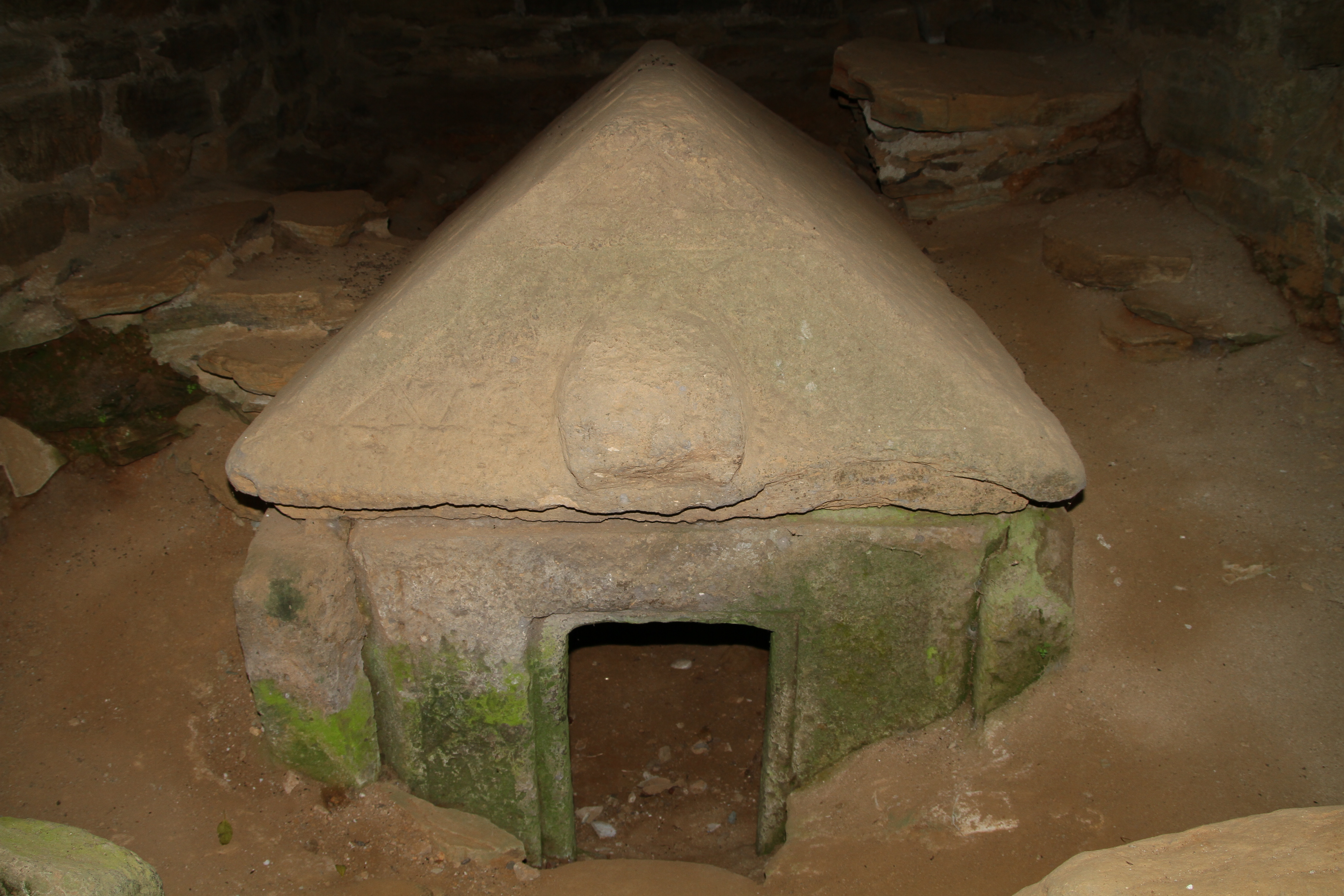
House-shaped sarcophagus in the Sekijinsan Kofun

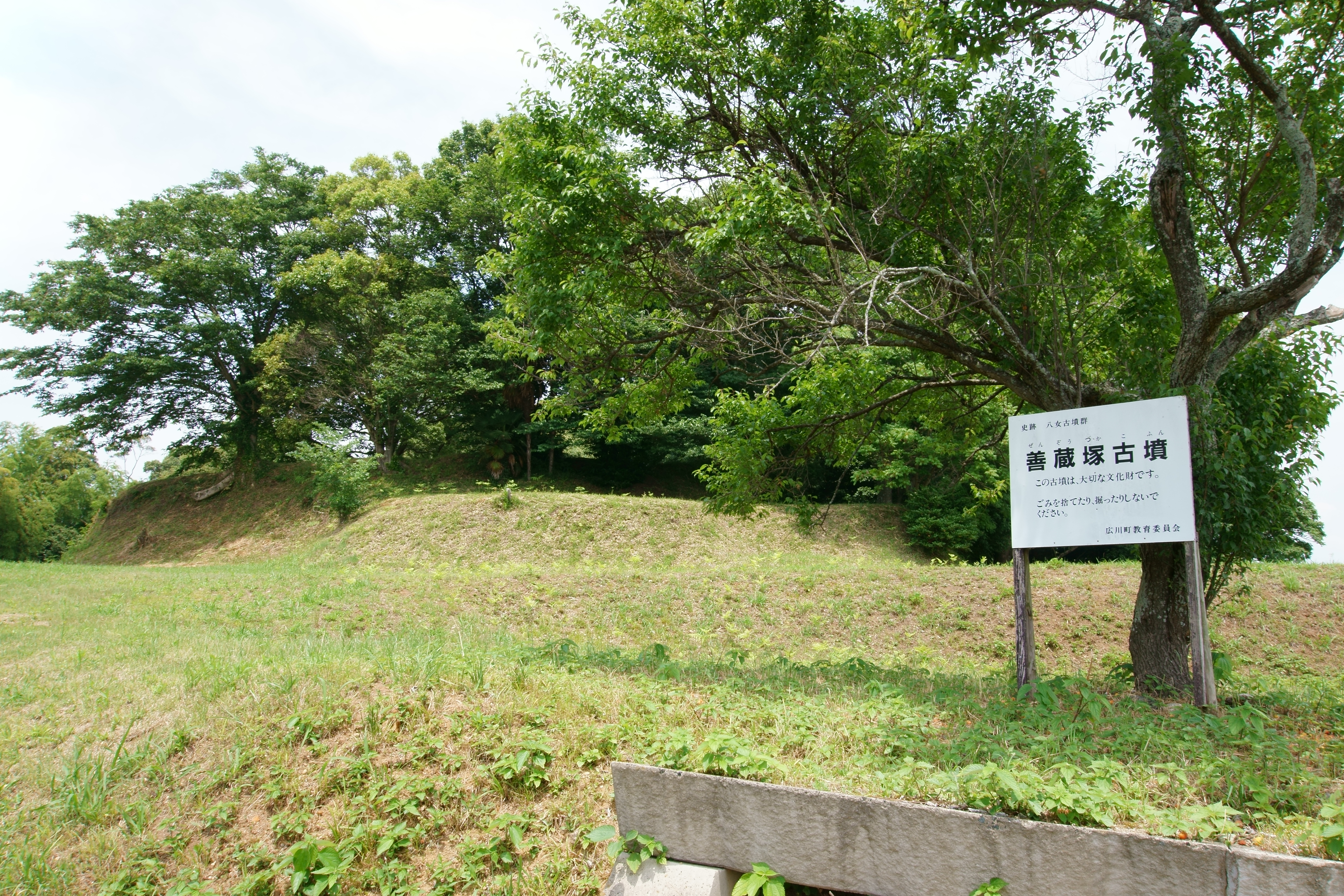
Zenzōzuka Kofun

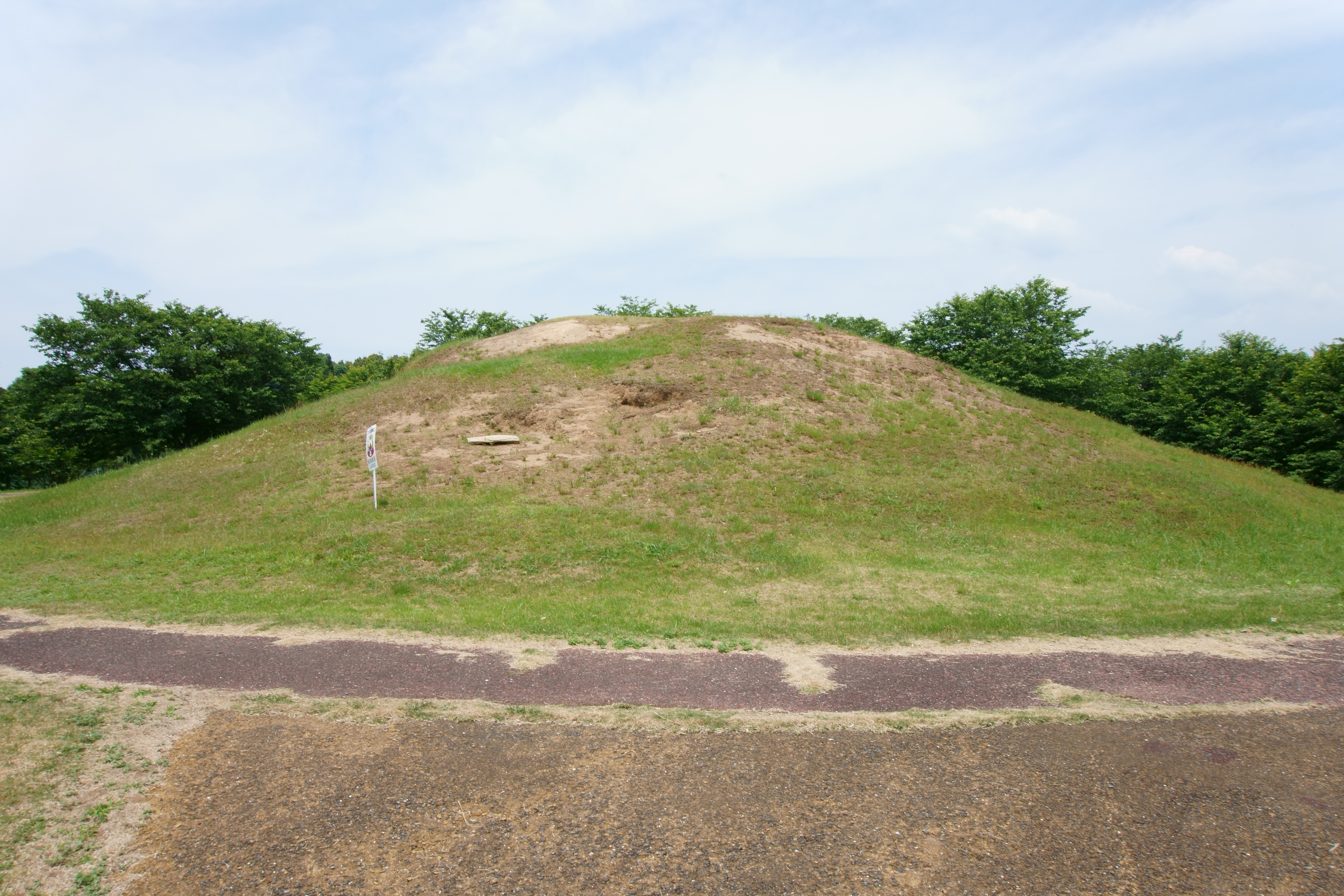
Maruyamazuka Kofun

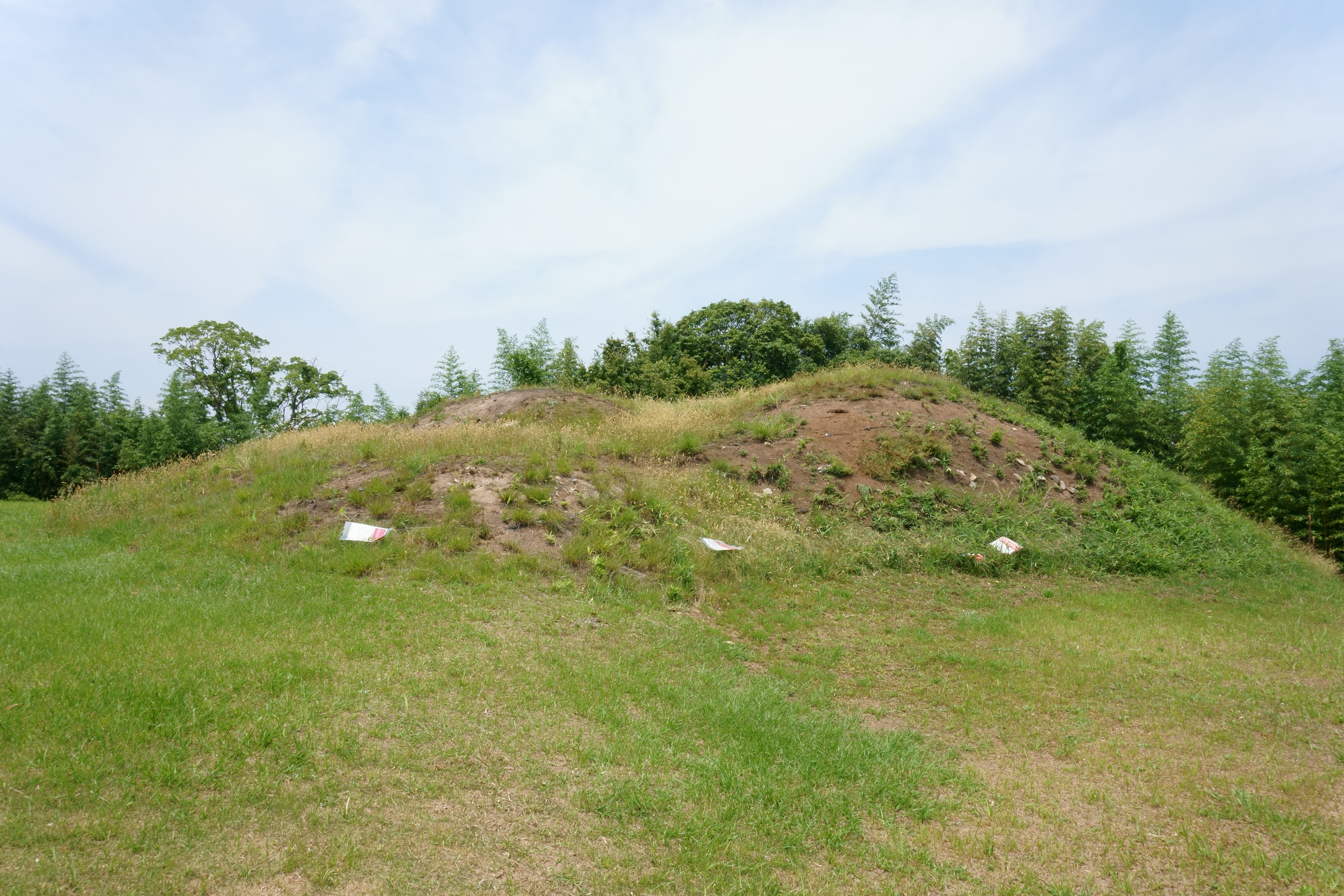
Chausuzuka Kofun

== See also ==
- List of Historic Sites of Japan (Fukuoka)
- Decorated kofun
