= Junichi Watanabe =

Japanese doctor and author (1933–2014)

- Born: 渡辺淳一; 24 October 1933; Kamisunagawa, Hokkaido, Japan
- Died: 30 April 2014 (aged 80); Tokyo, Japan
- Education: Sapporo Medical University
- Occupations: Medical doctor; writer
- Notable work: A Lost Paradise
- Spouse: Toshiko Horiuchi

Jun'ichi Watanabe (渡辺 淳一, Watanabe Jun'ichi; 24 October 1933 – 30 April 2014) was a Japanese medical doctor and writer.

== Biography ==
Jun'ichi Watanabe was born in Kamisunagawa, Hokkaido, Japan. His interest in literature was inspired by the death of a high school classmate whom he loved. He published his first works while studying at Sapporo Medical University, from which he graduated in 1958. He specialised in orthopedic surgery, while at the same time writing medical, historical, and biographical novels. Following the scandal ensuing from the first heart transplant performed in Japan, in 1968, Watanabe left the medical profession and concentrated on writing.

He wrote more than 50 novels in total and won several awards, including the 1970 Naoki Prize for Hikari to kage (lit. "light and shadow"), and the Yoshikawa Eiji Prize in 1979 for Toki rakujitsu ("the setting sun in the distance") and Nagasaki roshia yujokan ("the Russian brothel of Nagasaki"). He gained wide attention with a series of sexually explicit novels, including the 1997 bestseller A Lost Paradise, which was made into a film and a TV miniseries.

Watanabe died on 30 April 2014 of prostate cancer in Tokyo.

== Publications ==
=== Works in English translation ===
- 1969: "Invitation to Suicide" In: Autumn Wind and Other Stories
- 1970: Beyond the Blossoming Fields
- 1997: A Lost Paradise
- 2009: Beyond the Blossoming Fields

=== Works in French translation ===
- 2021: Château Rouge

=== Works in Spanish translation ===
- 2009: Ginko. La Primera Doctora

== Selected awards ==
- 1965 (Showa 40) – 12th Shincho Literary Award – Death Makeup
- 1970 (Showa 45) – 63rd Naoki Prize – Light and Shadow
- 1979 (Showa 54) – 14th Yoshikawa Eiji Literature Award – Distant Setting Sun and Nagasaki Russian Courtesan Hall
- 1983 (Showa 58) – 48th Bungeishunju Reader's Award – Voice of Silence: The Life of Mrs. Nogi Nokibe
- 2003 Order of the Sacred Treasure, Purple Ribbon
- 2001 Knight's Cross of the Order of the Falcon (Iceland, 16 October 2001): Presented at the opening of the Embassy of Iceland in Japan.
