= A Lost Paradise =

1997 novel by Junichi Watanabe

- First edition (1997)
- Author: Junichi Watanabe
- Original title: 失楽園 (Shitsurakuen)
- Translator: Juliet Winters Carpenter
- Language: Japanese
- Genre: Novel
- Publisher: Kodansha
- Publication date: 1997
- Publication place: Japan
- English publication date: 2000
- Media type: Print (paperback)
- Pages: 372 pp
- ISBN: 4-7700-2324-3

A Lost Paradise (失楽園, Shitsurakuen) is a 1997 Japanese novel by author Junichi Watanabe. It tells the story of a married, former magazine editor aged 54; his affair with a married 37-year-old typesetter and their double-suicide. The couple, Kūki and Rinko, are modeled after the famous case of Sada Abe.

The book became a bestseller throughout Asia, selling 3 million copies in Japan. Shitsurakuen became a slang word for having an affair. It was first serialized in the business newspaper Nihon Keizai Shimbun in 1995. The book was made into a film and a TV drama the same year. The film, Lost Paradise, was nominated for 13 Japan Academy Prizes winning one with Hitomi Kuroki for lead actress.
