= Yame District, Fukuoka =

District in Fukuoka prefecture, Japan

Coordinates: 33.2513°N 130.561°E

Location of Yame District in Fukuoka Prefecture

Yame (八女郡, Yame-gun) is a district located in Fukuoka Prefecture, Japan.

As of April 1, 2010, the district has an estimated population of 20,230 and a density of 534 persons per km^{2}. The total area is 37.91 km^{2}.

== Towns and villages ==
- Hirokawa

== Mergers ==
- On October 1, 2006, the town of Jōyō merged into the city of Yame.
- On February 1, 2010, the towns of Kurogi and Tachibana, and the villages of Yabe and Hoshino merged into the city of Yame.
