= Lost Paradise (film) =

- Film poster
- Directed by: Yoshimitsu Morita
- Screenplay by: Kyoko Morinaga
- Based on: A Lost Paradise by Junichi Watanabe
- Produced by: Masato Hara
- Starring: Koji Yakusho; Hitomi Kuroki
- Cinematography: Hiroshi Takase
- Edited by: Shinji Tanaka
- Music by: Michiru Ōshima
- Distributed by: Toei
- Release date: 10 May 1997 (Japan)
- Running time: 119 minutes
- Country: Japan
- Language: Japanese
- Box office: ¥2.3 billion (Japan)

Lost Paradise (Japanese: 失楽園, Hepburn: Shitsurakuen) is a 1997 Japanese drama film directed by Yoshimitsu Morita. It is based on the novel A Lost Paradise by Junichi Watanabe.

== Cast ==
- Koji Yakusho - Shoichiro Kuki
- Hitomi Kuroki - Rinko Matsubara
- Akira Terao - Kinugawa
- Toshio Shiba - Haruhiko Matsubara
- Tomoko Hoshino - Fumie Kuki (wife)
- Yoshino Kimura - Chika (daughter)
- Kazuya Kosaka - Suzuki
- Morio Agata - Yokoyama
- Kenjirō Ishimaru - Muramatsu
- Chiaki Hara - Ms. Miyata
- Kumija Kim (as Kumiko Kim) - Midori
- Jun Murakami - Toru

== Release ==
Lost Paradise was the second highest grossing Japanese film of 1997 domestically, being only beaten by Princess Mononoke. It grossed a total of 2.3 billion yen.
