= Hirokawa, Fukuoka =

Hirokawa 広川町
- Town
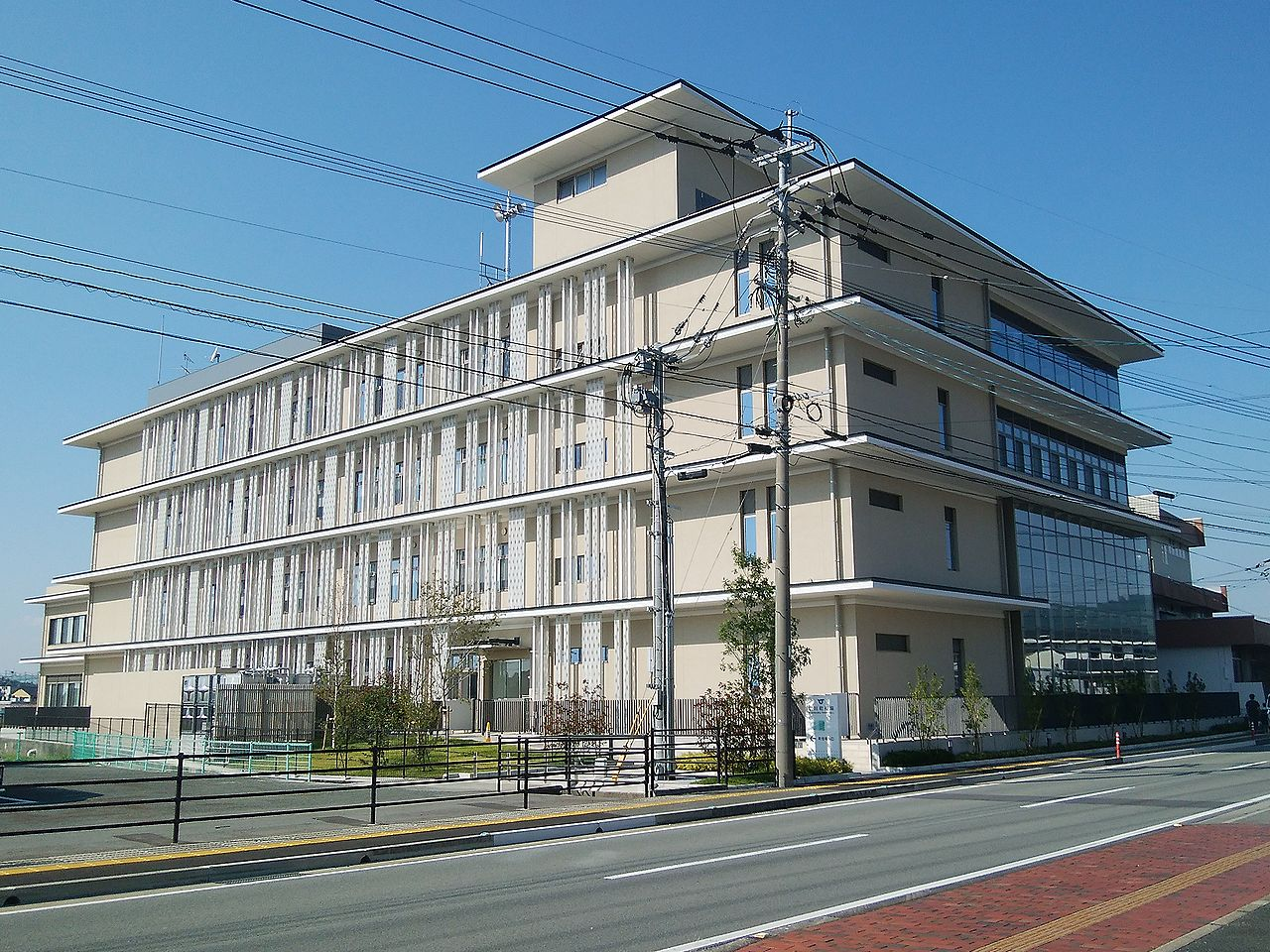
- Hirokawa Town Hall

- Flag Emblem
- Interactive map of Hirokawa
- Location in Japan
- Coordinates: 33°14′30″N 130°33′05″E
- Country: Japan
- Region: Kyushu
- Prefecture: Fukuoka
- District: Yame

Area
  - Total: 37.94 km^{2} (14.65 sq mi)

Population (February 1, 2024)
  - Total: 19,215
  - Density: 506.5/km^{2} (1,312/sq mi)
- Time zone: UTC+09:00 (JST)
- City hall address: 1804-1 Shindai, Hirokawa-cho, Yame-gun, Fukuoka-ken 834-0115
- Website: Official website
- Symbols
- Bird: Japanese bush warbler
- Flower: Wisteria floribunda
- Tree: Sakura

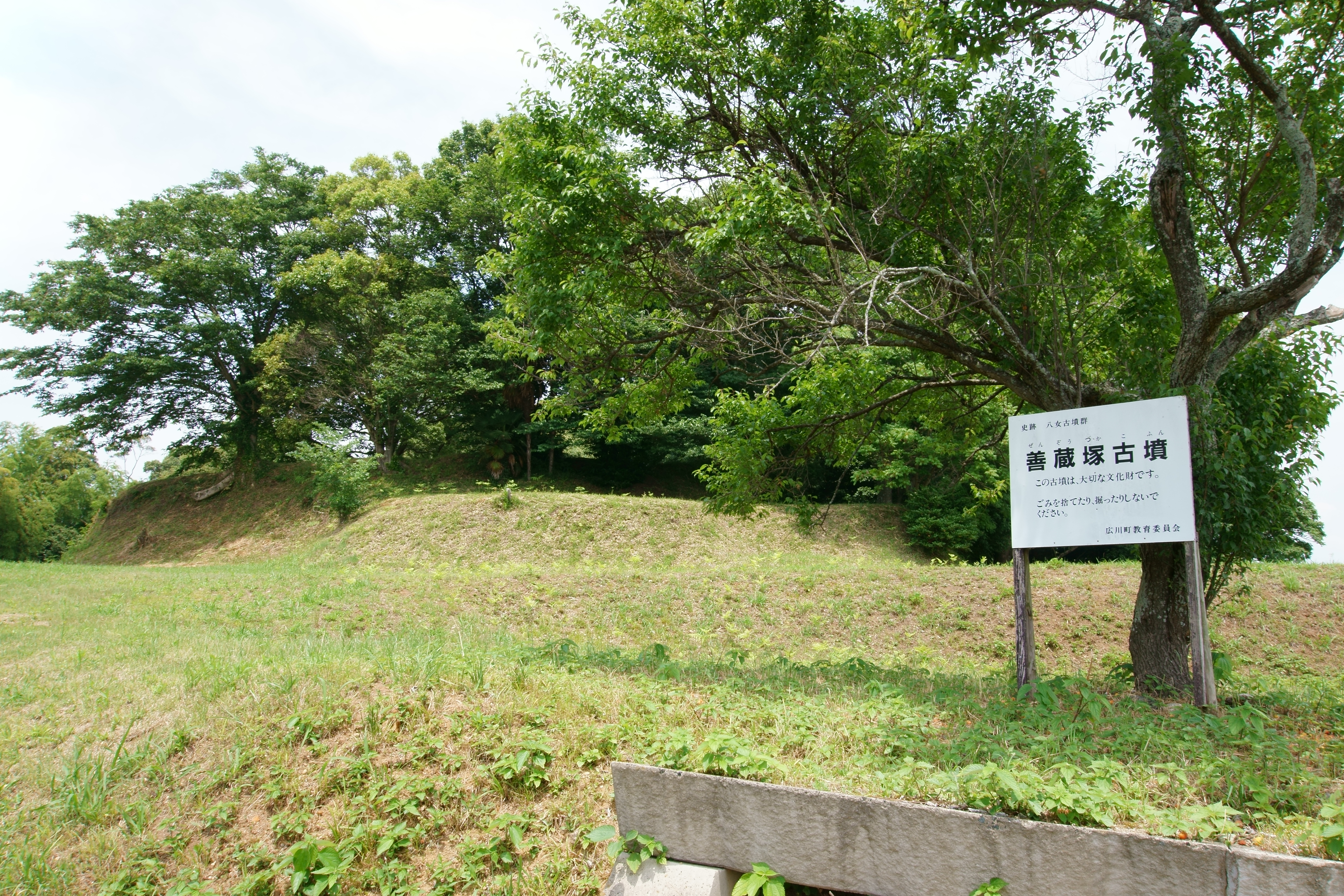
Zenzozuka Kofun

Hirokawa (広川町, Hirokawa-machi) is a town located in Yame District, Fukuoka Prefecture, Japan. As of 1 January 2024, the town had an estimated population of 19,215 in 8186 households, and a population density of 510 persons per km^{2}. The total area of the town is 37.94 km^{2} (14.65 sq mi).

== Geography ==
Hirokawa is located in an inland area of southern Fukuoka Prefecture. The western part of the town is on the eastern edge of the Chikugo Plain, and is close to the urban areas of Kurume and Yame.The eastern part of the town is a mountainous area with traditional hamlets.

=== Neighboring municipalities ===
Fukuoka Prefecture

- Chikugo
- Kurume
- Yame

=== Climate ===
Hirokawa has a humid subtropical climate (Köppen Cfa) characterized by warm summers and cool winters with light to no snowfall. The average annual temperature in Hirokawa is 15.4 °C. The average annual rainfall is 1946 mm with September as the wettest month. The temperatures are highest on average in August, at around 26.5 °C, and lowest in January, at around 4.6 °C.

=== Demographics ===
Per Japanese census data, the population of Hirokawa is as shown below

Historical population
Year	Pop.	±%
1960	15,833	—
1970	15,065	−4.9%
1980	17,154	+13.9%
1990	18,629	+8.6%
2000	19,779	+6.2%
2010	20,253	+2.4%
2020	19,951	−1.5%

== History ==
The area of Hirokawa was part of ancient Buzen Province. During the Edo Period, the area was part of the holdings of Kokura Domain. The villages of Kamihirokawa, Nakahirokawa and Shimohirokawa were established on May 1, 1889, with the creation of the modern municipalities system. On April 1, 1955, Kamihirokawa and Nakahirokawa Ueno merged to form the town of Hirokawa. Parts of Shimohirokawa were added on December 1, 1955.

== Government ==
Hirokawa has a mayor-council form of government with a directly elected mayor and a unicameral town council of 13 members. Hirokawa, collectively with the city of Yame, contributes two members to the Fukuoka Prefectural Assembly. In terms of national politics, the town is part of the Fukuoka 7th district of the lower house of the Diet of Japan.

== Economy ==
The economy of Hirokawa was traditionally based on agriculture, with products including strawberries, grapes, pears, and Yamecha tea. After plans to merge with either neighboring Kurume or Yame failed to gain popular support, the town developed an industrial park next to the Hirokawa Interchange on the Kyushu Expressway,

== Education ==
Hirokawa has four public elementary high schools and one public junior high school operated by the town government. The town does not have a high school.

== Transportation ==
=== Railways ===
Hirokawa does not have any passenger railway service. Buses connect to the town from Nishitetsu Kurume Station, Hanabatake Station, and JR Kyushu Kurume Station. JR Kyushu Nishimuta Station and Nishitetsu Daizenji Station are close to the western part of the town and are accessible in about 15 minutes by car

=== Highways ===
- Kyushu Expressway
- National Route 3

== Sister cities ==
- Wujiang, Suzhou, China, friendship city

== Notable people from Hirokawa ==
- Tatsuya Maruyama, politician
- Kuniyoshi Noda, politician
