= Yame =

Yame 八女市
- City
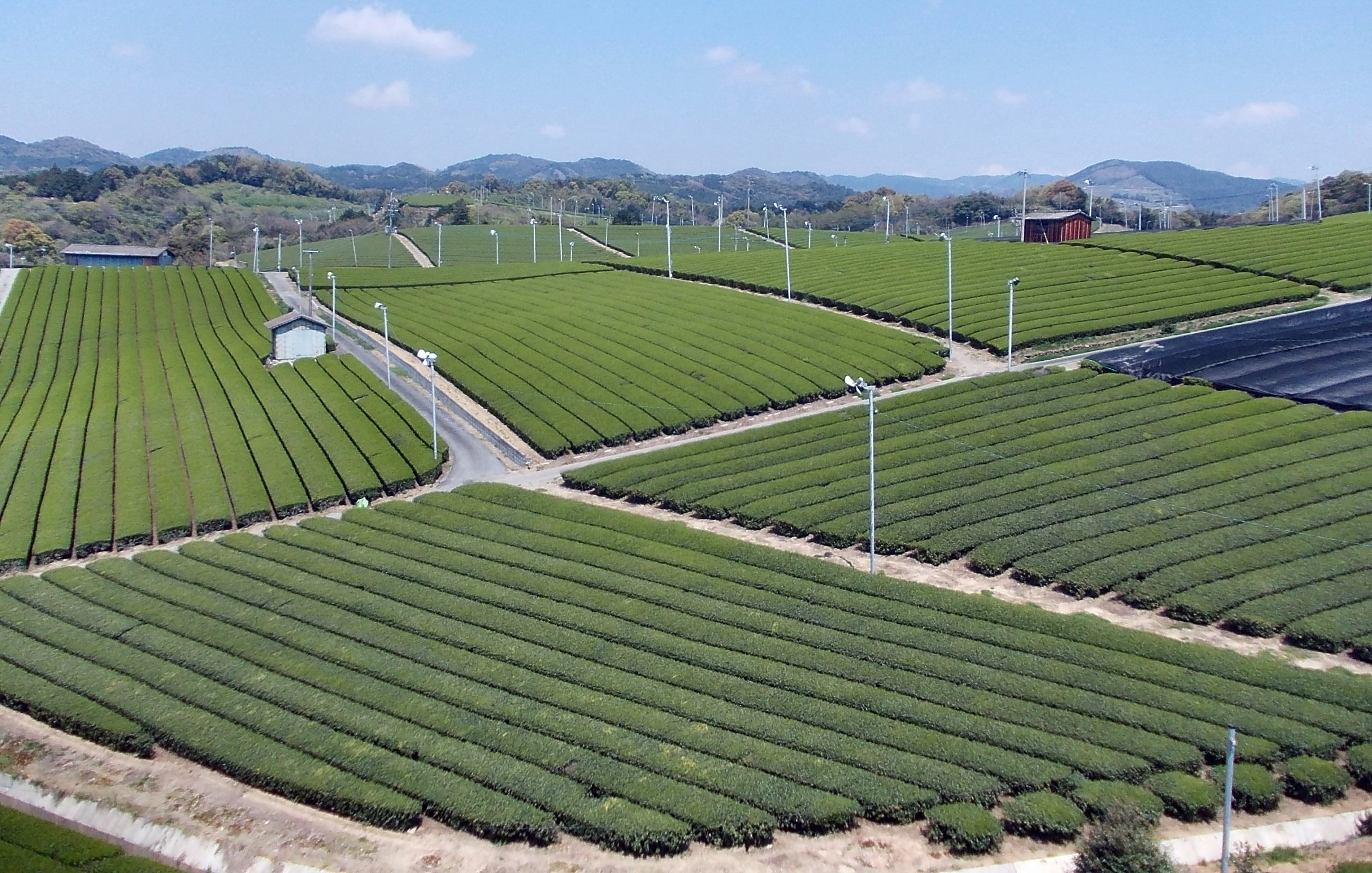
- Yame Tea Plantation

- Flag Seal
- Location of Yame in Fukuoka Prefecture

- Location in Japan
- Coordinates: 33°12′43″N 130°33′28″E
- Country: Japan
- Region: Kyushu
- Prefecture: Fukuoka

Government
  - Mayor: Yutaro Minohara (since November 2024)

Area
  - Total: 482.44 km^{2} (186.27 sq mi)

Population (31 December 2023)
  - Total: 37,782
  - Density: 78.314/km^{2} (202.83/sq mi)
- Time zone: UTC+09:00 (JST)
- City hall address: Honmachi 647, Yame-shi, Fukuoka-ken 834-8585
- Climate: Cfa
- Website: Official website
- Symbols
- Flower: Chrysanthemum, Wisteria, Hymenanthes
- Tree: Tea, Cinnamonum camphora

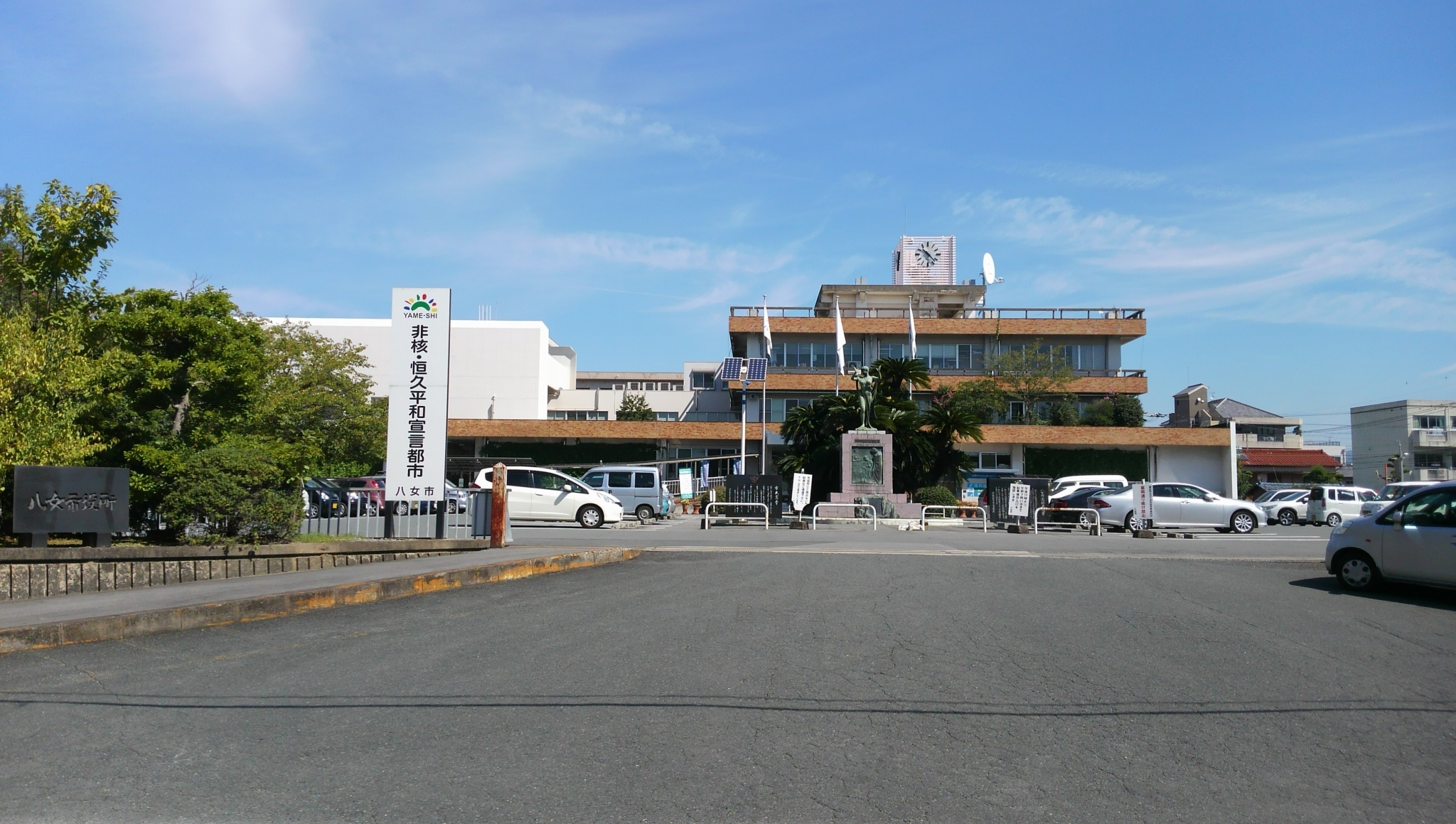
Yame City Hall

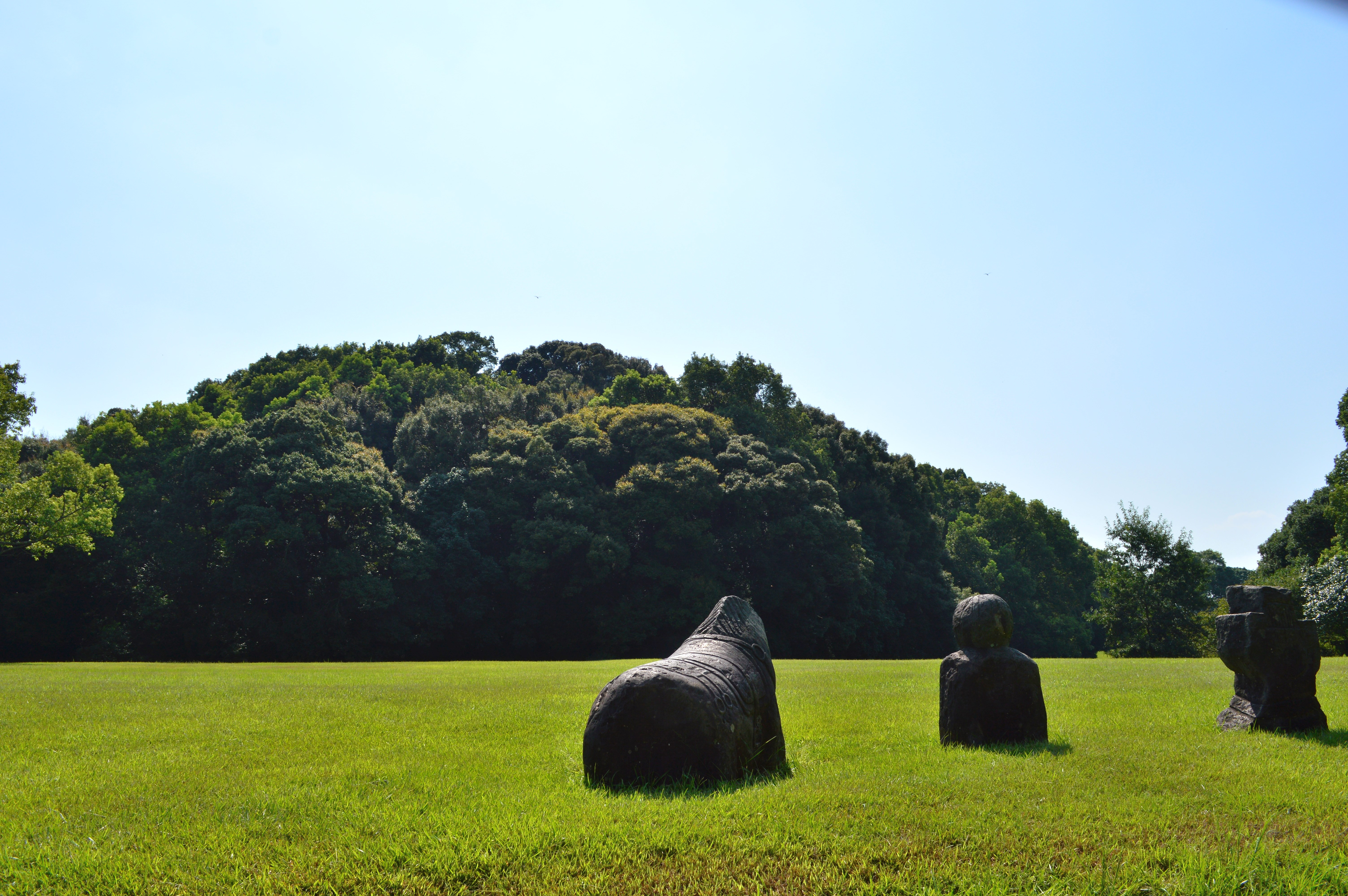
Iwatoyama Kofun

Yame (八女市, Yame-shi) is a city located in Fukuoka Prefecture, Japan. As of 31 December 2023, the city had an estimated population of 37,782 in 16050 households, and a population density of 240 persons per km^{2}. The total area of the city is 482.44 km^{2} (186.27 sq mi). Yamecha is produced in Yame and surrounding areas, and is a tea known throughout Japan.

== Geography ==
Yame is located in mountainous southern Fukuoka Prefecture bordering Ōita Prefecture and Kumamoto Prefecture. The Class A Yabe River, which flows from Mount Mikuni on the prefectural border, flows through Yabe into the Ariake Sea. The land has a basin-like topography.

=== Neighboring municipalities ===
Fukuoka Prefecture

- Chikugo
- Hirokawa
- Kurume
- Miyama
- Ukiha

Kumamoto Prefecture

- Nagomi
- Yamaga

Ōita Prefecture

- Hita

=== Climate ===
Yame has a humid subtropical climate (Köppen: Cfa). The average annual temperature in Yame is 15.4 °C (59.7 °F). The average annual rainfall is 2,058.1 mm (81.03 in) with July as the wettest month. The temperatures are highest on average in August, at around 26.7 °C (80.1 °F), and lowest in January, at around 4.1 °C (39.4 °F). The highest temperature ever recorded in Yame was 39.5 °C (103.1 °F) on 3 August 2026; the coldest temperature ever recorded was −7.9 °C (17.8 °F) on 25 January 2016.

Climate data for Kurogi, Yame (1991−2020 normals, extremes 1977−present)
Month	Jan	Feb	Mar	Apr	May	Jun	Jul	Aug	Sep	Oct	Nov	Dec	Year
Record high °C (°F)	20.9 (69.6)	23.3 (73.9)	25.4 (77.7)	30.8 (87.4)	34.8 (94.6)	36.3 (97.3)	39.2 (102.6)	39.5 (103.1)	37.4 (99.3)	33.5 (92.3)	29.1 (84.4)	23.9 (75.0)	39.5 (103.1)
Mean daily maximum °C (°F)	9.4 (48.9)	11.2 (52.2)	14.9 (58.8)	20.4 (68.7)	25.2 (77.4)	27.4 (81.3)	31.0 (87.8)	32.4 (90.3)	28.9 (84.0)	23.7 (74.7)	17.7 (63.9)	11.6 (52.9)	21.2 (70.1)
Daily mean °C (°F)	4.1 (39.4)	5.4 (41.7)	8.8 (47.8)	13.9 (57.0)	18.7 (65.7)	22.3 (72.1)	26.0 (78.8)	26.7 (80.1)	23.2 (73.8)	17.5 (63.5)	11.7 (53.1)	6.1 (43.0)	15.4 (59.7)
Mean daily minimum °C (°F)	−0.5 (31.1)	0.3 (32.5)	3.3 (37.9)	7.8 (46.0)	12.7 (54.9)	18.0 (64.4)	22.3 (72.1)	22.5 (72.5)	18.8 (65.8)	12.5 (54.5)	6.6 (43.9)	1.4 (34.5)	10.5 (50.8)
Record low °C (°F)	−7.9 (17.8)	−7.4 (18.7)	−5.1 (22.8)	−2.6 (27.3)	3.9 (39.0)	7.3 (45.1)	13.5 (56.3)	14.0 (57.2)	6.2 (43.2)	0.9 (33.6)	−2.2 (28.0)	−5.5 (22.1)	−7.9 (17.8)
Average precipitation mm (inches)	59.0 (2.32)	83.3 (3.28)	129.9 (5.11)	151.7 (5.97)	183.8 (7.24)	388.5 (15.30)	414.3 (16.31)	227.1 (8.94)	182.2 (7.17)	86.7 (3.41)	87.2 (3.43)	64.6 (2.54)	2,058.1 (81.03)
Average precipitation days (≥ 1.0 mm)	8.6	8.8	11.0	10.5	9.7	13.9	13.7	11.1	9.8	6.7	8.1	8.3	120.2
Mean monthly sunshine hours	116.8	129.7	162.0	183.1	192.9	121.8	161.9	197.3	166.9	177.2	143.4	124.3	1,877.4
Source: Japan Meteorological Agency

=== Demographics ===
Per Japanese census data, the population of Yame in 2020 is 60,608 people. Yame has been conducting censuses since 1950.

Historical population
Year	Pop.	±%
1950	105,194	—
1955	105,820	+0.6%
1960	101,573	−4.0%
1965	93,353	−8.1%
1970	88,888	−4.8%
1975	85,736	−3.5%
1980	85,078	−0.8%
1985	84,556	−0.6%
1990	81,895	−3.1%
1995	79,492	−2.9%
2000	76,689	−3.5%
2005	73,262	−4.5%
2010	69,053	−5.7%
2015	64,408	−6.7%
2020	60,608	−5.9%
Yame population statistics

== History ==
The area of Yame was part of ancient Chikugo Province. It has been inhabited since ancient times, and many ruins from the Jōmon period to the Yayoi period have been discovered, as well as more than 300 kofun burial mounds from the Kofun period. A powerful ancient state existed in the Yame region, and it was the center of the Iwai Rebellion of 527 AD against the Yamato court. The Iwatoyama Kofun, located in northern Yame, is said to be the tomb of the leader of that rebellion and is the largest keyhole-shaped tumulus in northern Kyushu. During the Edo Period, Fukushima Castle in Yame was one of the largest flatland-style Japanese castles in the region and had a three-story tenshu. It was destroyed in 1615 after the area became part of Kurume Domain, but the jōkamachi survived to be one of the largest merchant towns within Kurume Domain. Many traditional buildings from the Edo period to modern times remain along the streets, mainly lacquered houses. After the Meiji restoration, the town of Fukushima was established on 1 May 1889 with the creation of the modern municipalities system. In 1943, during World War II, Fukushima was proposed as a site for relocating the capital of Japan.

On 1 April 1954 was raised to city status.. Initially, it was planned to name the city "Chikugo-Fukushima," but due to possible confusion with neighbouring Chikugo city, it was decided to name the city "Yame" instead. At that time, there was a strong opposition to the name from the residents of the former Fukushima town.

On 1 October 2006 the town of Jōyō (from Yame District) was merged into Yame. On 1 February 2010, the towns of Kurogi and Tachibana, and the villages of Hoshino and Yabe (all from Yame District) were merged into Yame.

== Government ==
Yame has a mayor-council form of government with a directly elected mayor and a unicameral city council of 22 members. Yame, collectively with the town of Hirokawa, contributes three members to the Fukuoka Prefectural Assembly. In terms of national politics, the city is part of the Fukuoka 7th district of the lower house of the Diet of Japan.

== Economy ==
The economy of Yame is overwhelmingly based on agriculture. Yame is a center of traditional craft industries and its total production of traditional crafts is the largest in Kyushu. These include washi paper, and various Chōchin lanterns, Butsudan, and Japanese umbrellas, and Tōrō lantern made from tuff from Mount Aso.

== Education ==
Yame has 13 public elementary schools, eight public junior high schools and two vocational training schools operated by the city government. The city has two public high schools operated by the Fukuoka Prefectural Board of Education. There are also one private junior high and two private high schools.

== Transportation ==
=== Railways ===
Yame no longer has any passenger railway service. The nearest train stations to the city are JR Kyushu Hainuzuka Station or Nishitetsu Kurume Station, the former of which is about 20 minutes away from Fukushima in the city center by bus. The latter is about 30 minutes by bus.

=== Highways ===
- Kyushu Expressway
- National Route 3
- National Route 442

== Local attractions ==
=== National Historic Sites ===
- Yame Kofun Cluster

== Notable people from Yame ==
- Yasuyuki Eda, politician
- Takafumi Horie, entrepreneur, founder of Livedoor
- Hitomi Kuroki, actress
- Eisuke Nakazono, novelist
- Akiko Sugimoto, novelist
