= 800 Series Shinkansen =

Japanese high speed train type

800 series
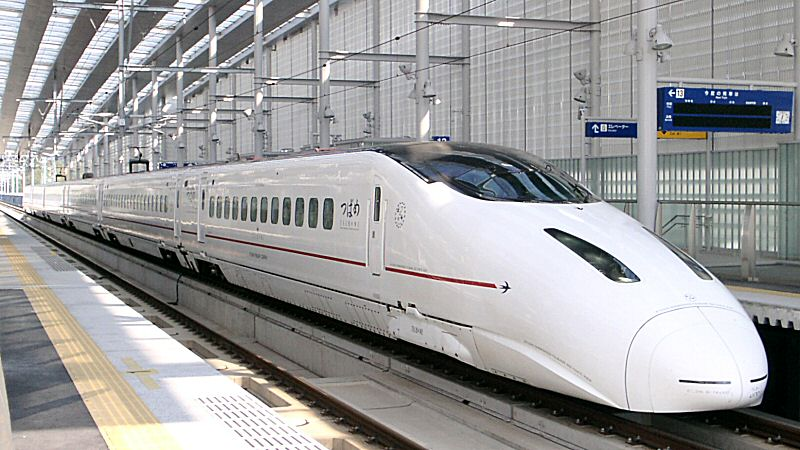
- 800 Series Shinkansen Tsubame at Shin-Minamata Station in November 2004
- Stock type: Electric multiple unit
- In service: 13 March 2004; 22 years ago – present
- Manufacturer: Hitachi
- Designer: Eiji Mitooka
- Number built: 54 vehicles (9 sets)
- Number in service: 48 vehicles (8 sets)
- Number preserved: 1 vehicle from set U005
- Number scrapped: 5 vehicles (set U005, earthquake damage, with exception of lead car)
- Formation: 6 cars per trainset
- Fleet numbers: U001–U009
- Capacity: Original sets: 392 (Standard class only), New sets: 384
- Operator: JR Kyushu
- Depot: Kumamoto
- Line served: Kyushu Shinkansen

Specifications
- Car body construction: Aluminium
- Car length: 25,000 mm (82 ft 0 in) (intermediate cars); 27,350 mm (89 ft 9 in) (end cars)
- Width: 3,380 mm (11 ft 1 in)
- Height: 3,650 mm (12 ft 0 in)
- Maximum speed: 260 km/h (160 mph)
- Acceleration: 2.5 km/(h⋅s) (1.6 mph/s)
- Electric system: 25 kV 60 Hz AC (overhead catenary)
- Current collection: Pantograph
- Safety system: KS-ATC
- Track gauge: 1,435 mm (4 ft 8 1/2 in) standard gauge

The 800 series (800系, Happyaku-kei) is a Japanese Shinkansen high-speed train type operated by Kyushu Railway Company (JR Kyushu) on the Kyushu Shinkansen high-speed rail line. Built by Hitachi, the trains were introduced on the all-stops Tsubame services from March 2004.

The 800 series has a maximum speed of 260 km/h (162 mph) in service, although its maximum design speed is 285 km/h (177 mph). It was one of the two recipients of the 45th Laurel Prize awarded by the Japan Railfan Club in 2005.

It abandoned the 700's "duckbill" nose in favor of a sharper nose. The livery is white, with a red stripe.

Following the opening of the entire Kyushu Shinkansen route on 12 March 2011, 800 series trains were primarily used on all-stations Tsubame services operating mostly between Hakata and Kumamoto. They also operate some Sakura services within the Kyushu Shinkansen.

== Formation ==
Car No.	1	2	3	4	5	6
Designation	Msc	Mp	M2w	M2	Mpw	Mc
Numbering	821	826	827	827-100	826-100	822-100
Seating capacity	46	80	72	72	66	56

Cars 2 and 5 are equipped with PS207K single-arm pantographs.

== Build history ==
Set number	Date delivered	Withdrawn
U001	30 August 2003	
U002	16 September 2003	
U003	6 October 2003	
U004	11 December 2003	
U005	28 December 2003	16 March 2018
U006	18 July 2005	
U007		
U008		
U009		

The first set, set U001, was delivered on 30 August 2003 (approximately seven months ahead of the opening of the Kyushu Shinkansen between Shin-Yatsushiro and Kagoshima-Chūō), with the last set, set U006, being delivered on 18 July 2005. Set U005 was withdrawn on 16 March 2018 following damage sustained from the 2016 Kumamoto earthquakes' 14 April foreshock.

== Interior ==
As the Kyushu Shinkansen runs a large portion in tunnels, designers paid special attention to the interior design of the 800 series to create a more pleasant travel experience. More traditional materials and design features are used to embody Kyushu's warm and natural environment.

Persimmon tannin colour is used for the walls, ancient lacquer for the doors, and Kyushu traditional rope curtain from Yatsushiroigusa for the lavatory are used. The seats are made of wood versus metal/plastic combinations from previous trains and the cushions are produced using Nishijin textiles. Window curtains are produced from prunus serrulata, and interior flooring is also made of wood.

Seating is four abreast (2 by 2), with wheelchair-accessible seating and lavatory facilities in two of the six cars.

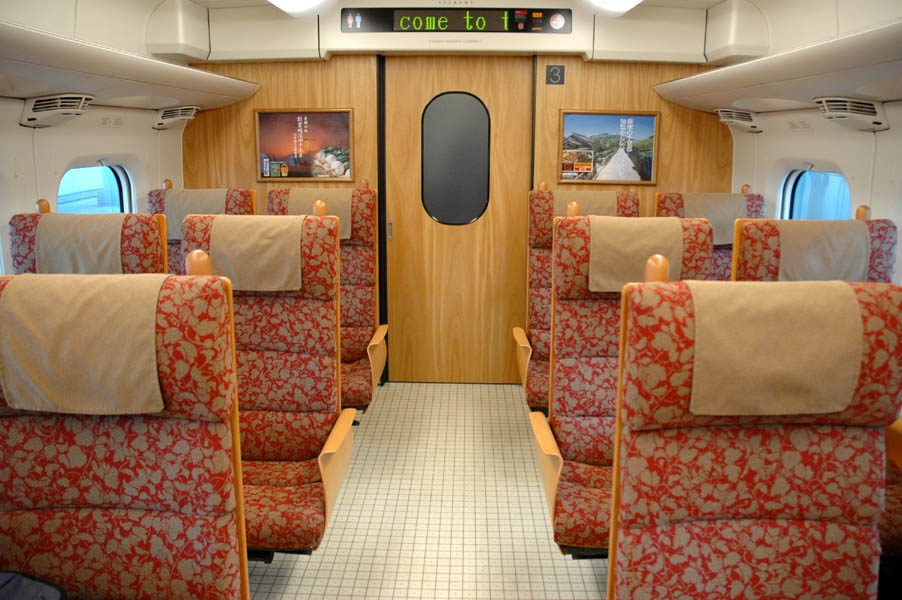
800 series interior

== New 800 series ==
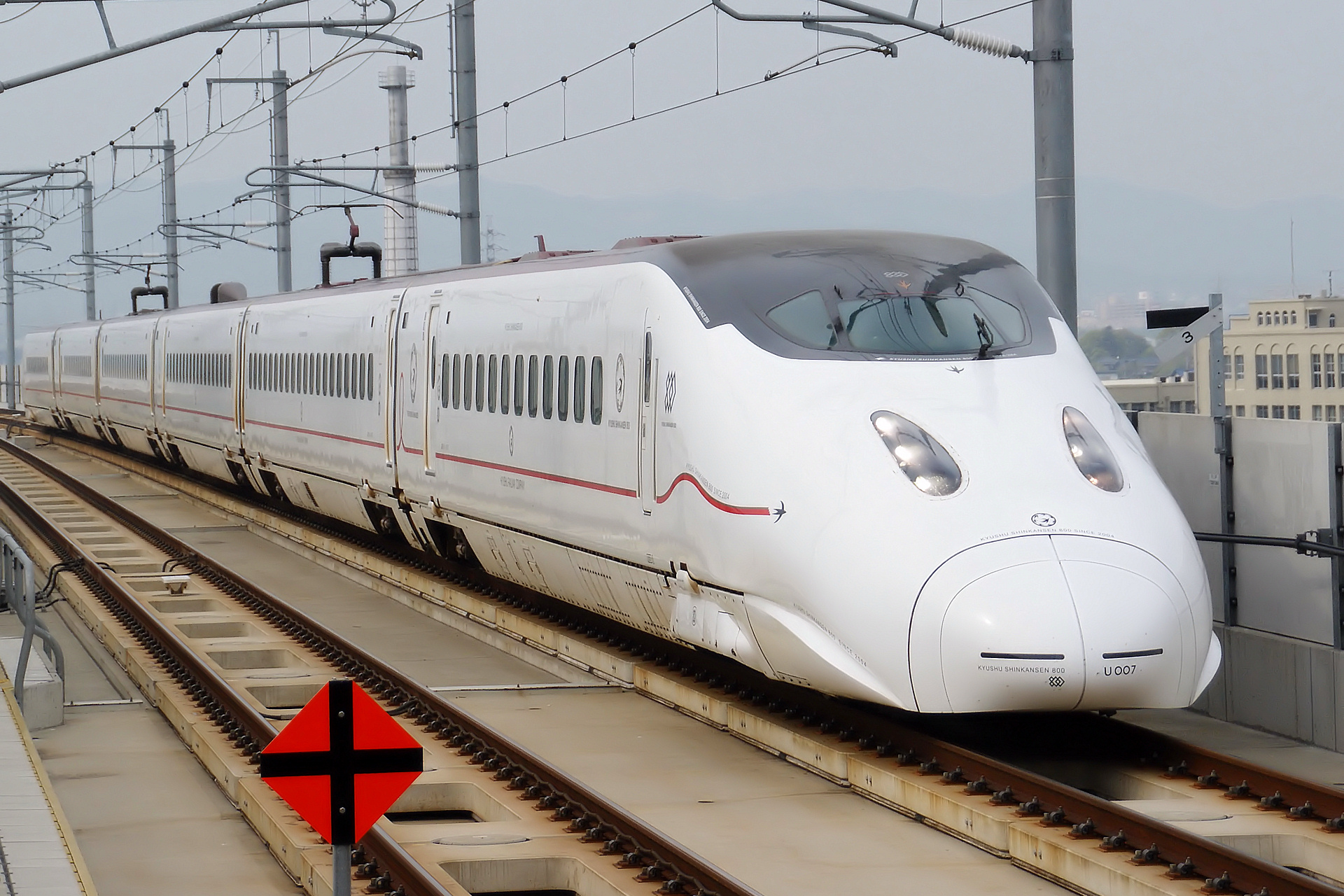
New 800 series set U007 in April 2011

JR Kyushu announced in December 2008 that three new 800 series sets would be delivered between summer 2009 and autumn 2010, ahead of the completion of the entire Kyushu Shinkansen route between Hakata and Kagoshima-Chūō in 2011. The first of the new batch, set U007, was delivered in June 2009, and entered service on 22 August 2009. Externally, the new sets feature minor livery changes regarding the red stripe, and internally, each car features different colour seat covers. Sets U007 and U009 include track condition monitoring equipment and are numbered in the 800–1000 series, while set U008 features overhead wire and signal monitoring equipment and is numbered in the 800–2000 series.

=== Formation ===
Car No.	1	2	3	4	5	6
Designation	Msc	Mp	M2w	M2	Mpw	Mc
Numbering	821-1000	826-1000	827-1000	827-1100	826-1100	822-1100
Seating capacity	46	80	72	72	58	56

Cars 2 and 5 are equipped with PS207K single-arm pantographs.

=== Build history ===
Set number	Date delivered	Remarks
U007	8 August 2009	-
U008	19 March 2010	Cars numbered 8xx-2xxx
U009	24 November 2010	-

=== Interior ===
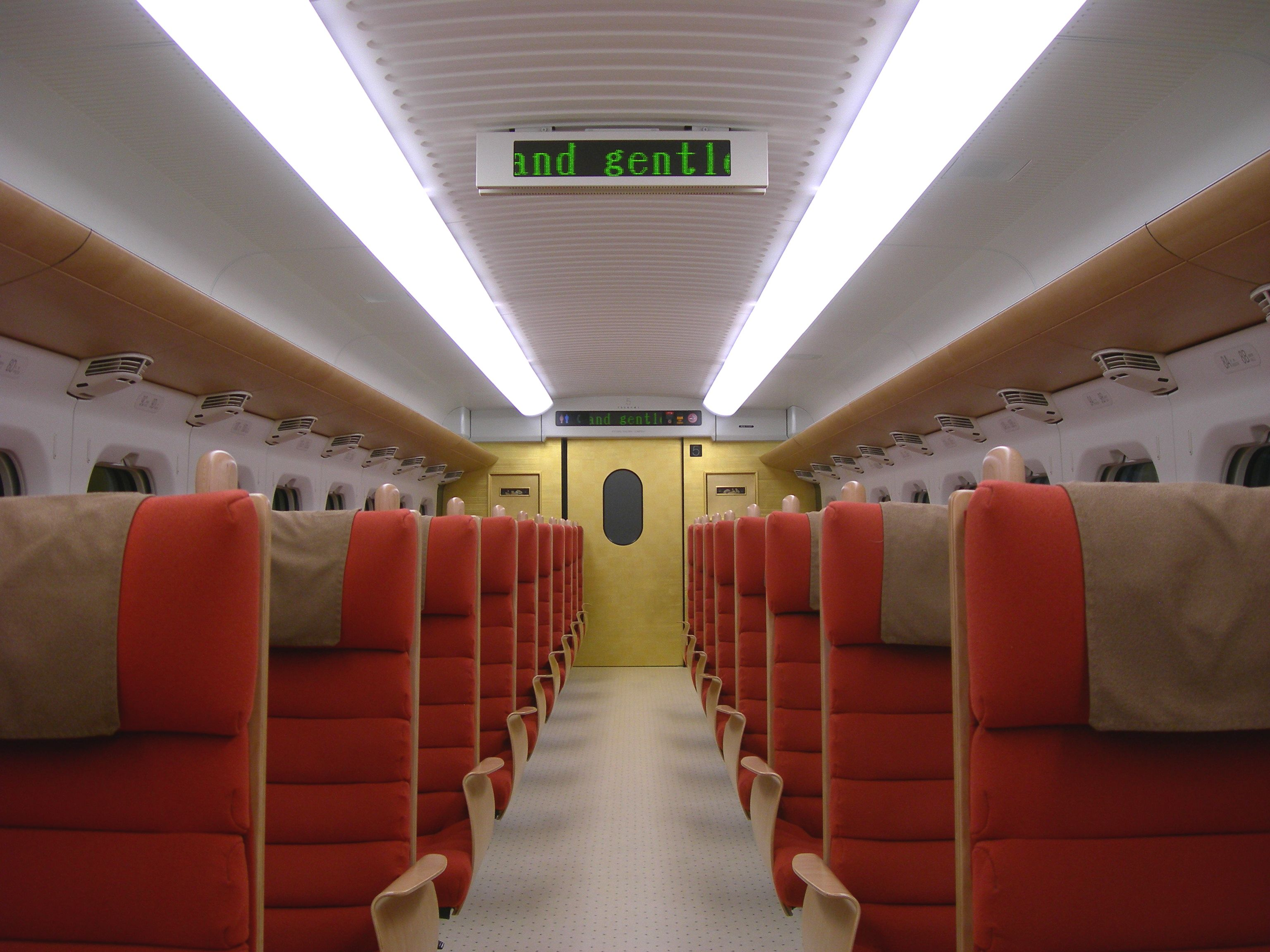
Interior of car 826-1107 (car 5 of set U007)

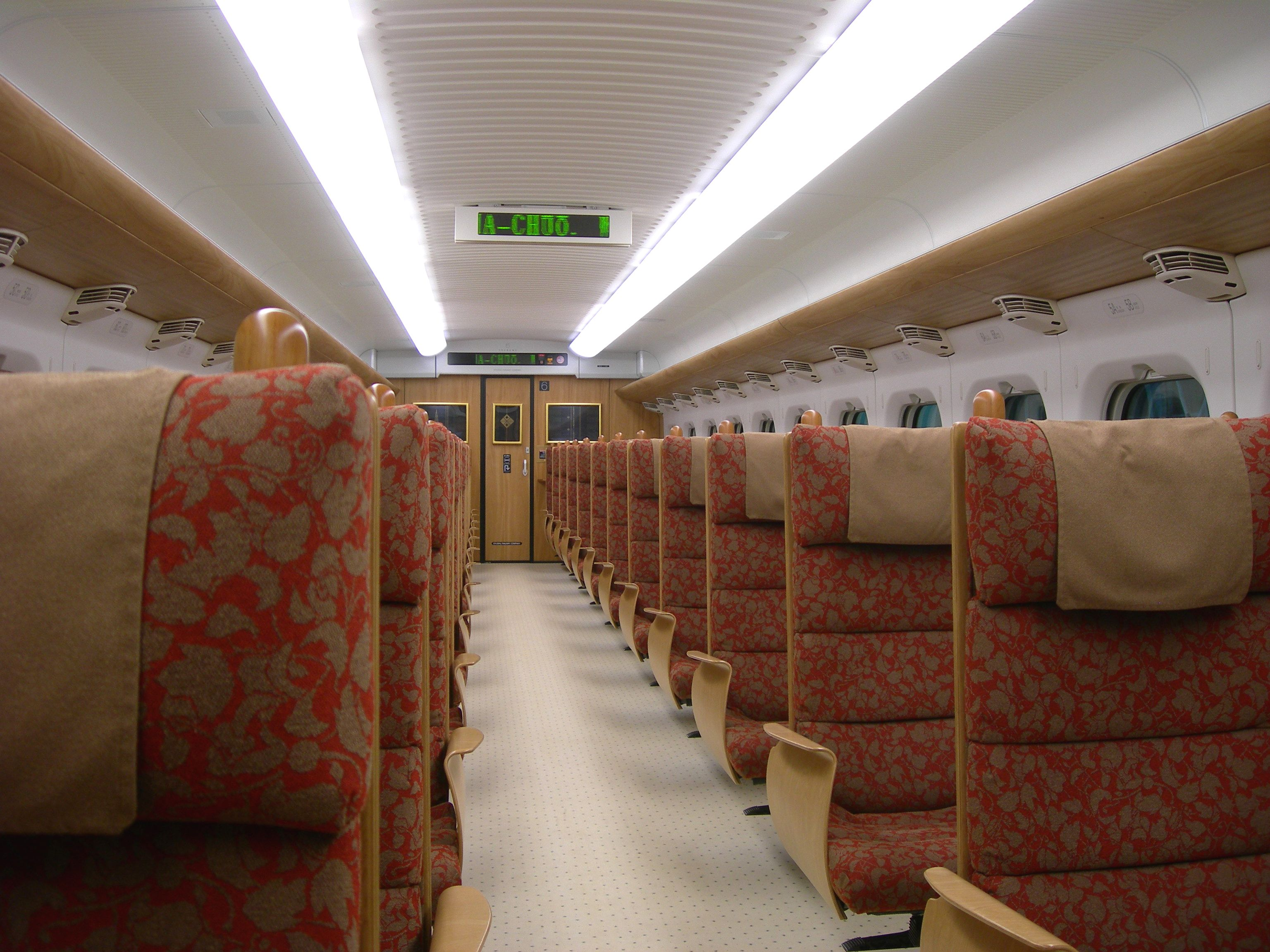
Interior of car 822-1107 (car 6 of set U007)

== Preserved examples ==
The lead car of an 800 Series on display at Hakata Station in April 2026. This car is from set U005, which was damaged beyond repair by the 2016 Kumamoto earthquake.

The lead car from set U005, which was damaged during the 2016 Kumamoto earthquake, was retained for preservation and set aside for repair and conservation work. It was placed on display temporarily outside Hakata Station between 10 April and 19 April 2026 as part of the celebration of the 15th anniversary of the completion of the Kyushu Shinkansen.

== See also ==
- List of high speed trains
