= Sakura (train) =

Japanese high-speed Shinkansen train service

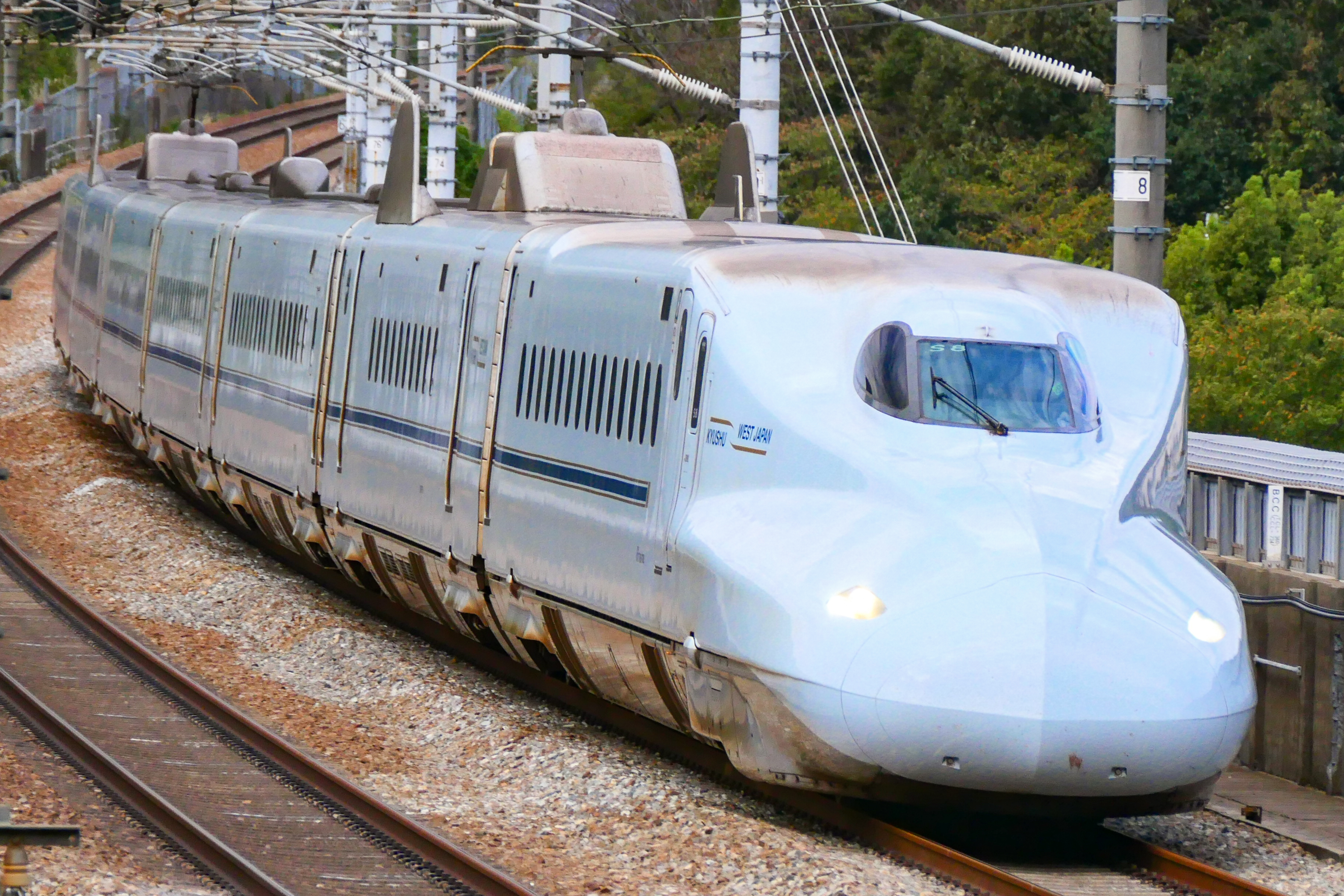
- N700-7000 series set operating a Sakura service, September 2022

Overview
- Service type: Shinkansen (Limited-stop)
- Locale: Japan
- Predecessor: Hikari Rail Star
- First service: 1951 (Limited express); 2011 (Shinkansen)
- Current operators: JR Kyushu, JR West
- Former operator: JNR

Route
- Termini: Shin-Osaka; Kagoshima-Chūō
- Lines used: Kyushu Shinkansen, Sanyo Shinkansen

On-board services
- Classes: Ordinary, Green
- Seating arrangements: Unidirectional

Technical
- Rolling stock: 800 series; N700-7000 series; N700-8000 series
- Track gauge: 1,435 mm (4 ft 8 1/2 in)
- Electrification: 25 kV AC
- Operating speed: 300 km/h (185 mph)

The Sakura (さくら; Cherry Blossom) is a high-speed shinkansen service operated between Shin-Osaka and Kagoshima-Chūō in Japan since 12 March 2011.

It was formerly a limited express sleeper train service operated by JR Kyushu, which ran from Tokyo to Nagasaki and Sasebo in Kyushu, Japan. This former service was discontinued in 2005 due to revised timetables.

== Service pattern ==
Sakura trains stop at Shin-Osaka, Shin-Kobe, Himeji*, Okayama, Fukuyama, Hiroshima, Tokuyama*, Shin-Yamaguchi*, Shin-Shimonoseki*, Kokura, Hakata, Shin-Tosu, Kurume, Chikugo-Funagoya*, Shin-Omuta*, Shin-Tamana*, Kumamoto, Shin-Yatsushiro*, Shin-Minamata*, Izumi*, Sendai, and Kagoshima-Chuo station.

(*) Not served by all trains

== Formations ==
=== N700 series (8 cars) ===
Services are formed as shown below with car 1 at the Kagoshima-Chuo end. All cars are non-smoking since the smoking ban in March 2024. Unusually, reserved ordinary class seats are wider than unreserved seats.

Car No.	1	2	3	4	5	6		7	8
Class	Non-reserved	Non-reserved	Non-reserved	Reserved	Reserved	Reserved	Green	Reserved	Reserved
Facilities	Toilet		Smoking compartment (discontinued), toilet		Toilet			Smoking compartment (discontinued), toilet, wheelchair space	

In 2021, payphones were removed from cars 3 and 8.

In 2024, smoking compartments were discontinued due to the smoking ban.

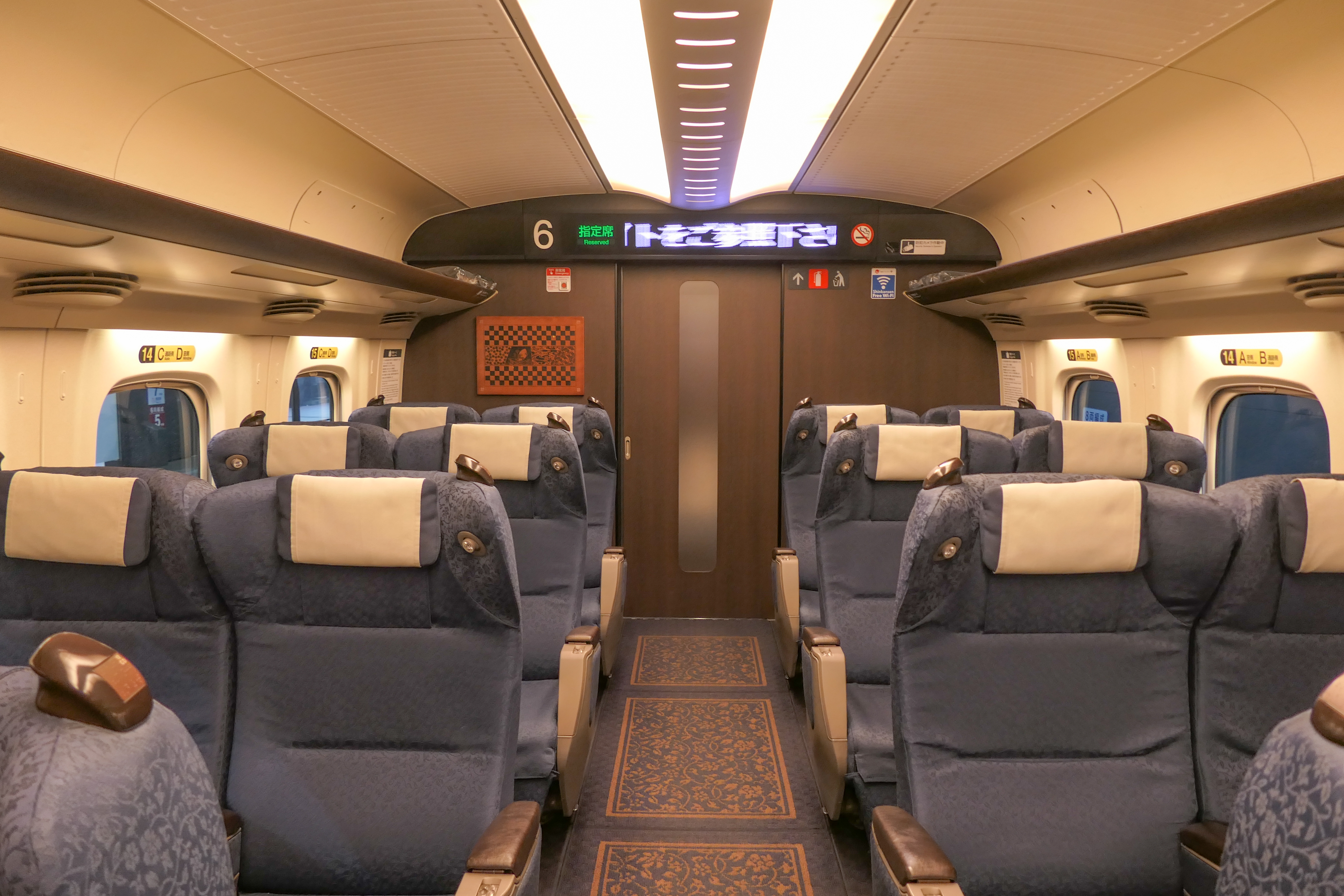
N700-7000 series Green car interior

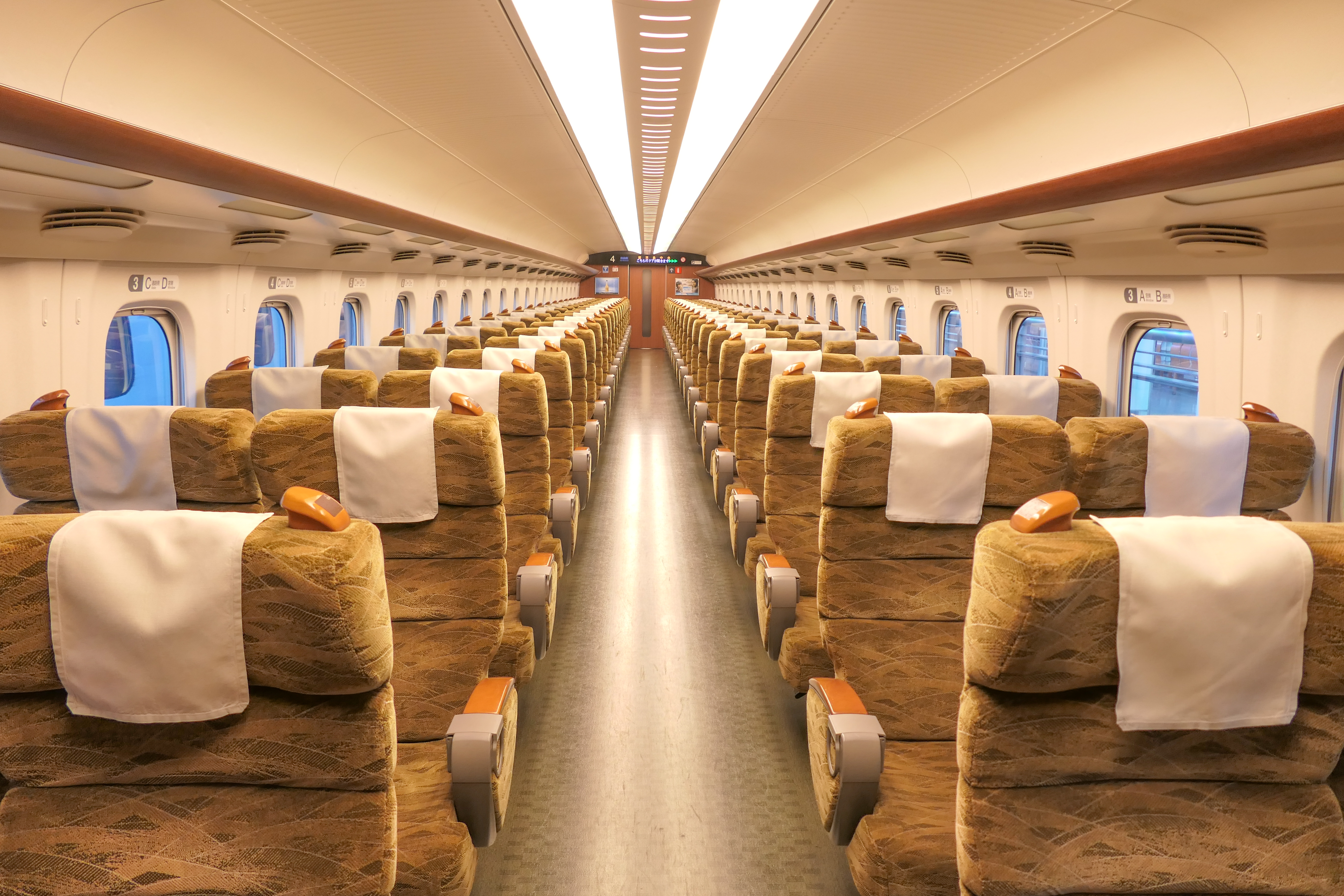
N700-7000 series standard-class reserved car interior

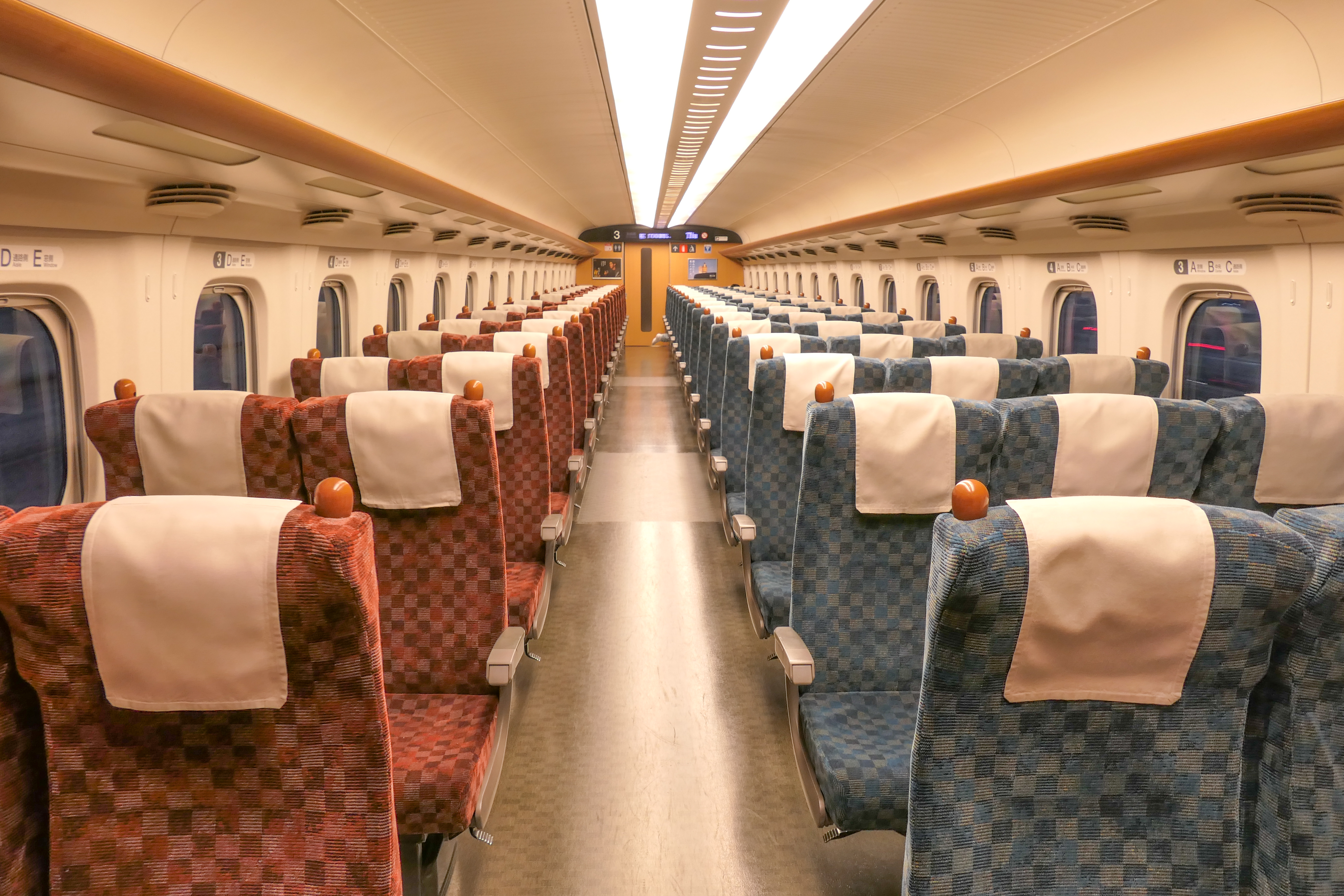
N700-7000 series standard-class non-reserved car interior

=== 800 series (6 cars) ===
All cars are no smoking.

Car No.	1	2	3	4	5	6
Class	Non-reserved	Non-reserved	Non-reserved	Reserved	Reserved	Reserved

== History ==
=== Limited express service ===
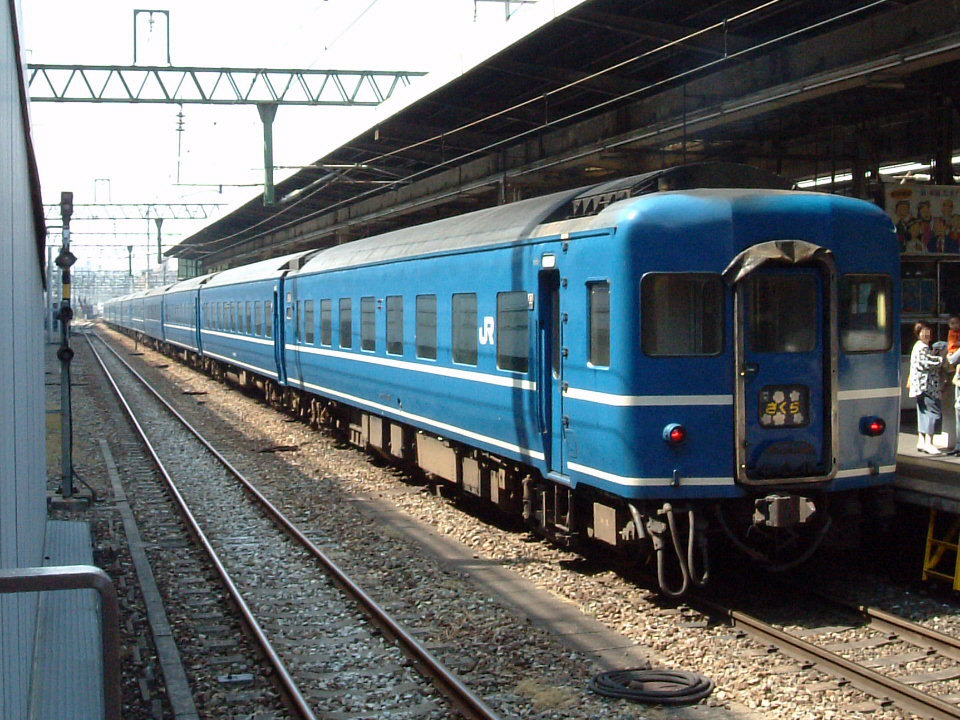
14 series sleeping car at the rear of the Sakura service at Hakata Station, May 2003

The Sakura was first introduced on 1 April 1951 as a daytime Limited express service between Tokyo and Osaka. This service was discontinued in October 1958.

The Sakura sleeping car service commenced on 20 July 1959 using 20 series sleeping cars. From March 1972, the train was upgraded with 14 series sleeping cars.

From 4 December 1999, the Sakura ran coupled with the Hayabusa service between Tokyo and Tosu. The last services ran on the evening of 28 February 2005.

=== Shinkansen service ===
From 12 March 2011, the Sakura name was revived once again for the new shinkansen services operating between Shin-Osaka and Kagoshima-Chūō using new JR West N700-7000 series and JR Kyushu N700-8000 series 8-car trainsets.

Sakura trains operate once every hour between Shin-Osaka and Kagoshima-Chūō throughout the day. One morning service departs from Kumamoto to Shin-Osaka. There are also additional Sakura services between Hakata and Kagoshima-Chuo during the daytime. Some Sakura runs within the Kyushu Shinkansen are operated by 6-car 800 series trains.

As with the existing Hikari service that operates on the Tokaido & Sanyo Shinkansen lines, the Sakura is the fastest service on the Sanyo & Kyushu Shinkansen lines that can be used with the Japan Rail Pass.

In an announcement by JR Central, JR West, and JR Kyushu made on 17 October 2023, the companies stated that all onboard smoking rooms on the Tokaido, San'yo, and Kyushu Shinkansen trains would be discontinued by Q2 2024, which took effect on 16 March 2024.

== Rolling stock ==
In the 1990s, the train was formed of up to fourteen 14 series sleeping cars, including two cafeteria cars. The train was hauled by a JR West Class EF66 electric locomotive between Tokyo and Shimonoseki, a JR Kyushu Class EF81 electric locomotive between Shimonoseki and Moji (through the undersea Kanmon Tunnel), and by JR Kyushu Class ED76 electric locomotives from Moji to Nagasaki and Sasebo.

== See also ==
- List of named passenger trains of Japan
- Blue Train (Japan)
- Mizuho - the limited-stop service operating on the same route
