= Kyushu Shinkansen =

High-speed railway line in Japan

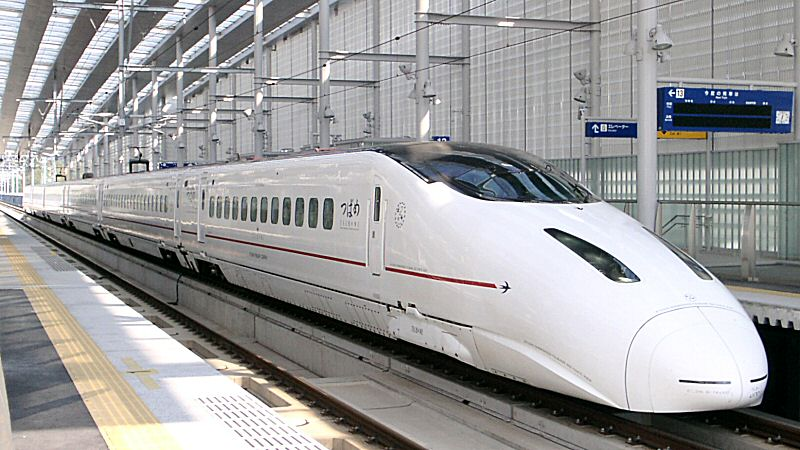
- 800 Series Shinkansen at Shin-Minamata Station

Overview
- Native name: 九州新幹線
- Owner: JRTT
- Locale: Kyushu (Fukuoka, Saga, Kumamoto, and Kagoshima prefectures)
- Termini: Hakata; Kagoshima-Chūō
- Stations: 12
- Color on map: Red

Service
- Type: High-speed rail
- System: Shinkansen
- Services: Mizuho · Sakura · Tsubame
- Operator: JR Kyushu
- Depot: Kumamoto · Sendai
- Rolling stock: 800 series · N700 series

History
- Opened: 13 March 2004; 22 years ago

Technical
- Line length: 256.8 km (159.6 mi)
- Track gauge: 1,435 mm (4 ft 8 1/2 in) standard gauge
- Minimum radius: 4,000 m (2.5 mi; 13,000 ft)
- Electrification: Overhead line, 25 kV 60 Hz AC
- Operating speed: 260 km/h (162 mph)
Route map

The Kyushu Shinkansen (Japanese: 九州新幹線, Hepburn: Kyūshū Shinkansen) is a Japanese high-speed rail line and part of the nationwide Shinkansen network. It is an extension of the San'yō Shinkansen from Honshu, connecting Hakata Station in the city of Fukuoka on Japan's island of Kyūshū to Kagoshima-Chuo Station in the city of Kagoshima in the south. The line runs parallel to the existing Kagoshima Main Line and is operated by the Kyushu Railway Company (JR Kyushu).

The southernmost 127 km (79 mi) section was constructed first, opening on 13 March 2004. The double-track section offered a significant improvement in travel time over the equivalent single-track portion of the Kagoshima Main Line, despite the need for passengers to change to a Relay Tsubame narrow gauge train at Shin-Yatsushiro for the remainder of the journey to Hakata Station. The northernmost 130 km (81 mi) section opened on 12 March 2011, enabling through services to Shin-Ōsaka Station (and, with an interchange, to Tōkyō Station).

== Route ==
Construction of the Kagoshima route (鹿児島ルート) began in 1991, and the first segment between Kagoshima and Shin-Yatsushiro opened on 13 March 2004. This initial section cut travel times between the two cities from 2 hours and 10 minutes to 35 minutes and reduced the time between Hakata and Kagoshima from 4 hours to 2 hours. When the entire line was completed, the travel time from Hakata to Kagoshima was further reduced to about an hour and 20 minutes. As of 2012, the maximum line speed is 260 km/h (160 mph) between Hakata and Kagoshima. Like all Shinkansen lines, the Kyushu Shinkansen is standard gauge.

The line's Sakura and Mizuho services often operate through to Shin-Ōsaka Station via the San'yō Shinkansen. All-stop trains are named Tsubame ("Swallow"), the name of the former Hakata-Kagoshima limited express service, and are solely truncated to the Kyushu Shinkansen.

In September 2011, six months after the line's completion, JR Kyushu reported a year-over-year increase in ridership of 64% to the southern part of Kyushu (between Kumamoto and Kagoshima), easily surpassing the 40% increase projected by the company. By the first anniversary, ridership had increased, mainly from tourists from Kansai and Chugoku. In northern Kyushu, where there is fierce competition with conventional JR rapid service, the private Nishi-Nippon Railroad, and expressway buses, Shinkansen ridership increased by only 38% (compared to the now-discontinued conventional express Relay Tsubame), falling short of estimates.

== Stations ==
- Tsubame trains stop at all stations; other services have varying stopping patterns. All trains stop at Hakata, Kumamoto and Kagoshima-Chūō.

Legend:

●	All trains stop
▲	Some trains stop
｜	All trains pass

Station	Distance from		Service			Transfers	Location	
Station	Hakata km (mi)	Shin-Ōsaka km (mi)	Mizuho	Sakura	Tsubame	Transfers	Location	
↑ Through services towards Shin-Ōsaka via the Sanyō Shinkansen (Note: Only Mizuho and Sakura services run through to the Sanyō Shinkansen.) ↑
Hakata	0 (0)	553.7 (344.1)	●	●	●	San'yō Shinkansen (through service); Hakataminami Line; Relay Kamome (Nishi Kyushu Shinkansen connection); JA JB Kagoshima Main Line (JA00/JB00); JC Fukuhoku Yutaka Line (JC00); Airport Line (K11); Nanakuma Line (N18)	Hakata, Fukuoka City	Fukuoka; Prefecture
Shin-Tosu	26.3 (16.3)	580.0 (360.4)	｜	●	●	JH Nagasaki Line (JH02); Relay Kamome	Tosu	Saga; Prefecture
Kurume	32.0 (19.9)	585.7 (363.9)	▲	●	●	JB Kagoshima Main Line (JB17); Kyūdai Main Line	Kurume	Fukuoka; Prefecture
Chikugo-Funagoya	47.9 (29.8)	601.6 (373.8)	｜	▲	●	JB Kagoshima Main Line (JB21)	Chikugo	Fukuoka; Prefecture
Shin-Ōmuta	59.7 (37.1)	613.4 (381.1)	｜	▲	●		Ōmuta	Fukuoka; Prefecture
Shin-Tamana	76.3 (47.4)	630.0 (391.5)	｜	▲	●		Tamana	Kumamoto; Prefecture
Kumamoto	98.2 (61.0)	651.9 (405.1)	●	●	●	Hōhi Main Line; Kagoshima Main Line; Kumamoto City Tram	Nishi-ku, Kumamoto	Kumamoto; Prefecture
Shin-Yatsushiro	130.0 (80.8)	683.7 (424.8)	｜	▲	●	Kagoshima Main Line	Yatsushiro	Kumamoto; Prefecture
Shin-Minamata	172.8 (107.4)	726.5 (451.4)	｜	▲	●	Hisatsu Orange Railway Line	Minamata	Kumamoto; Prefecture
Izumi	188.8 (117.3)	742.5 (461.4)	｜	▲	●	Hisatsu Orange Railway Line	Izumi	Kagoshima; Prefecture
Sendai	221.5 (137.6)	775.2 (481.7)	▲	●	●	Hisatsu Orange Railway Line; Kagoshima Main Line	Satsumasendai	Kagoshima; Prefecture
Kagoshima-Chūō	256.8 (159.6)	810.5 (503.6)	●	●	●	Ibusuki Makurazaki Line; Kagoshima Main Line; Kagoshima City Tram	Kagoshima	Kagoshima; Prefecture

== Services ==
Services not leaving the Kyushu Shinkansen are operated by 6-car 800 Series trains, with a maximum speed of 260 km/h (160 mph). The trains were developed by Hitachi, and based on the 700 series trains already in service on the Tokaido/Sanyo Shinkansen line.

Eight-car N700 series trains are used on through-running services between Shin-Osaka and Kagoshima-Chūō. The first set (S1) was delivered to Hakata Depot in October 2008.

Three services operate on the line, in order of speed: Mizuho, Sakura, and Tsubame. The Mizuho makes two return trips between Shin-Osaka and Kagoshima-Chūō during the morning hours, and two return trips during the evening, with an end-to-end journey time of 3 hours 45 minutes. Sakura services run once per hour throughout the day between Shin-Osaka and Kagoshima-Chūō making additional stops, with an end-to-end travel time of 4 hours 10 minutes. There are also one to two Sakura services every hour between Hakata and either Kumamoto or Kagoshima-Chūō. Tsubame trains operate the all-stations shuttle service between Hakata and Kumamoto once to twice per hour, with some services operating to/from Kagoshima-Chūō. Mizuho trains can be used by foreign passengers traveling with a Japan Rail Pass only upon payment of a supplement.

== Incidents ==
=== 2016 Kumamoto earthquakes ===
On the evening of 14 April 2016, the entire length of the Kagoshima Route was shut down after the first of two powerful earthquakes struck Kumamoto prefecture. There was extensive damage along the route, including cracks in elevated support structures at 25 locations and collapsed sound insulation walls in nearly 80 locations.

An 800 series train was derailed near Kumamoto Station after the first tremor, while the train was deadheading. On 18 April, JR Kyushu began attempts to return the derailed train to the tracks.

On 27 April 2016, the line reopened with reduced speed and service frequency.

=== 2021 attempted arson ===
On the morning of 8 November 2021, a 69-year old man from Fukuoka attempted to set a Sakura Shinkansen service on fire. The train, Sakura #401, was travelling between Kumamoto and Shin-Yatsuhiro stations at the time of the attempted arson. No casualties were reported. According to the perpetrator, the motive of the incident was to replicate the October 2021 Tokyo attack.

=== 2026 Kumamoto earthquake ===
On the afternoon of 28 July 2026, the entirety of the Kyushu Shinkansen was closed after a magnitude 6.8 earthquake struck Kumamoto Prefecture in the areas of Hikawa and Uki, through which the shinkansen route runs. In an update on 31 July, JR Kyushu announced that damage was reported at over 200 locations on the section between Kumamoto and Kagoshima-Chuo, including railway track and noise barriers, and that reopening the line south of Kumamoto during the month of August would be difficult.

Limited service resumed between Hakata and Chikugo-Funagoya on the evening of 29 July. The section between Chikugo-Funagoya and Kumamoto reopened on 31 July, with a full timetable of services as far south as Kumamoto restored soon thereafter. The section between Shin-Minamata and Kagoshima-Chuo reopened on 7 August 2026 with limited service. The section between Kumamoto and Shin-Minamata reopened on 18 September, with around 90 percent of service restored and trains operating at reduced speeds in the vicinity of Shin-Yatsushiro station.
