= Tsubame (train) =

Japanese high-speed Shinkansen train service

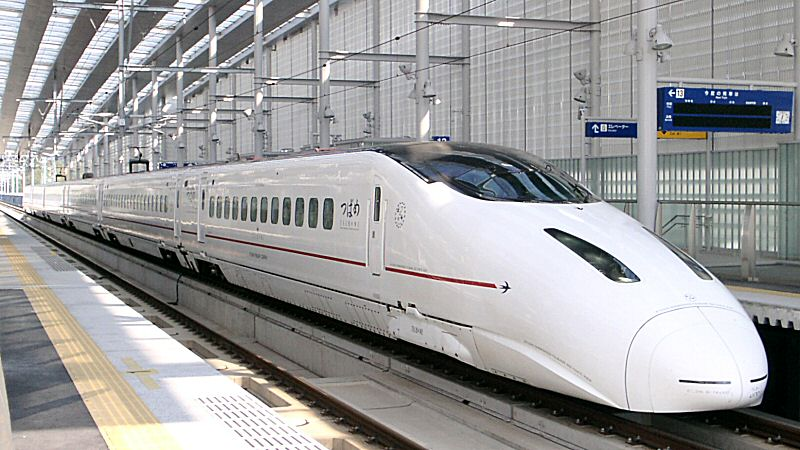
- 800 Series Shinkansen Tsubame at Shin-Minamata Station in November 2004

Overview
- Service type: Shinkansen (Local)
- Status: Operational
- Locale: Kyushu Shinkansen
- First service: 1 October 1930 (Limited express); 13 March 2004 (Shinkansen)
- Current operator: JR Kyushu
- Former operator: JNR

Route
- Termini: Hakata; Kumamoto or Kagoshima-Chūō

On-board services
- Class: Ordinary class + Green class
- Catering facilities: Trolley refreshment service

Technical
- Rolling stock: 800 series/N700-7000 series/N700-8000 series
- Track gauge: 1,435 mm (4 ft 8 1/2 in)
- Electrification: 25 kV AC, 60 Hz
- Operating speed: 260 km/h (160 mph)

The Tsubame (つばめ) is a train service operated by Kyushu Railway Company (JR Kyushu) on the Kyushu Shinkansen in Japan since 2004.

The word tsubame (燕) in Japanese means "swallow", and has been used on a succession of limited express trains on the Tokaido and Sanyo Main Line in Japan since 1930.

== History ==
=== Pre-war ===
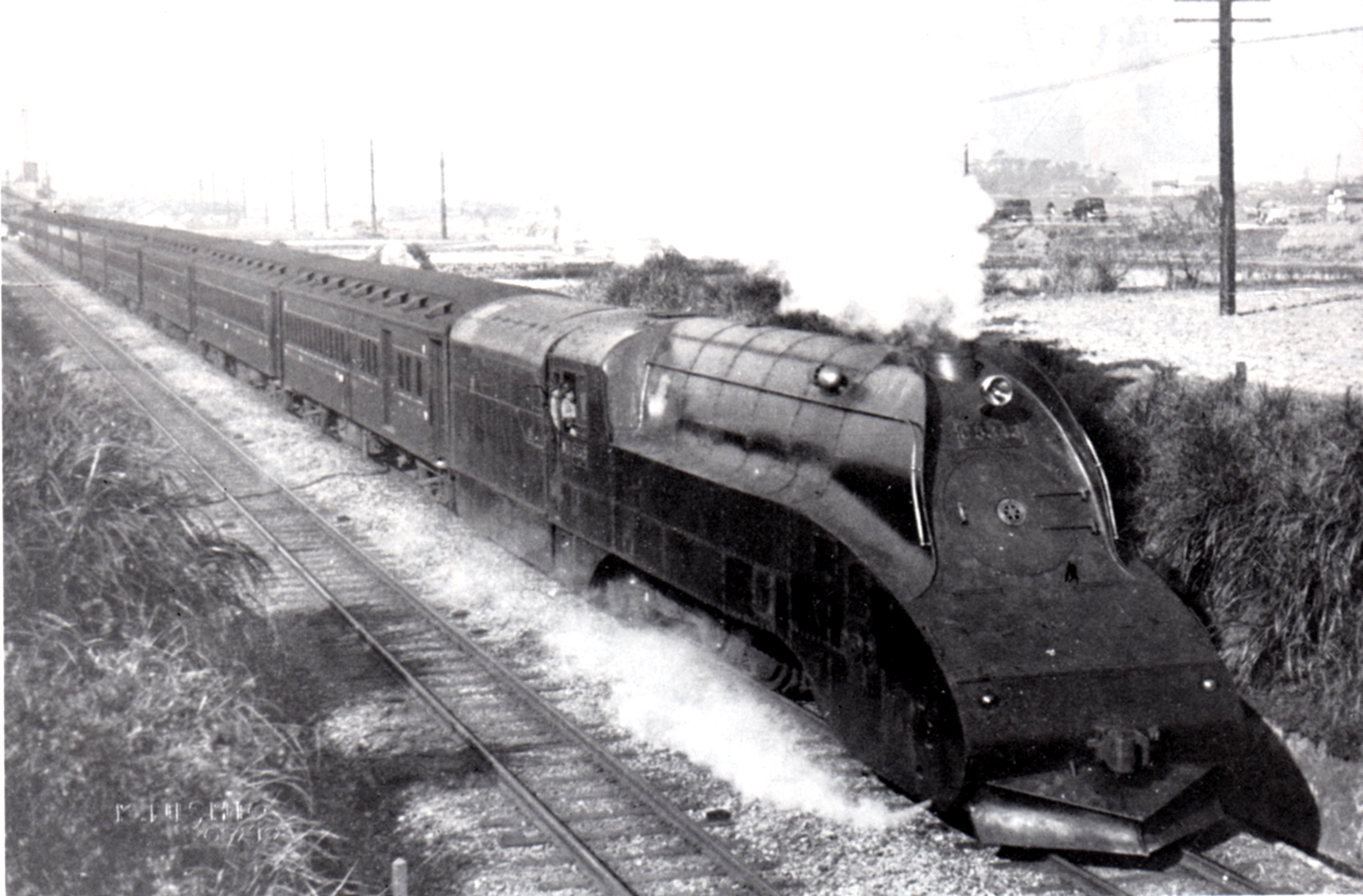
A C53 locomotive hauling the Tsubame service near Nishiakashi, circa 1934.

The Tsubame name (originally written as "燕") was first used from 1 October 1930 for limited express services operating between Tokyo and Kobe, hauled by JNR Class C51 and JNR Class C53 steam locomotives. These services operated until 30 September 1943.

=== Post-war ===
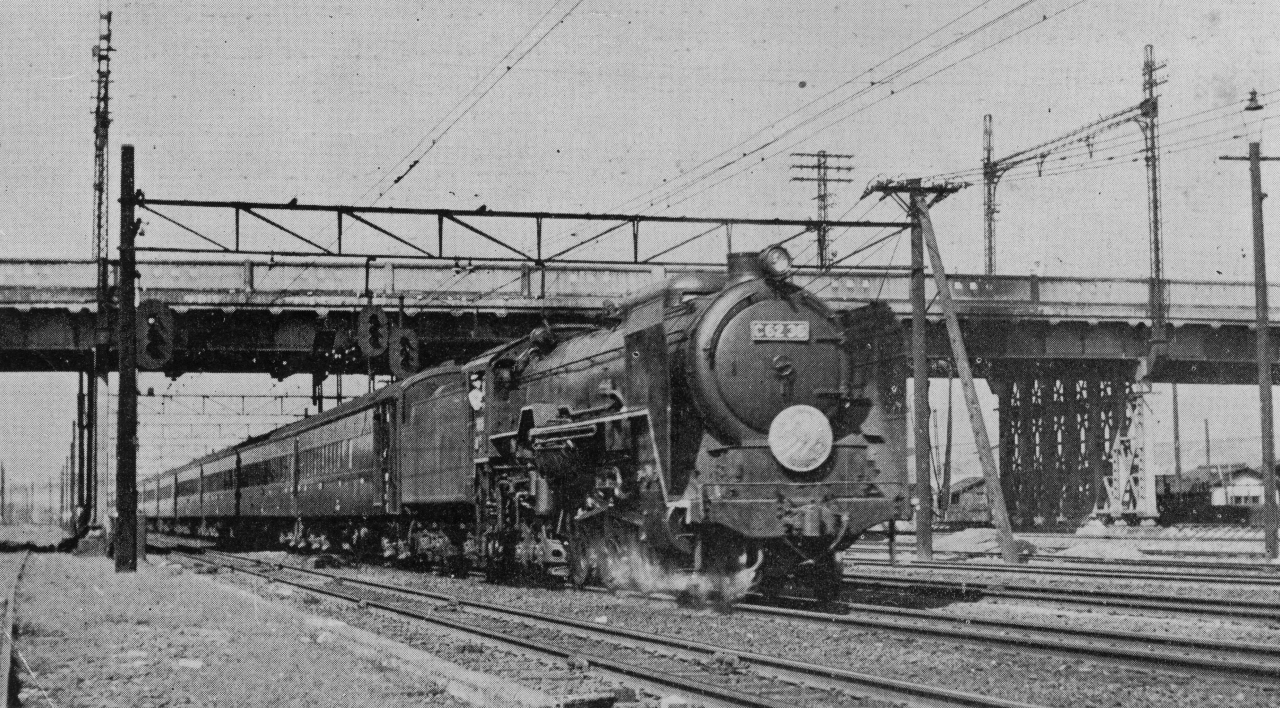
A JNR Class C62 hauling the Tsubame service near Kyoto

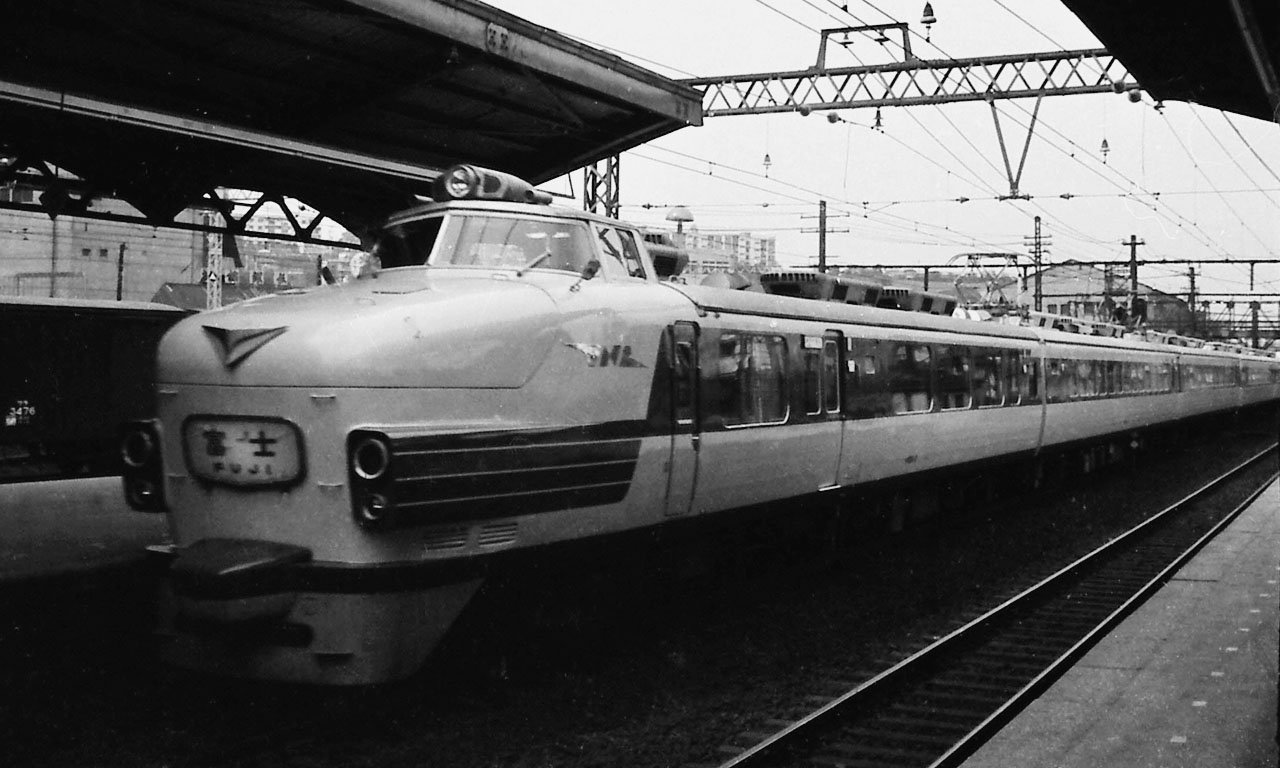
Series 151 EMUs, which were used for the Tsubame service after 1958

The name was revived (this time written as "つばめ") from 1 January 1950 for limited express services operating between Tokyo and Osaka, hauled by JNR Class C62 steam and JNR Class EF58 electric locomotives, and later by 151 series electric multiple unit (EMU) trains. From 1 October 1964, following the opening of the Tōkaidō Shinkansen, the name was reassigned to limited express trains operating between Shin-Osaka and Hakata. From 1 October 1965, services were extended to operate between Nagoya and Hakata, operated by 481 and 583 series EMUs. These services continued until 9 March 1975 (when the San'yō Shinkansen was fully in operation).

=== JR Kyushu ===
The Tsubame name was once again revived by JR Kyushu from 15 July 1992 for limited express services operating on the Kagoshima Main Line between Mojiko/Hakata and Nishi-Kagoshima (now Kagoshima-Chūō Station), operated using new 787 series EMUs in 6-, 7-, or 11-car formations. These services operated until 12 March 2004, the day before the new Kyushu Shinkansen opened.

=== Relay Tsubame ===
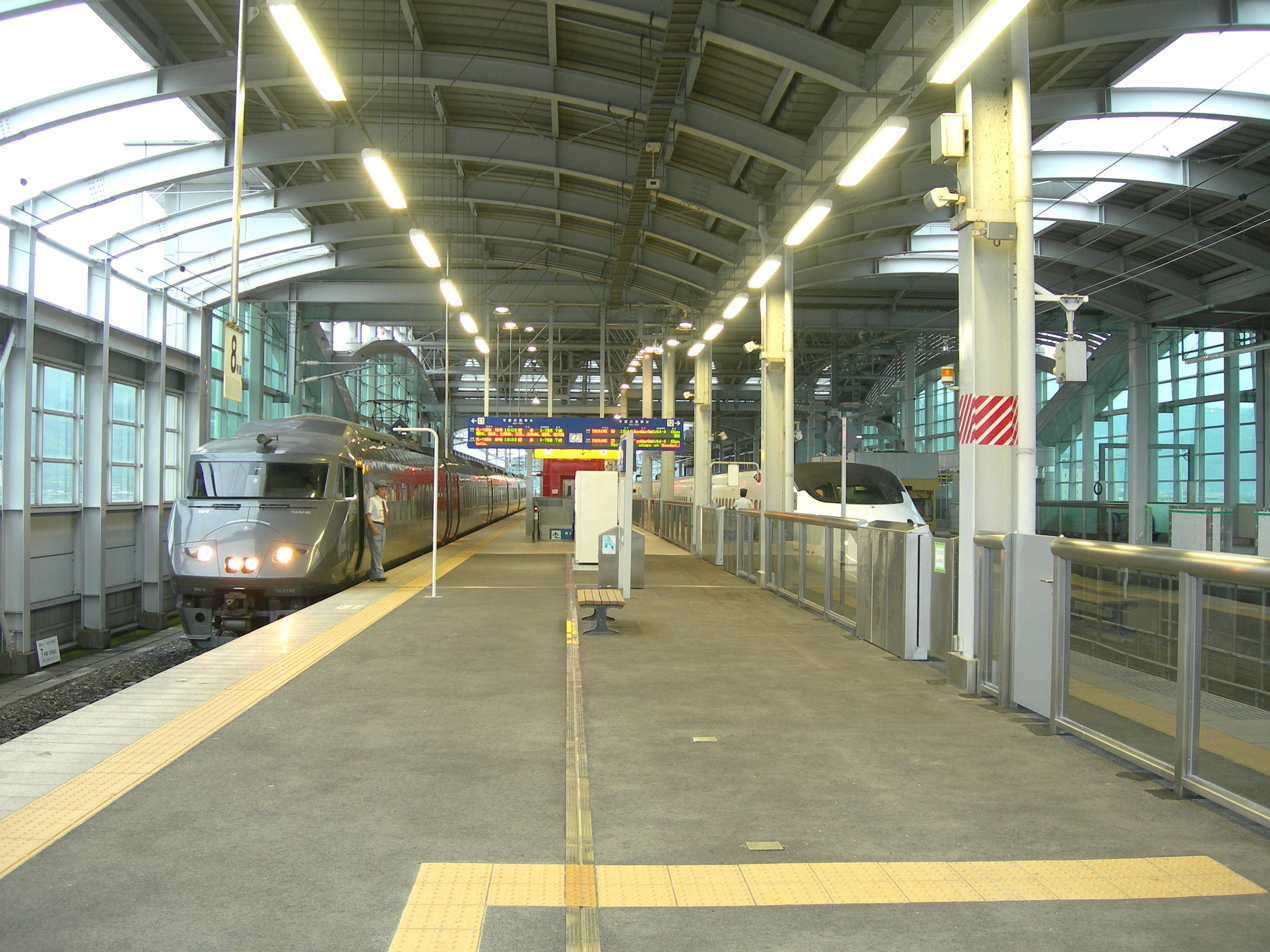
A 787 series Relay Tsubame train (left) and 800 series Tsubame shinkansen train (right) at Shin-Yatsushiro Station in June 2010

With the start of services on the Kyushu Shinkansen between Shin-Yatsushiro and Kagoshima-Chūō from 13 March 2004, new Relay Tsubame services commenced on the Kagoshima Main Line between Hakata and Shin-Yatsushiro using 787 series EMUs in 7-, 8-, and 11-car formations. The operation of the Relay Tsubame service was unique, as it was the only station in Japan where normal trains stopped at platforms adjacent to the shinkansen platforms. This was to facilitate transfer of passengers from shinkansen to Relay Tsubame and vice versa. Normally, shinkansen platforms are physically separated from normal train platforms with fare gates and may be at a different level (usually above the normal train platforms).

When the remainder of the Kyushu Shinkansen was opened on 12 March 2011, the Tsubame became an all-stations service (similar to the Kodama on the Tokaido and Sanyo Shinkansen), operating primarily as shuttle services between Hakata and Kumamoto. Services operate twice per hour in each direction during the morning and evening, and once per hour during the middle of the day. Some Tsubame services also run to/from Kagoshima-Chūō. One morning train, Tsubame 302, operates to Kokura from Kumamoto, while a separate southbound morning service, Tsubame 321, operates from Shin-Shimonoseki to Kumamoto. Both trains operate using the N700 series Shinkansen.

== Rolling stock ==
Shinkansen train services are formed of eight-car N700 series (JR West N700-7000 series and JR Kyushu N700-8000 series) trains or six-car JR Kyushu 800 series trains.

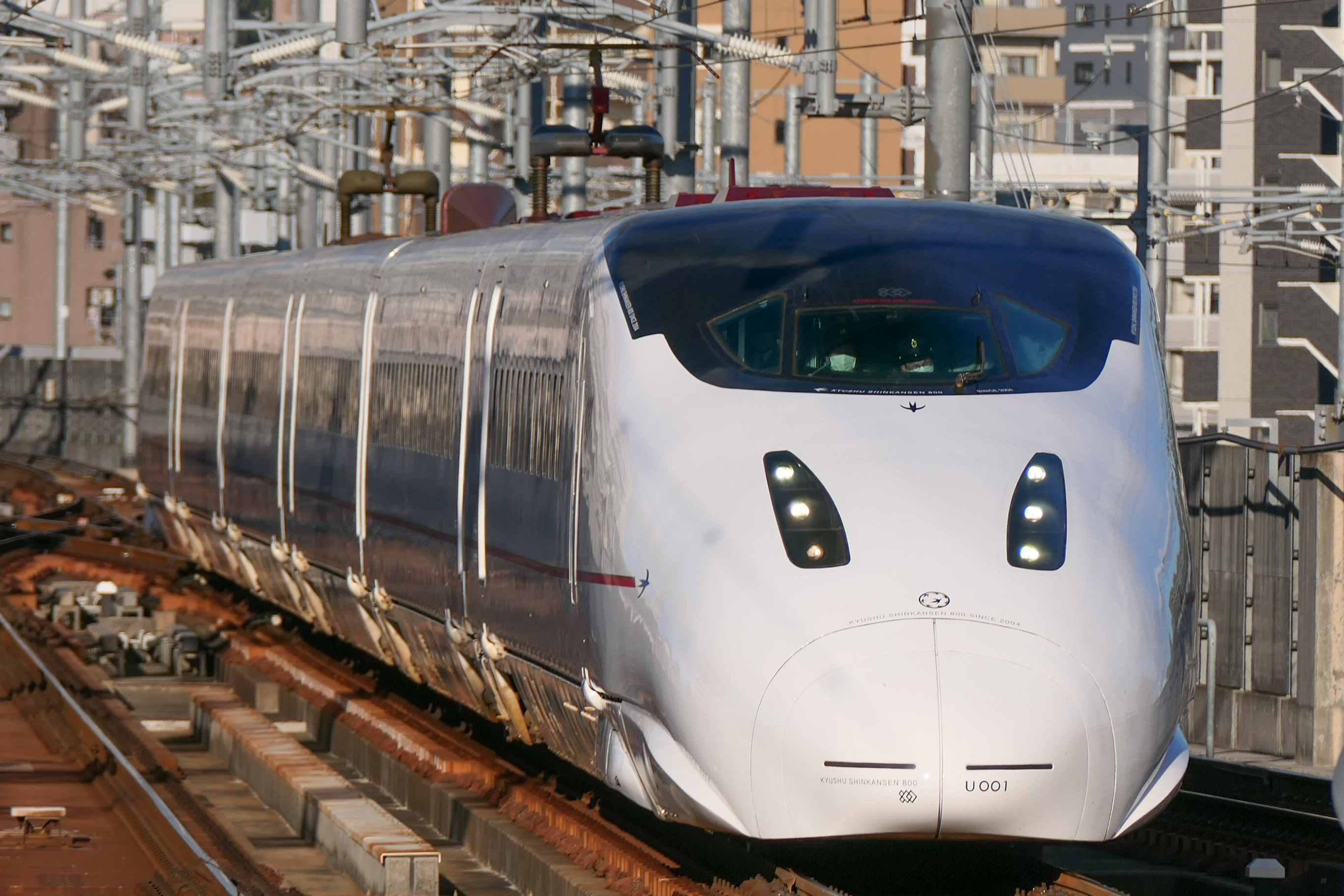
A JR Kyushu 800 series train set in January 2022

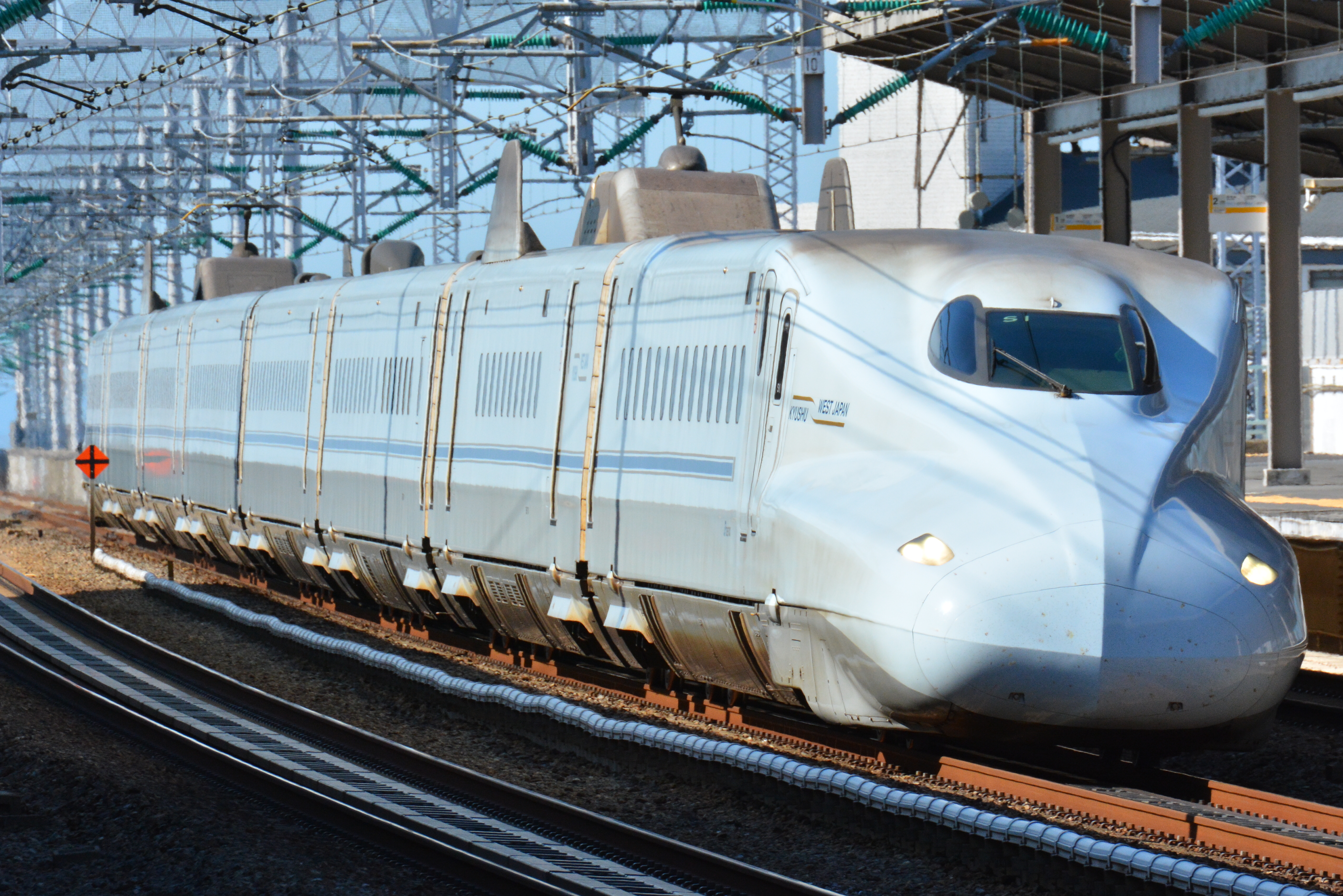
A JR West N700-7000 series trainset

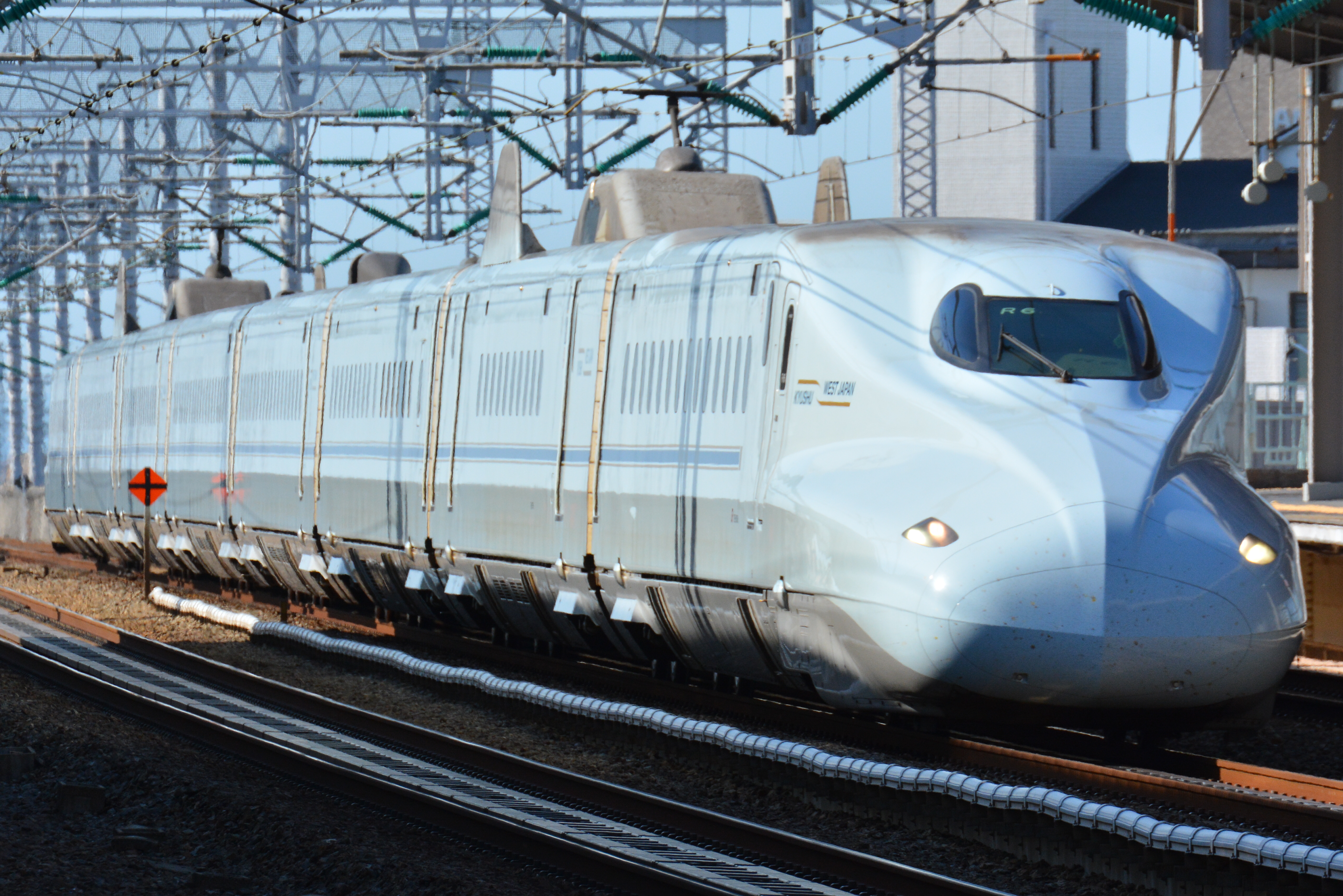
A JR Kyushu N700-8000 series trainset

== Formations ==
=== N700 series ===
Eight-car N700 series services are formed as follows, with car 1 at the Kagoshima-Chūō (southern) end. Cars 1 to 3 are ordinary-class cars with 2+3 seating, and cars 4 to 8 are ordinary-class cars with 2+2 seating. Half of car 6 has "Green car" (first class) 2+2 seating. All cars are non-smoking since the smoking ban in March 2024.

| Car No. | 1 | 2 | 3 | 4 | 5 | 6 | | 7 | 8 |
|---|---|---|---|---|---|---|---|---|---|
| Accommodation | Non-reserved | Non-reserved | Non-reserved | Reserved | Reserved | Reserved | Green | Reserved | Reserved |

On some train services, cars 4 and 5 are also non-reserved.

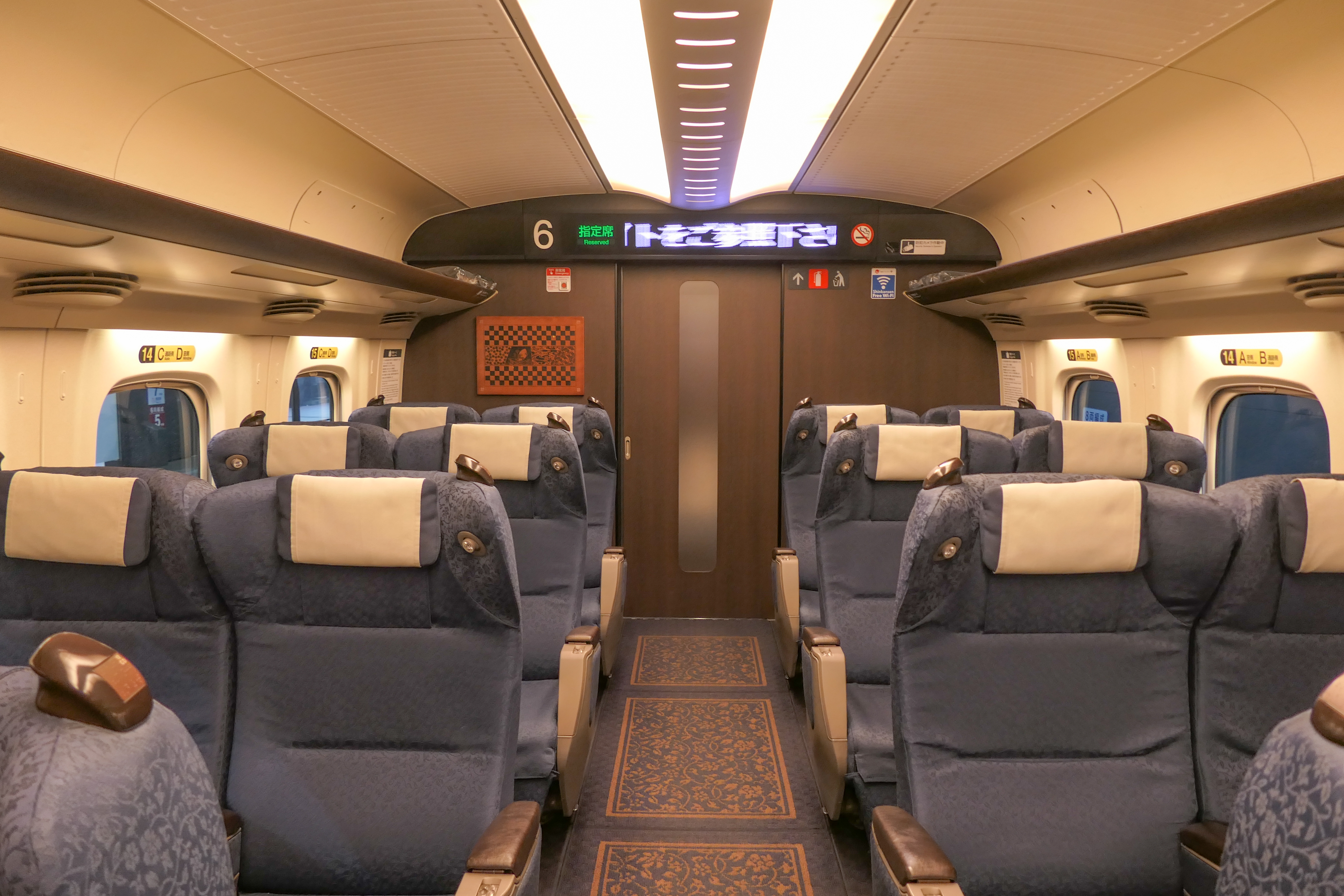
N700-7000 series Green car interior

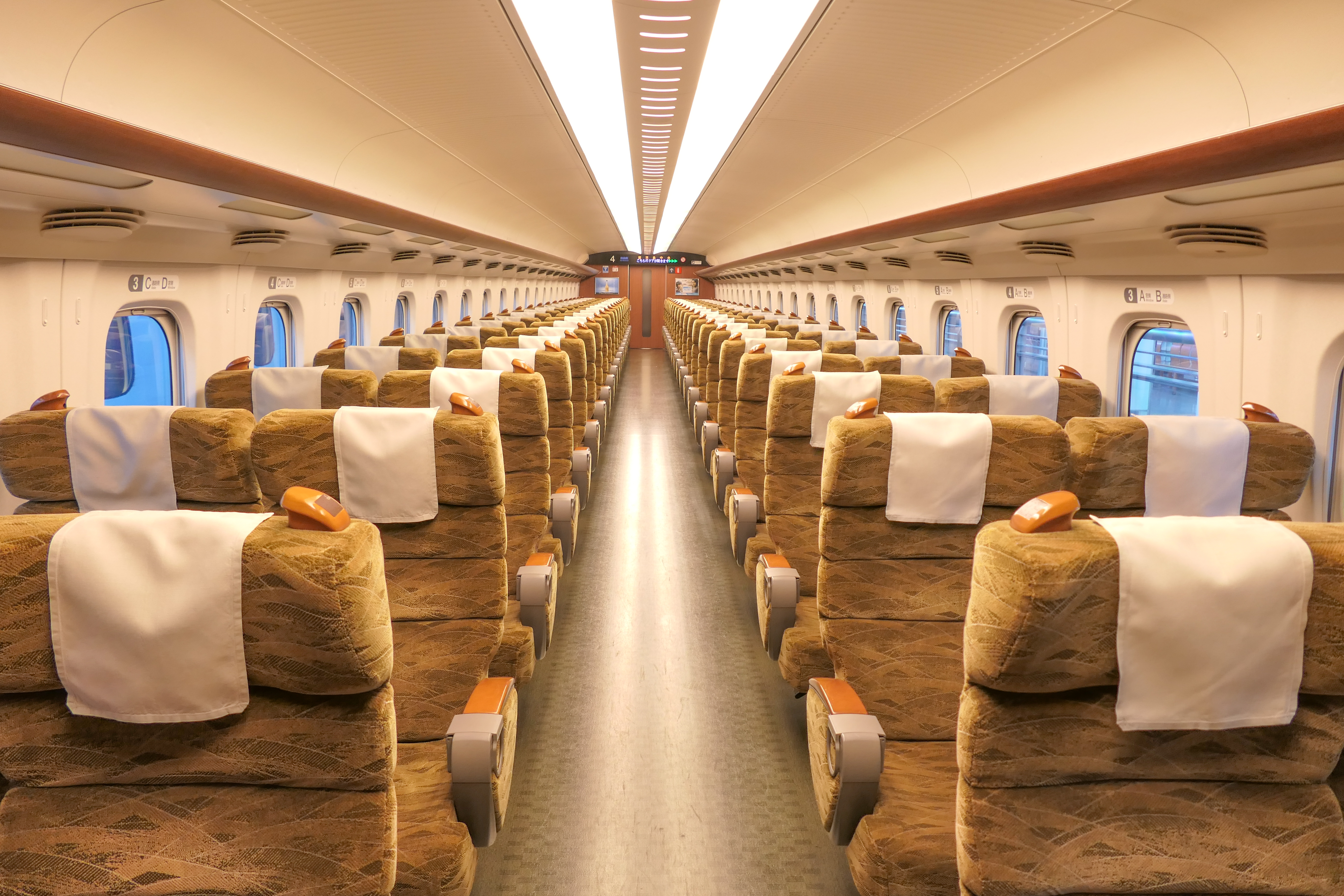
N700-7000 series standard-class reserved car interior

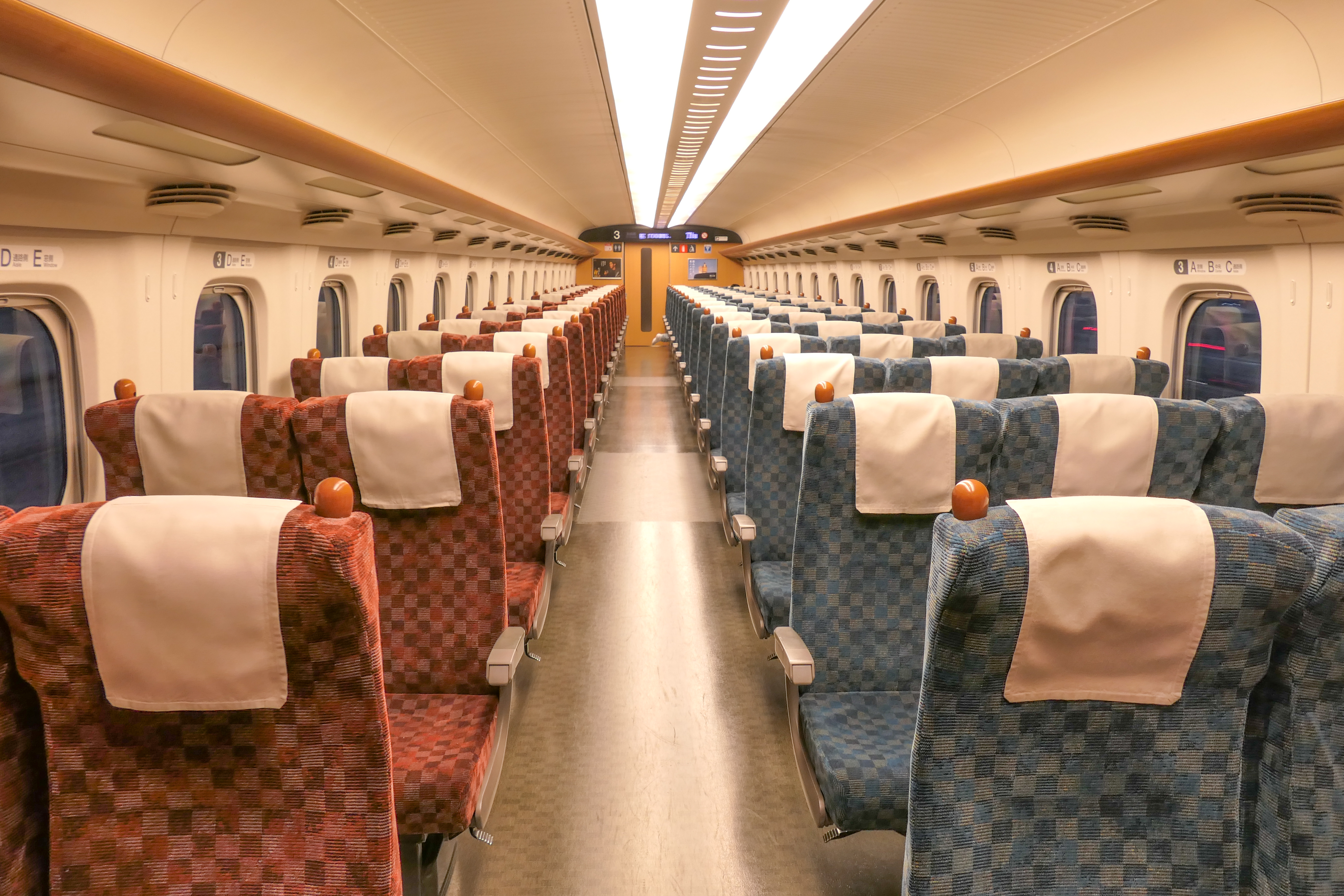
N700-7000 series standard-class non-reserved car interior

=== 800 series ===
Six-car 800 series services are formed as follows, with car 1 at the Kagoshima-Chūō (southern) end. All accommodation is ordinary class with 2+2 seating. All cars are non-smoking.

| Car No. | 1 | 2 | 3 | 4 | 5 | 6 |
|---|---|---|---|---|---|---|
| Accommodation | Non-reserved | Non-reserved | Non-reserved | Reserved | Reserved | Reserved |

On some train services, car 4 is also non-reserved.

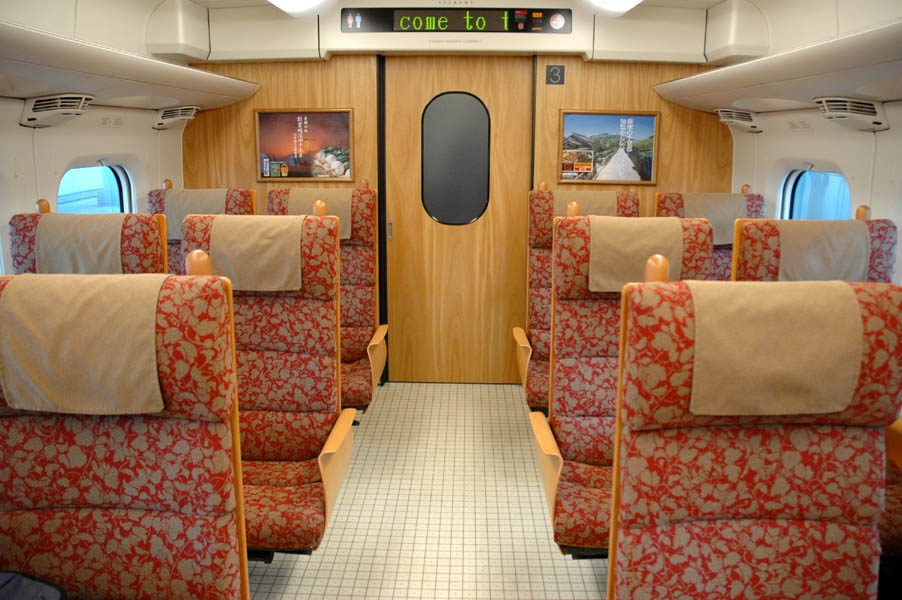
Interior of an 800 series car
