= Mizuho (train) =

Japanese high-speed Shinkansen train service

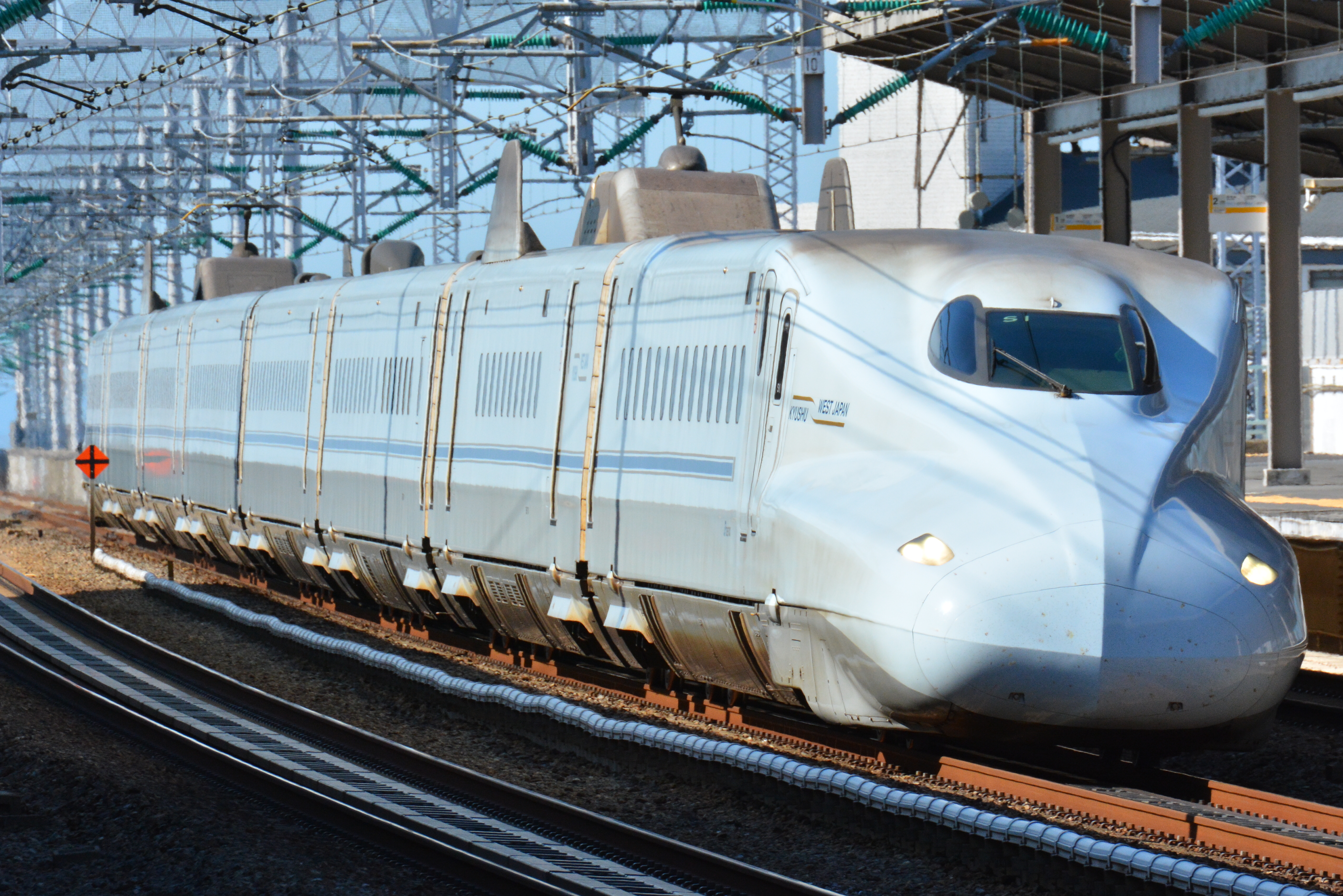
- N700-7000 series set, November 2019

Overview
- Service type: Shinkansen (Express)
- Status: Operational
- First service: 1 October 1961 (Limited express); 12 March 2011 (Shinkansen)
- Current operators: JR Kyushu; JR West
- Former operator: JNR

Route
- Termini: Shin-Osaka; Kagoshima-Chuo
- Lines used: Kyushu Shinkansen, San'yō Shinkansen, Tokaido Shinkansen

On-board services
- Class: Standard + Green
- Catering facilities: Trolley service

Technical
- Rolling stock: N700-7000/8000 series
- Track gauge: 1,435 mm (4 ft 8 1/2 in) standard gauge
- Electrification: Overhead line, 25 kV 60 Hz AC
- Operating speed: San'yō Shinkansen: 300 km/h (190 mph); Kyushu Shinkansen: 260 km/h (160 mph)

The Mizuho (みずほ) is a limited-stop Shinkansen service operated between Shin-Osaka and Kagoshima-Chuo in Japan since 12 March 2011, following the completion of the Kyushu Shinkansen. The name was formerly used for a limited express sleeping car service operated by JNR from 1961, which ran from Tokyo to Kumamoto, and was discontinued in December 1994. The name "mizuho (瑞穂)" literally means "abundant rice" in Japanese and "harvest" in the figurative sense. It was also an ancient name of Japan.

As with the existing Nozomi service that operates on the Tokaido and Sanyo Shinkansen lines, foreigners traveling with a Japan Rail Pass are required to purchase a special ticket to use the Mizuho service.

== Train formation ==
Mizuho services are operated by 8-car JR West N700-7000 series and JR Kyushu N700-8000 series trainsets, with car 1 at the Kagoshima-Chuo end. All seats are non-smoking.

Car No.	1	2	3	4	5	6	7	8
Class	Non-reserved	Non-reserved	Non-reserved	Reserved	Reserved	Green	Reserved	Reserved
Facilities	Toilet		Smoking compartment (discontinued), toilet		Toilet		Smoking compartment (discontinued), toilet, wheelchair space	

In 2021, payphones were removed from cars 3 and 8.

In 2024, the smoking compartments were discontinued as smoking is banned on all Shinkansen lines.

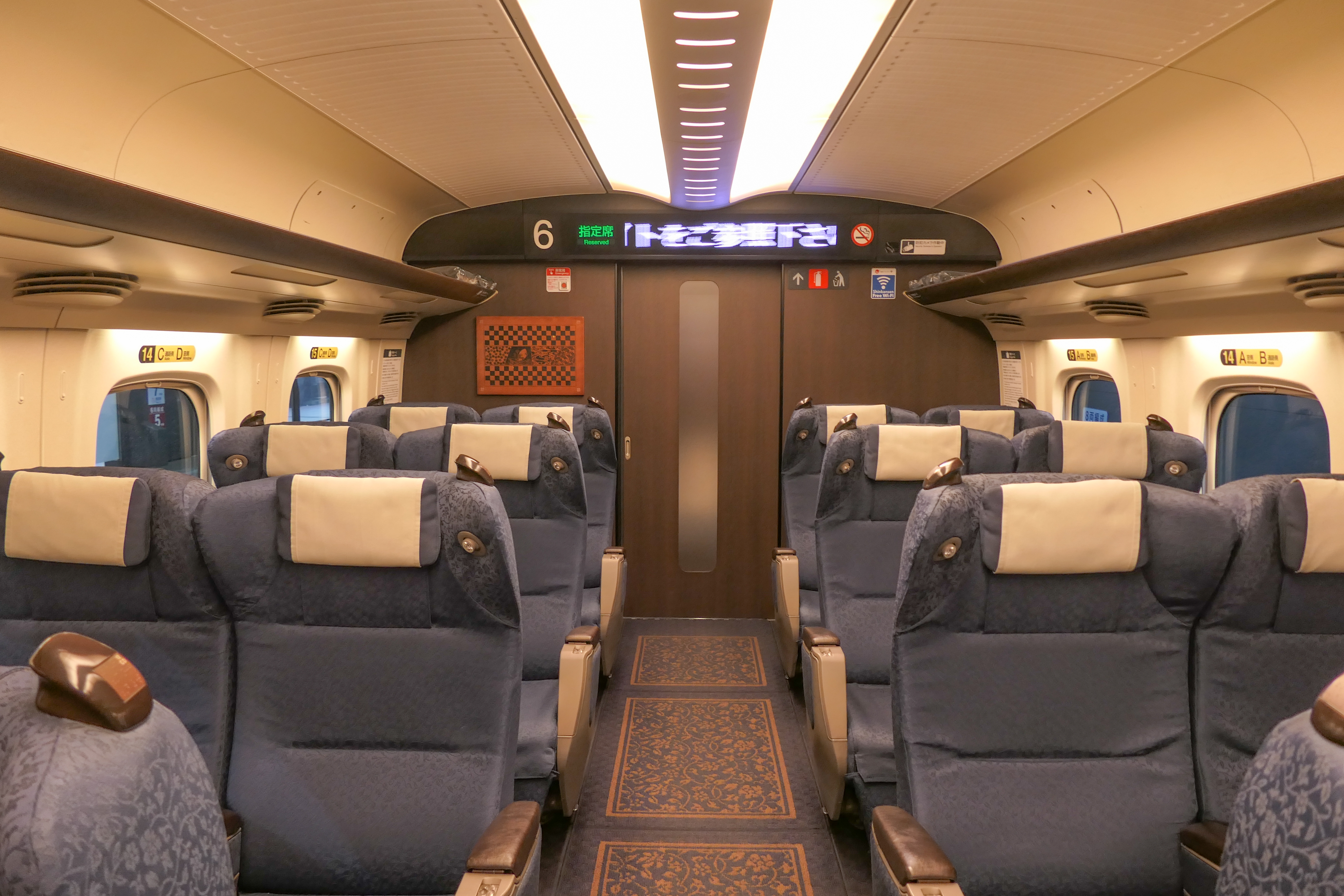
N700-7000 series Green car interior

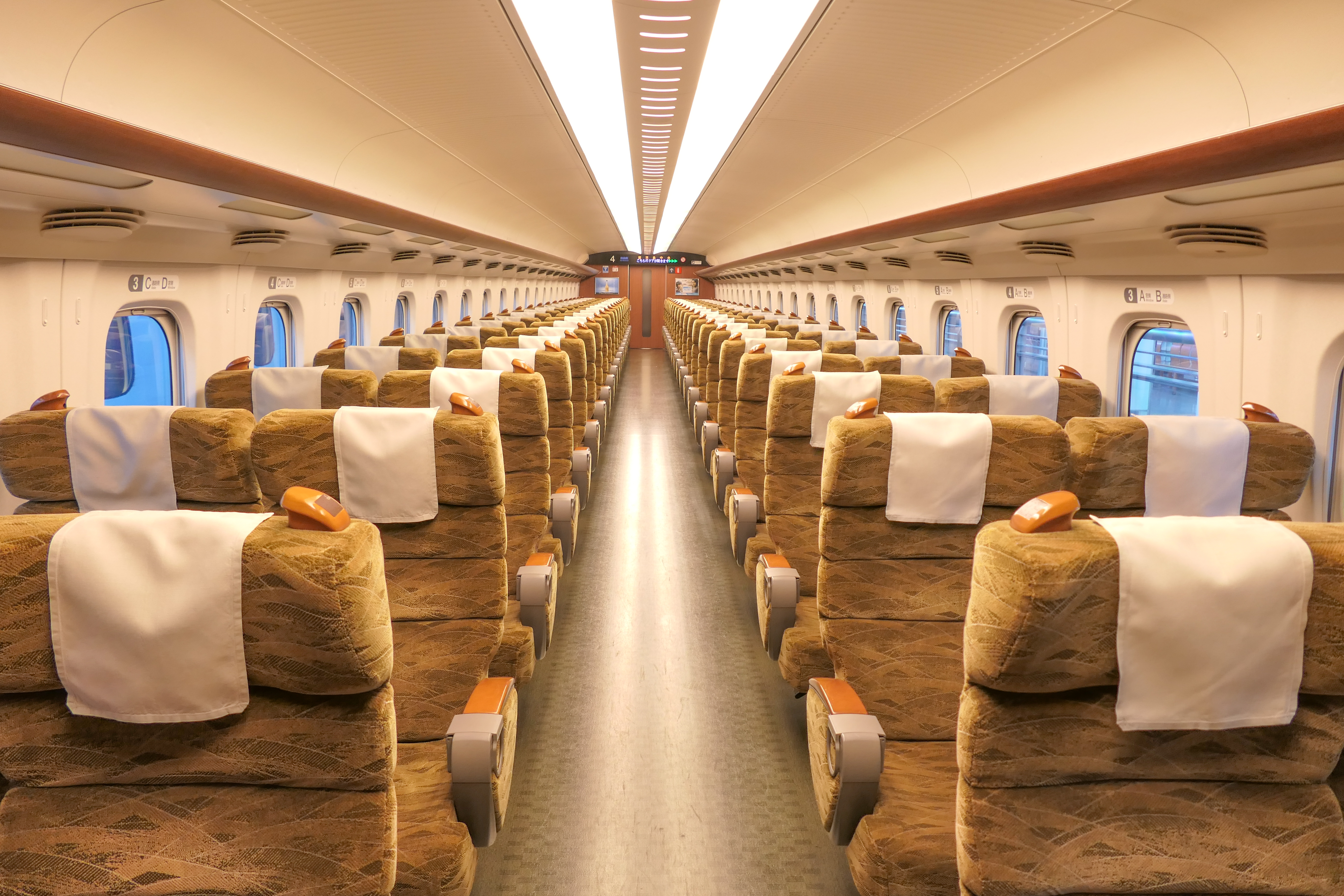
N700-7000 series standard-class reserved car interior

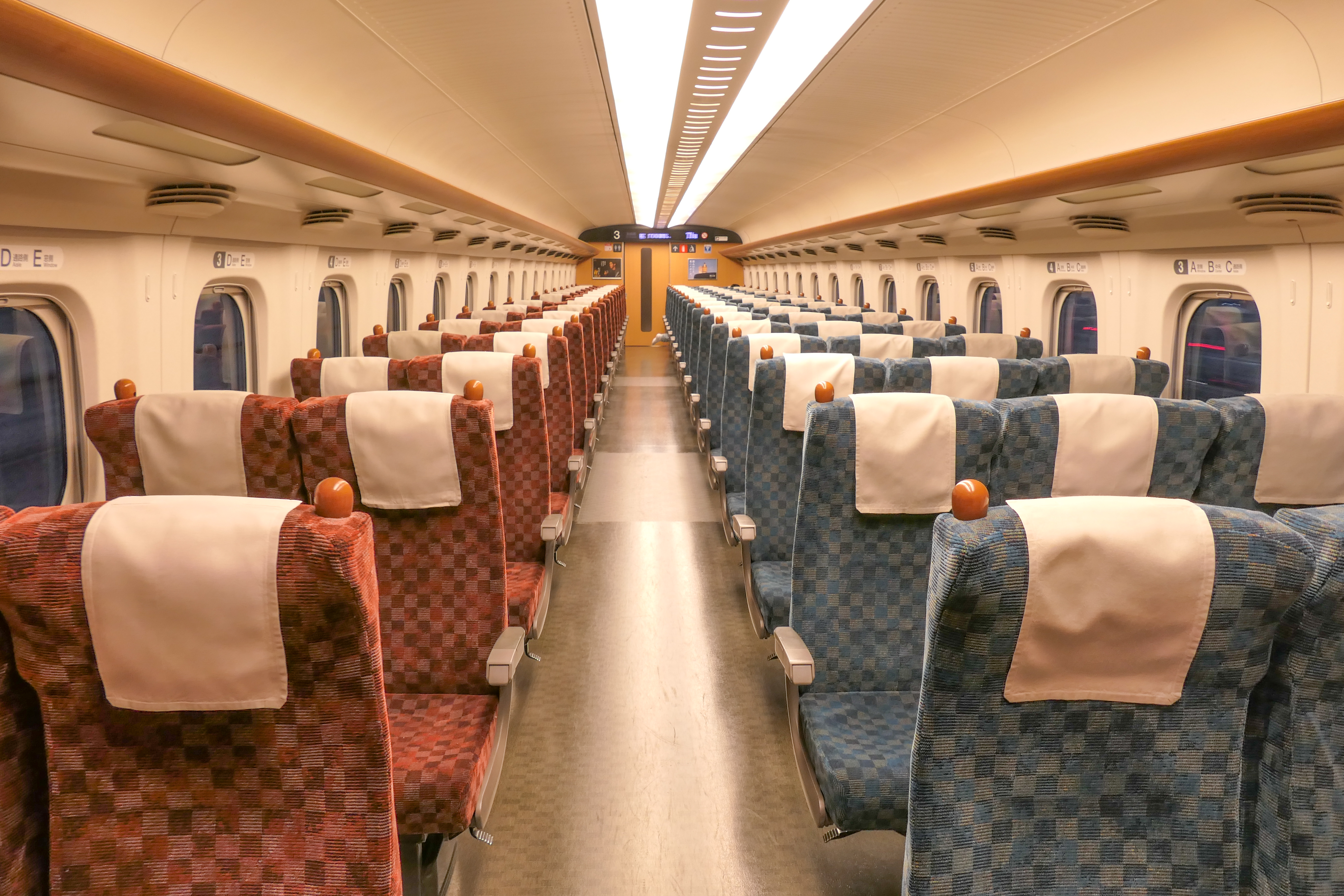
N700-7000 series standard-class non-reserved car interior

== History ==
=== Limited express sleeping car service ===
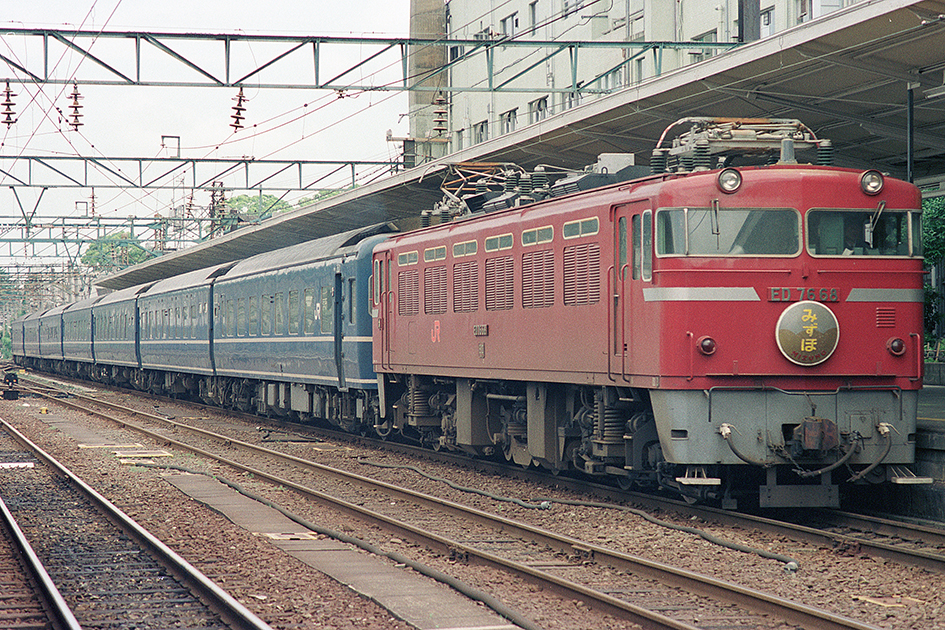
Mizuho service at Kumamoto, hauled by an ED76 electric locomotive, 1987

The Mizuho was first introduced on 1 October 1961 as a seasonal limited express sleeper train service, which ran from Tokyo to Kumamoto in Kyushu, supplementing the three existing limited express services, Asakaze, Sakura, and Hayabusa, operating between Tokyo and Kyushu. From 1 October the following year, the service was upgraded from a "seasonal" service to become a daily service.

The typical formation at this time was as shown below, with car 1 at the Kumamoto end. Cars 8 to 13 ran only between Hakata and Tokyo.

Car No.	1	2	3	4	5	6	7	8	9	10	11	12	13
Type	HaFu 43	RoNe 10	Ro 54	Shi 17	HaNe 11	HaNe 11	HaFu 45	HaNe 17	HaNe 17	HaNe 17	HaNe 17	HaNe 17	HaFu 43

From 1 June 1963, 20 series coaches were added to the formation, and the train divided and joined at Moji to serve Oita via the Nippo Main Line in addition to Kumamoto.

The schedule was as shown below.

Service	From	To
Down	Tokyo (18:20)	Oita (12:55) / Kumamoto (13:20)
Up	Kumamoto (16:30) / Oita (16:50)	Tokyo (11:30)

The typical formation at this time was as shown below, with car 1 at the Kumamoto end. Cars 1 to 7 ran between Tokyo and Kumamoto, while cars 8 to 13 ran between Tokyo and Oita.

Car No.		1	2	3	4	5	6	7	8	9	10	11	12	13
Type	Ni 22	RoNe 22	Shi 20	HaNe 20	HaNe 20	HaNe 20	HaNe 20	HaFu 21	RoNe 21	HaNe 20	HaNe 20	HaNe 20	HaNe 20	HaFu 20

From October 1964, the Mizuho service once again became a direct service between Tokyo and Kumamoto following the introduction of the Fuji service running between Tokyo and Oita.

The typical formation at this time was as shown below, with car 1 at the Kumamoto end. Cars 8 to 14 ran between Tokyo and Hakata only.

Car No.		1	2	3	4	5	6	7	8	9	10	11	12	13	14
Type	Ni 22	RoNe 21	Shi 20	HaNe 20	HaNe 20	HaNe 20	HaNe 20	HaFu 21	RoNe 21	HaNe 20	HaNe 20	HaNe 20	HaNe 20	HaNe 20	HaFu 20

From March 1972, new 14 series sleeping cars were introduced on Mizuho services, replacing the 20 series cars.

From June 1991, dining car facilities were discontinued, and the Mizuho service itself was discontinued from 3 December 1994.

=== Shinkansen ===
On 20 October 2010, it was formally announced by JR West and JR Kyushu that the Mizuho name would be used once again from 12 March 2011 for the new limited-stop Shinkansen services operating between Shin-Osaka and Kagoshima-Chūō using new JR West and JR Kyushu N700-7000 and N700-8000 series 8-car trainsets with a fastest journey time of 3 hours 45 minutes, some 25 minutes faster than the Sakura services.

Most trains stop only at Shin-Kobe, Okayama, Hiroshima, Kokura, Hakata, and Kumamoto, operating at a maximum speed of 300 km/h (190 mph) on the Sanyo Shinkansen and 260 km/h (160 mph) on the Kyushu Shinkansen. The services are aimed primarily at the business market, with two return services in the morning and two in the evening. An additional daily return working was added from 17 March 2012, increasing the number of services from four to five.

By 15 March 2014, there were six daily return workings per direction, with two trains stopping at Himeji to increase connectivity in the Kansai region. As of 14 March 2020, there are eight daily return workings per direction, with some trains making additional stops at Sendai, Kurume, Shin-Yamaguchi, Fukuyama or Himeji.

== See also ==
- List of named passenger trains of Japan
- Blue Train (Japan)
