= Shin-Minamata Station =

Railway station in Minamata, Kumamoto Prefecture, Japan

Shin-Minamata Station 新水俣駅
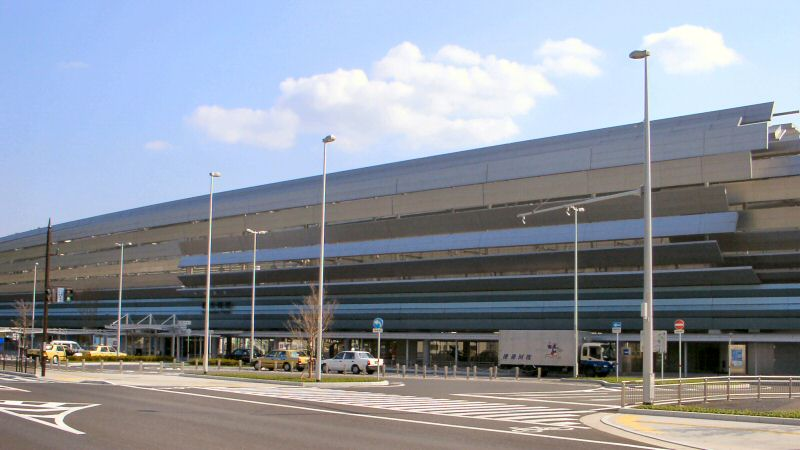
- Shin-Minamata Station

General information
- Location: 305 Hatsuno, Minamata-shi, Kumamoto-ken 867-0002; Japan
- Coordinates: 32°12′40″N 130°25′45″E
- Operator: JR Kyushu; Hisatsu Orange Railway
- Lines: Kyūshū Shinkansen; Hisatsu Orange Railway Line
- Platforms: 1 side + 2 island platforms

Other information
- Station code: OR12

History
- Opened: 13 March 2004

Services
Preceding station	JR Kyushu	Following station
Izumi towards Kagoshima-Chūō	Kyūshū Shinkansen Sakura Tsubame	Shin-Yatsushiro towards Hakata
Location
- Location within Kumamoto Prefecture Location within Kyushu Location within Japan

Shin-Minamata Station (新水俣駅, Shin-Minamata-eki) is a junction passenger railway station located in the city of Minamata, Kumamoto, Japan. It is operated by Kyushu Railway Company (JR Kyushu) and by the third-sector railway company Hisatsu Orange Railway.

== Lines ==
The station is served by the Kyushu Shinkansen and is 194.1 kilometers from the starting point of the line at Hakata and 816.4 kilometers from Shin-Osaka. It is also served by the Hisatsu Orange Railway Line that follows the former coastal route of the JR Kyushu Kagoshima Main Line connecting Yatsushiro and Sendai. It is located 45.8 km from the starting point of the line at Yatsushiro.

== Station layout ==
The JR portion of the station consists of one elevated side platform and one elevated island platform.There are no passing tracks and platform safety barriers have been installed for safety. The station has a Midori no Madoguchi staffed ticket office.The station building was designed by Makoto Sei Watanabe and opened on 13 March 2004. The Hisatsu Orange Railway portion of the station has one island platform and two tracks. The platform is accessed via a level crossing. There is no station building and the station is unattended.

=== Platforms ===
11/12	■ Kyushu Shinkansen	for Kumamoto, Hakata, and Shin-Ōsaka (island platform)
13	■ Kyushu Shinkansen	for Izumi, Sendai, and Kagoshima-Chūō (side platform)

1	■ ■ Hisatsu Orange Railway	for Minamata and Izumi
2	■ ■ Hisatsu Orange Railway	for Yatsushiro and Shin-Yatsushiro

== Gallery ==
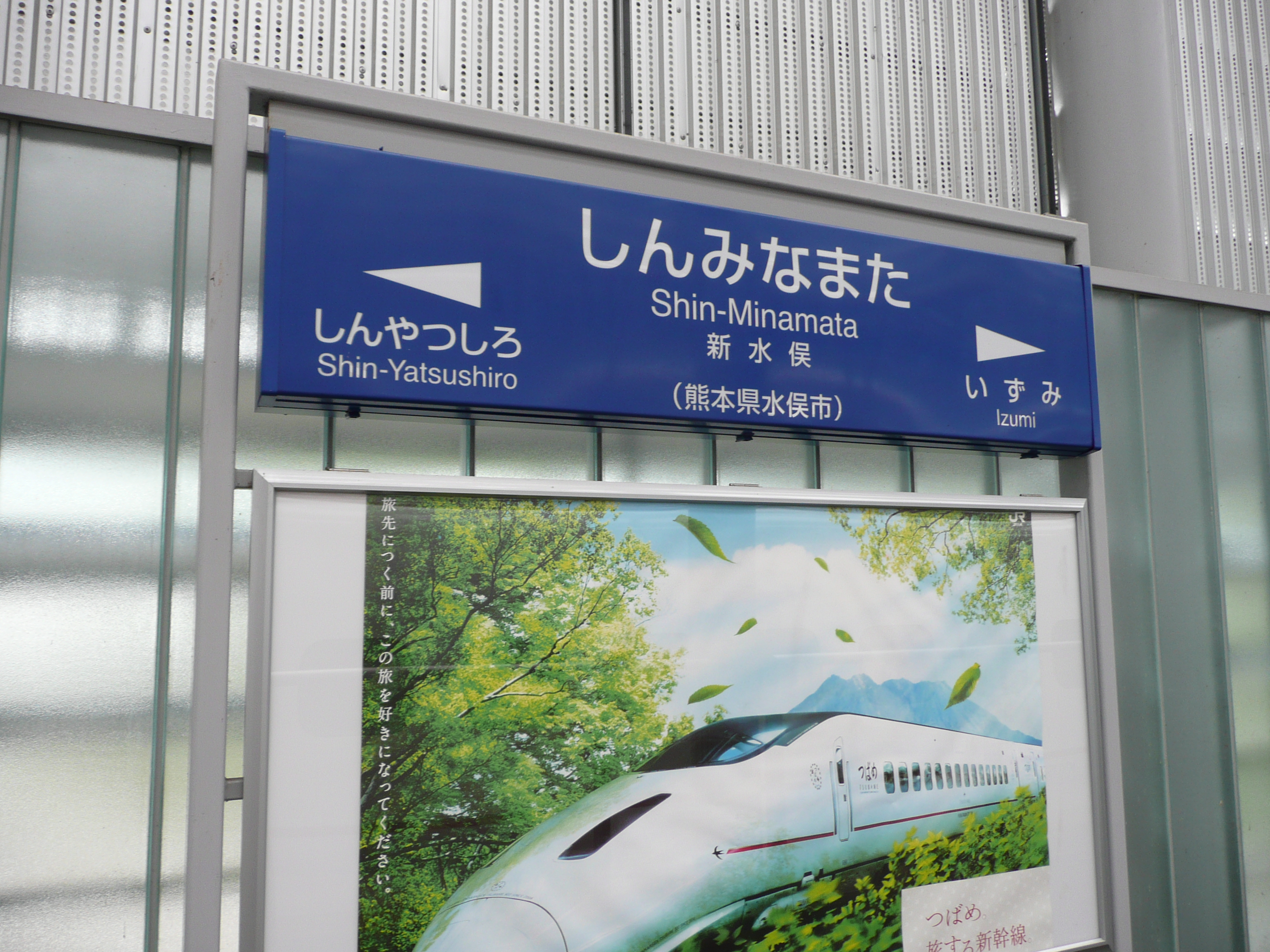
Station sign (Shinkansen)

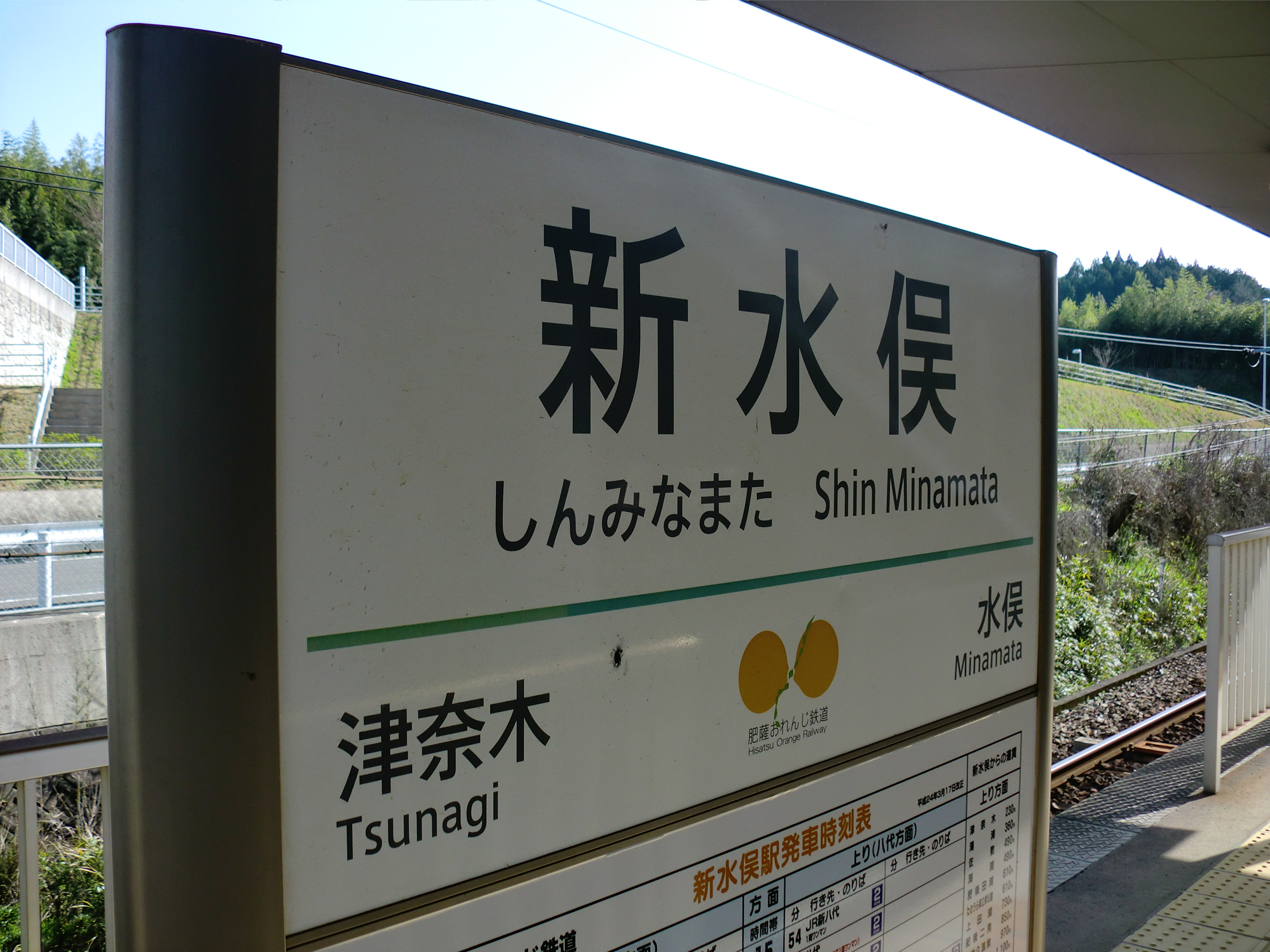
Station sign (Hisatsu Orange Railway)

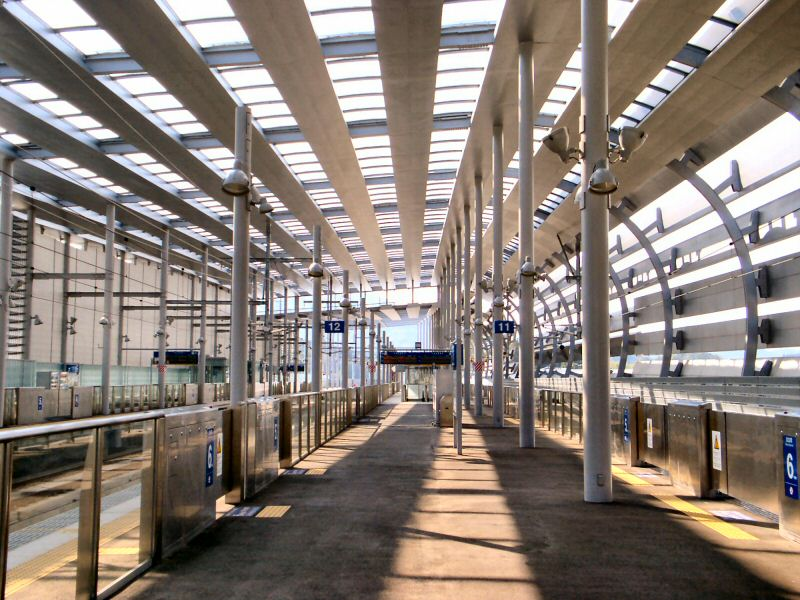
Shinkansen platforms

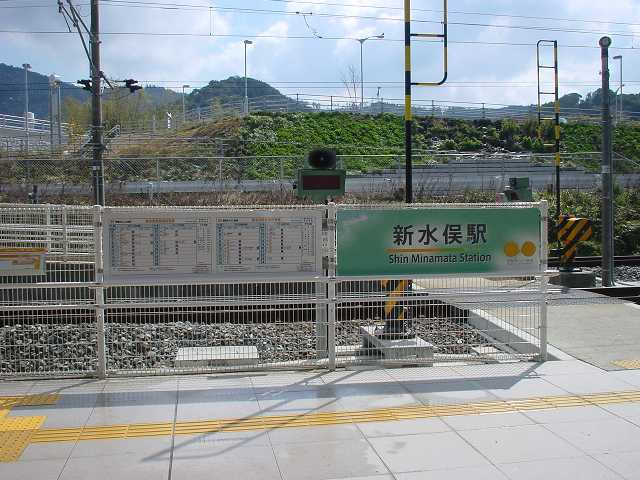
Hisatsu Orange Railway

== Adjacent stations ==
←	Service	→
Hisatsu Orange Railway Line
Tsunagi	-	Minamata

== History ==
On19 September 1968, Japan National Railway (JNR) established Hatsuno Signal Stop. It was elevated to a full station and named "Shin-Minamata" on 13 March 2004 with the opening of the Kyushu Shinkansen. The JR Kyushu portion of the statin was transferred to the control of the Hisatsu Orange Railway.

== Passenger statistics ==
In fiscal 2020, the JR portion of the station was used by an average of 344 passengers daily (boarding passengers only), and it ranked 257th among the busiest stations of JR Kyushu. The average daily passenger traffic for the Hisatsu Orange Railway Line in fiscal 2019 was 91 passengers.

== Surrounding area ==
- Minamata Castle Ruins
- Minamata Municipal Hatsuno Housing Complex
- Japan National Route 3
- Japan National Route 268

== See also ==
- List of railway stations in Japan
