= Shin-Yatsushiro Station =

Railway station in Yatsushiro, Kumamoto Prefecture, Japan

Shin-Yatsushiro Station 新八代駅
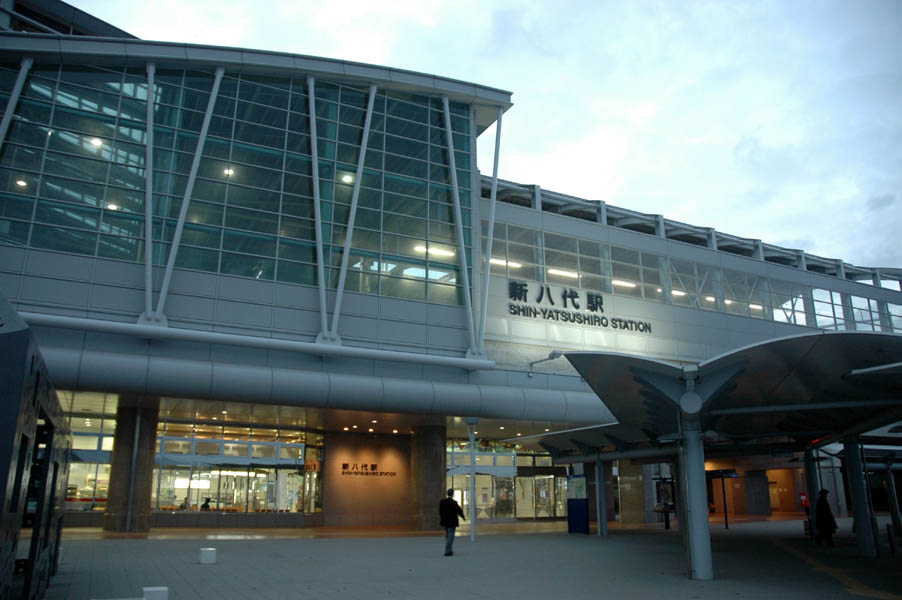
- Entrance of Shin-Yatsushiro Station

General information
- Location: 4774-2 Kamihiokicho, Yatsushiro-shi, Kumamoto-ken 866-0824; Japan
- Coordinates: 32°31′7″N 130°38′5″E
- Operator: JR Kyushu
- Lines: Kyūshū Shinkansen; ■ Kagoshima Main Line
- Platforms: 4 side platforms (2 for Shinkansen, 2 for conventional lines)
- Tracks: 4 (2 for Shinkansen, 2 for conventional lines)

Construction
- Structure type: Elevated (Shinkansen); At grade (conventional)

Other information
- Website: Official website

History
- Opened: 13 March 2004

Passengers
- FY2020: 1305

Services
Preceding station	JR Kyushu	Following station
Shinkansen
Shin-Minamata towards Kagoshima-Chūō	Kyūshū Shinkansen Sakura Tsubame	Kumamoto towards Hakata
Local
Yatsushiro towards Kagoshima	Kagoshima Main Line Kumamoto Liner Local	Senchō towards Mojikō
Location
- Location within Kumamoto Prefecture Location within Japan

Shin-Yatsushiro Station (新八代駅, Shin-Yatsushiro-eki) is a junction passenger railway station located in the city of Yatsushiro, Kumamoto Prefecture, Japan. It is operated by JR Kyushu.

== Lines ==
Shin-Yatsushiro Station is served by the Kyushu Shinkansen and is 151.3 kilometers from the starting point of the line at Hakata and 773.6 kilometers from Shin-Osaka. The station is also served by the Kagoshima Main Line and is located 229.5 km from the starting point of the line at Mojiko.

== Layout ==
Although both the Shinkansen and conventional lines are operated by the same operator, they have separate station buildings, and although adjacent to each other, there is no transfer gate between the two lines. When transferring, passengers must exit the ticket gates. The Shinkansen station has a Midori no Madoguchi staffed ticket office. The platform is an elevated station with two side platforms and two tracks. There is no passing track, and a movable safety fence is installed.

The conventional line station has two side platforms and two tracks, and has an elevated station building. There are crossover tracks, and a siding (siding) for turnarounds for vehicles entering from the Hisatsu Orange Railway Line on the Hakata side. In addition, the Hisatsu Line (one morning train that stops at this station and returns to the station), and some trains that run directly to the Hisatsu Orange Railway Line (one daytime and two evening local trains bound for Izumi and one evening Orange Restaurant train that stops at this station and returns to the station) use the crossover toward Kagoshima from the upbound Kumamoto platform and return to Kagoshima.

=== Platforms ===
1	■ ■ Kagoshima Main Line	for Yatsushiro
2	■ ■ Kagoshima Main Line	for Kumamoto
11	■ Kyushu Shinkansen	for Kumamoto and Hakata
12	■ Kyushu Shinkansen	for Kagoshima-Chūō

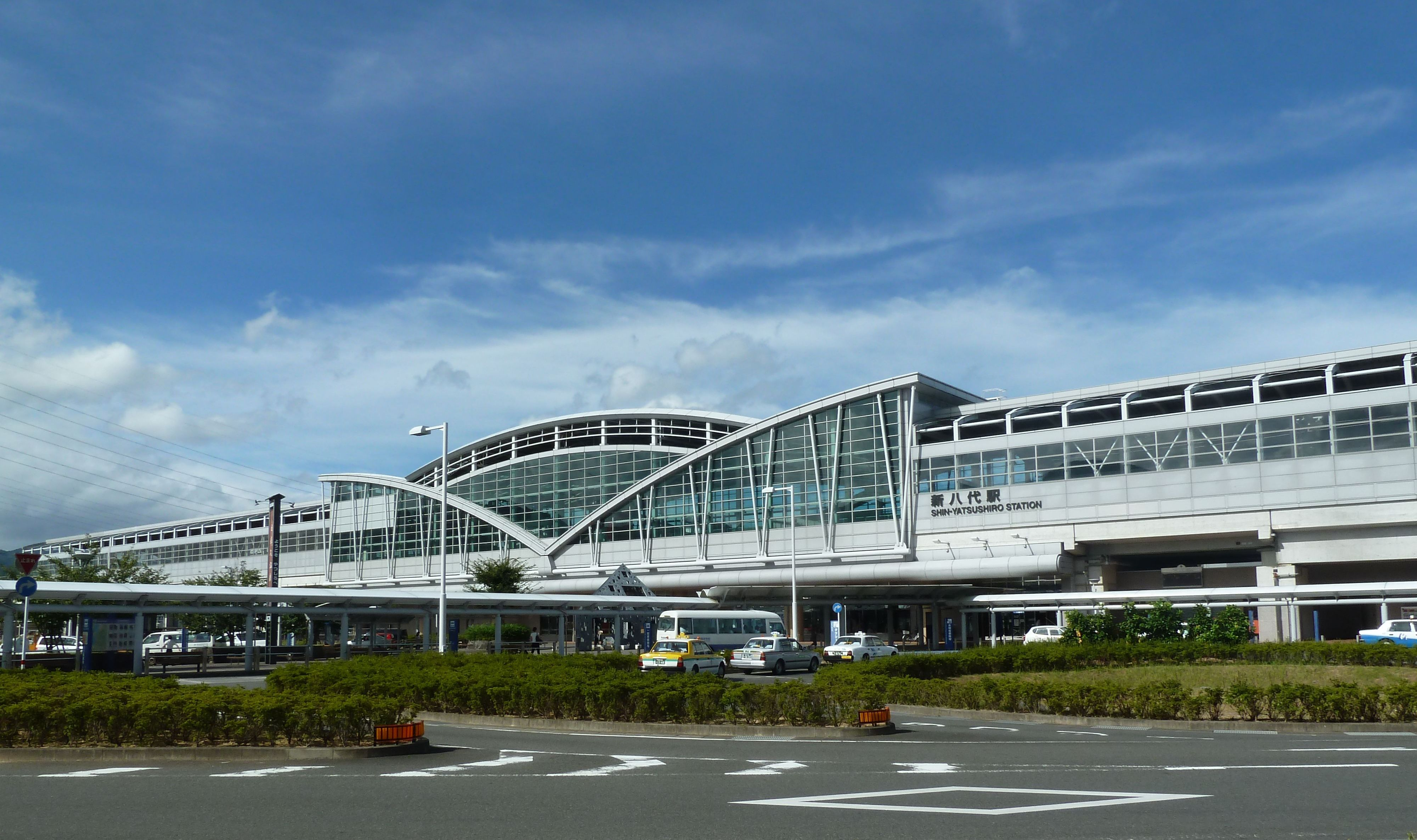
East Exit (Shinkansen)

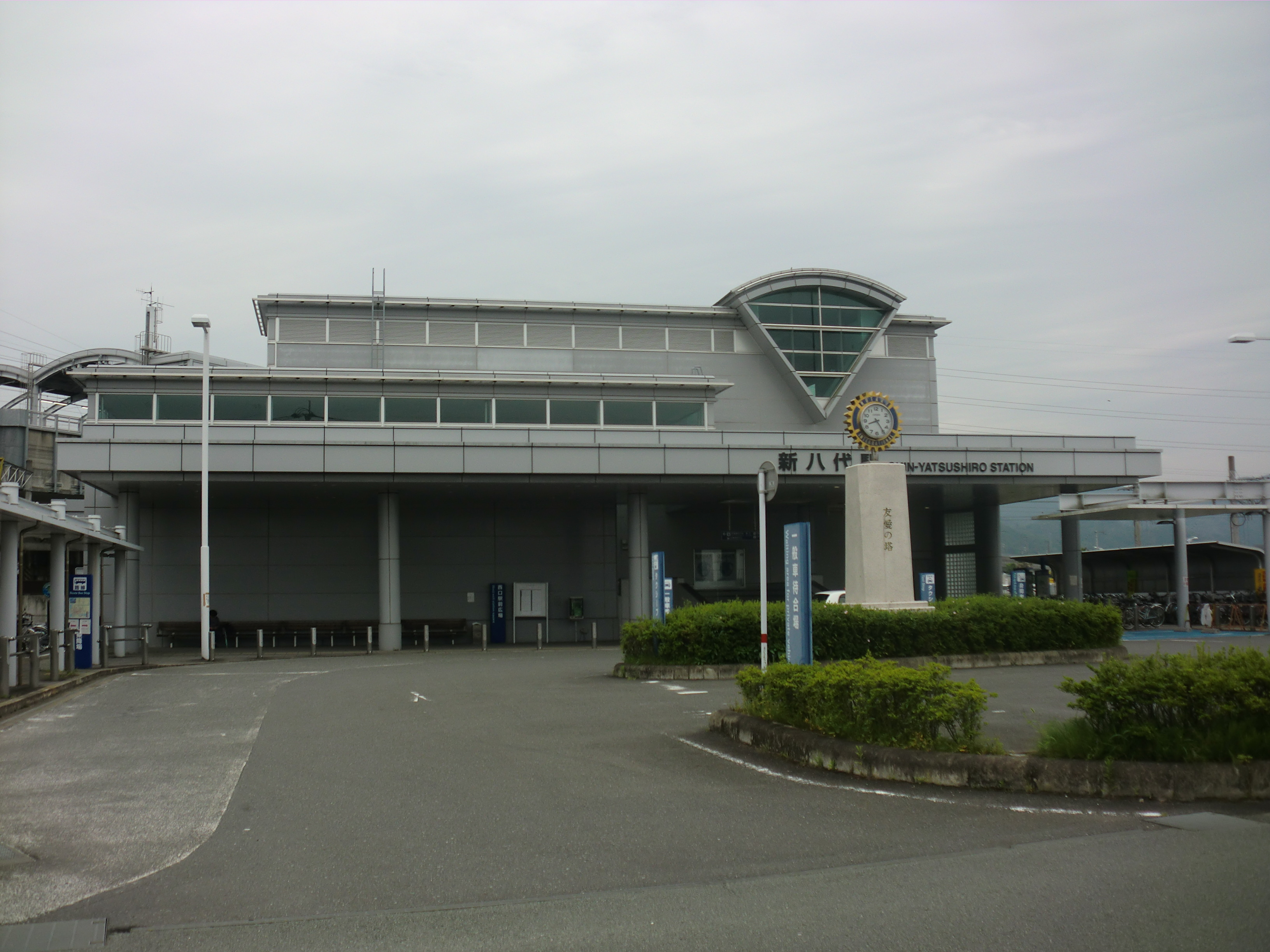
West Exit (conventional lines)

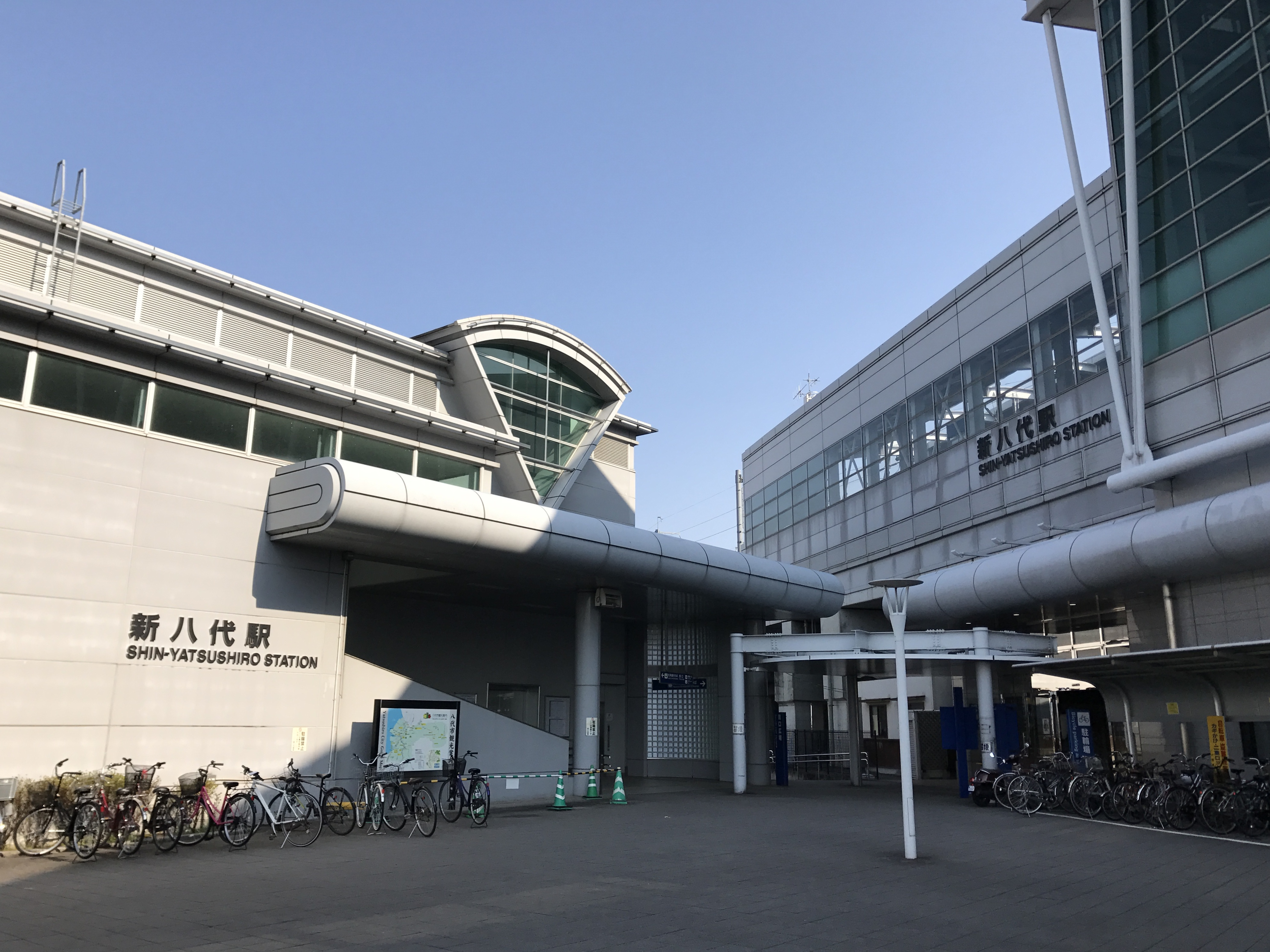
South Exit

== History ==
The station opened on 13 March 2004, to coincide with the opening of a section of the Kyushu Shinkansen high speed railway line. A special elevated spur ran from north of the station to the Shinkansen platform from 2004 to 2011 and was used by Relay Tsubame limited express trains from Hakata on the Kagoshima Line provided the link to the Shinkansen line, and Shin-Yatsushiro was designed to facilitate an easy and fast connection between the Relay Tsubame train and the Tsubame shinkansen train on the same platform. The spur line was not used by regular services, but was utilized in 2014 for reliability trials of the Gauge Change Train between Kumamoto and Kagoshima-Chuo Station, including gauge changing on the spur line. The trials were originally planned to run for three years starting in April 2014, but were suspended that December after defects were found in the train bogies.

The Kyushu Shinkansen Tsubame was operational from Shin-Yatushiro to Kagoshima-Chuo station in Kagoshima until 2011, when the Shinkansen was extended north to Hakata station in Fukuoka and joined with the Sanyo Shinkansen line.

On 8 November 2021, a man was arrested at the station after an attempted arson on board a Sakura service.

== Passenger statistics ==
In fiscal 2020, the station was used by an average of 1305 passengers daily (boarding passengers only), and it ranked 112th among the busiest stations of JR Kyushu.

== Surrounding area ==
- Kumamoto Prefecture Yatsushiro General Office
- Nobuhiko Matsunaka Sports Museum

== See also ==
- List of railway stations in Japan
