= List of mergers in Fukuoka Prefecture =

This is a list of mergers in Fukuoka Prefecture, Japan, since the start of the Heisei Era (January 1989).

== Mergers ==
- On October 1, 1997 - the town of Koga (from Kasuya District) was elevated to city status.
- On April 1, 2003 - the town of Genkai (from Munakata District) was merged into the expanded city of Munakata.
- On January 24, 2005 - the towns of Fukuma and Tsuyazaki (both from Munakata District) were merged to create the city of Fukutsu.
- On February 5, 2005 - the town of Kitano (from Mii District), the towns of Jōjima and Mizuma (both from Mizuma District), and the town of Tanushimaru (from Ukiha District) were merged into the expanded city of Kurume.
- On March 20, 2005 - the former town of Ukiha absorbed the town of Yoshii (both from Ukiha District) to create the city of Ukiha. Ukiha District was dissolved as a result of this merger.
- On March 21, 2005 - the old city of Yanagawa absorbed the towns of Mitsuhashi and Yamato (both from Yamato District) to create the new and expanded city of Yanagawa.
- On March 22, 2005 - the towns of Miwa and Yasu (both from Asakura District) were merged to create the town of Chikuzen.
- On March 28, 2005 - the villages of Hōshuyama and Koishiwara (both from Asakura District) were merged to create the village of Tōhō.
- On March 28, 2005 - the village of Ōshima (from Munakata District) was merged into the expanded city of Munakata. Munakata District was dissolved as a result of this merger.
- On October 11, 2005 - the villages of Shin'yoshitomi and Taihei (both from Chikujō District) were merged to create the town of Kōge.
- On January 10, 2006 - the towns and Shiida and Tsuiki (both from Chikujō District) were merged to create the town of Chikujō.
- On February 11, 2006 - the towns of Miyata and Wakamiya (both from Kurate District) were merged to create the city of Miyawaka.
- On March 6, 2006 - the towns of Akaike, Hōjō and Kanada (all from Tagawa District) were merged to create the town of Fukuchi.
- On March 20, 2006 - the former town of Asakura absorbed the town of Haki (both from Asakura District), and the city of Amagi to create the city of Asakura.
- On March 20, 2006 - the towns of Katsuyama, Saigawa and Toyotsu (all from Miyako District) were merged to create the town of Miyako.
- On March 26, 2006 - the old city of Iizuka absorbed the towns of Chikuho, Honami, Kaita and Shōnai (all from Kaho District) to create the new and expanded city of Iizuka.
- On March 27, 2006 - the city of Yamada was merged the towns of Inatsuki, Kaho and Usui (all from Kaho District) to create the city of Kama.
- On October 1, 2006 - the town of Jōyō (from Yame District) was merged into the expanded city of Yame.
- On January 29, 2007 - the towns of Setaka and Yamakawa (both from Yamato District), and the town of Takata (from Miike District) were merged to create the city of Miyama. Yamato District and Miike District were dissolved as a result of this merger.
- On January 1, 2010 - the city of Maebaru was merged with the towns of Nijō and Shima (both from Itoshima District) to create the city of Itoshima. Itoshima District was dissolved as a result of this merger.
- On February 1, 2010 - the towns of Kurogi and Tachibana, and the villages of Hoshino and Yabe (both from Yame District) were merged into the expanded city of Yame. One municipality was left in Yame District.
- On October 1, 2018 - the town of Nakagawa (from Chikushi District) was elevated to city status. Chikushi District was dissolved as a result of this merger.
