= Hiraki Station =

Railway station in Miyama, Fukuoka Prefecture, Japan

Hiraki Station 開駅
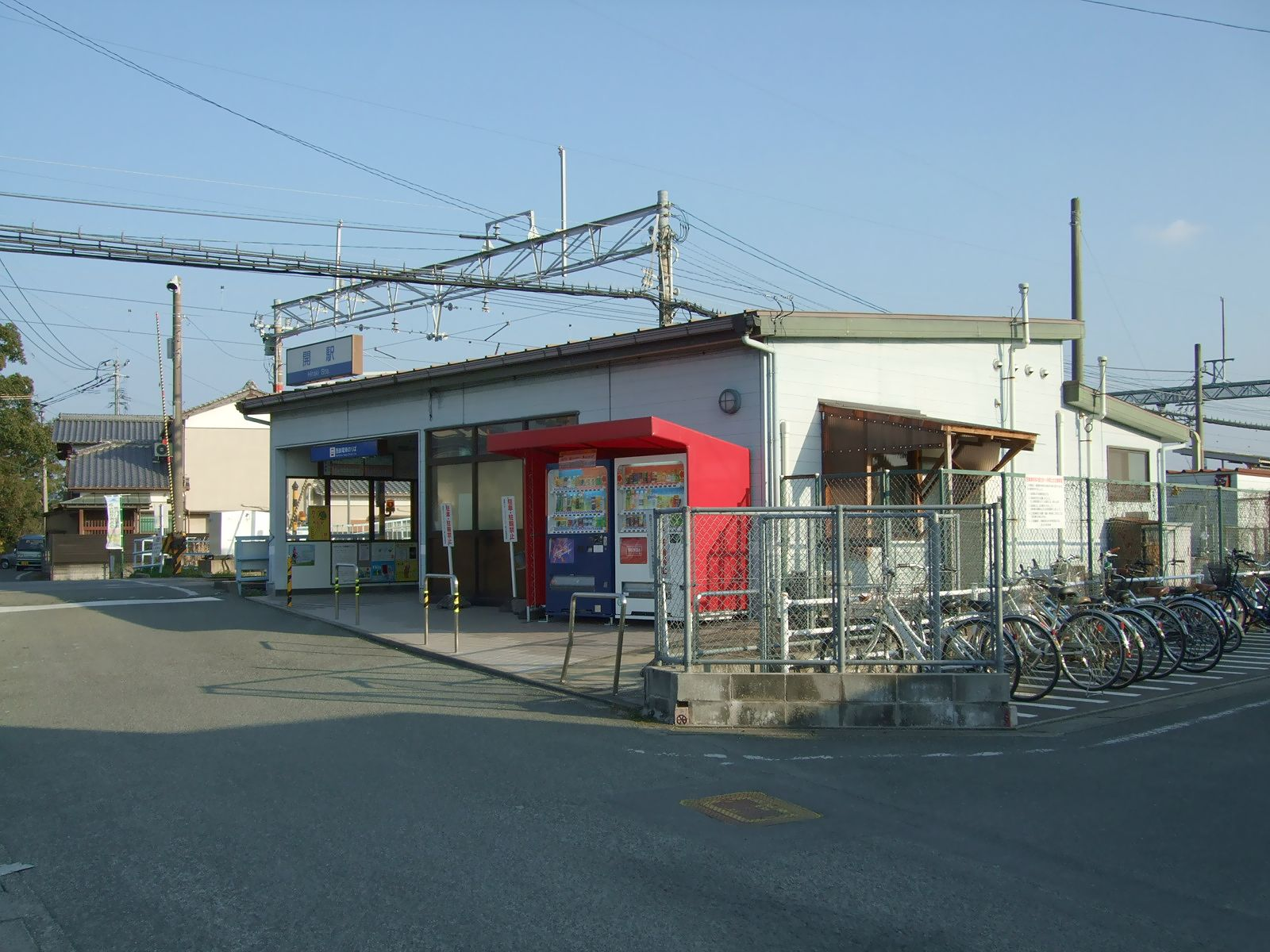
- Hiraki Station building

General information
- Location: Takatamachi Kitashingai, Miyama-shi, Fukuoka-ken 839-0204; Japan
- Coordinates: 33°5′51.75″N 130°27′9.53″E
- Operator: Nishi-Nippon Railroad
- Line: ■ Tenjin Ōmuta Line
- Distance: 66.6 km from Nishitetsu Fukuoka (Tenjin)
- Platforms: 2 side platforms
- Connections

Other information
- Status: Unstaffed
- Station code: T44
- Website: Official website

History
- Opened: 1 October 1938

Passengers
- FY2022: 562

Services
Preceding station	Nishitetsu	Following station
Enoura towards Nishitetsu Fukuoka (Tenjin)	Tenjin Ōmuta Line Local	Nishitetsu Wataze towards Ōmuta
Location
- Location within Fukuoka Prefecture Location within Japan

Hiraki Station (開駅, Hiraki-eki) is a passenger railway station located in the city of Miyama, Fukuoka, Japan. It is operated by the private transportation company Nishi-Nippon Railroad (NNR), and has station number T44.

== Lines ==
The station is served by the Nishitetsu Tenjin Ōmuta Line and is 66.6 kilometers from the starting point of the line at Nishitetsu Fukuoka (Tenjin) Station.

== Station layout ==
The station consists of two opposed side platforms connected by a level crossing. The Tenjin Ōmuta Line is single tracked in the direction of Kamachi Station and is double tracked from this station to the end of the line at Ōmuta Station.

=== Platforms ===
1	■ Tenjin Ōmuta Line	for Ōmuta
2	■ Tenjin Ōmuta Line	for Daizenji, Nishitetsu Kurume, Nishitetsu Futsukaichi, Fukuoka and Nishitetsu Yanagawa

== Gallery ==
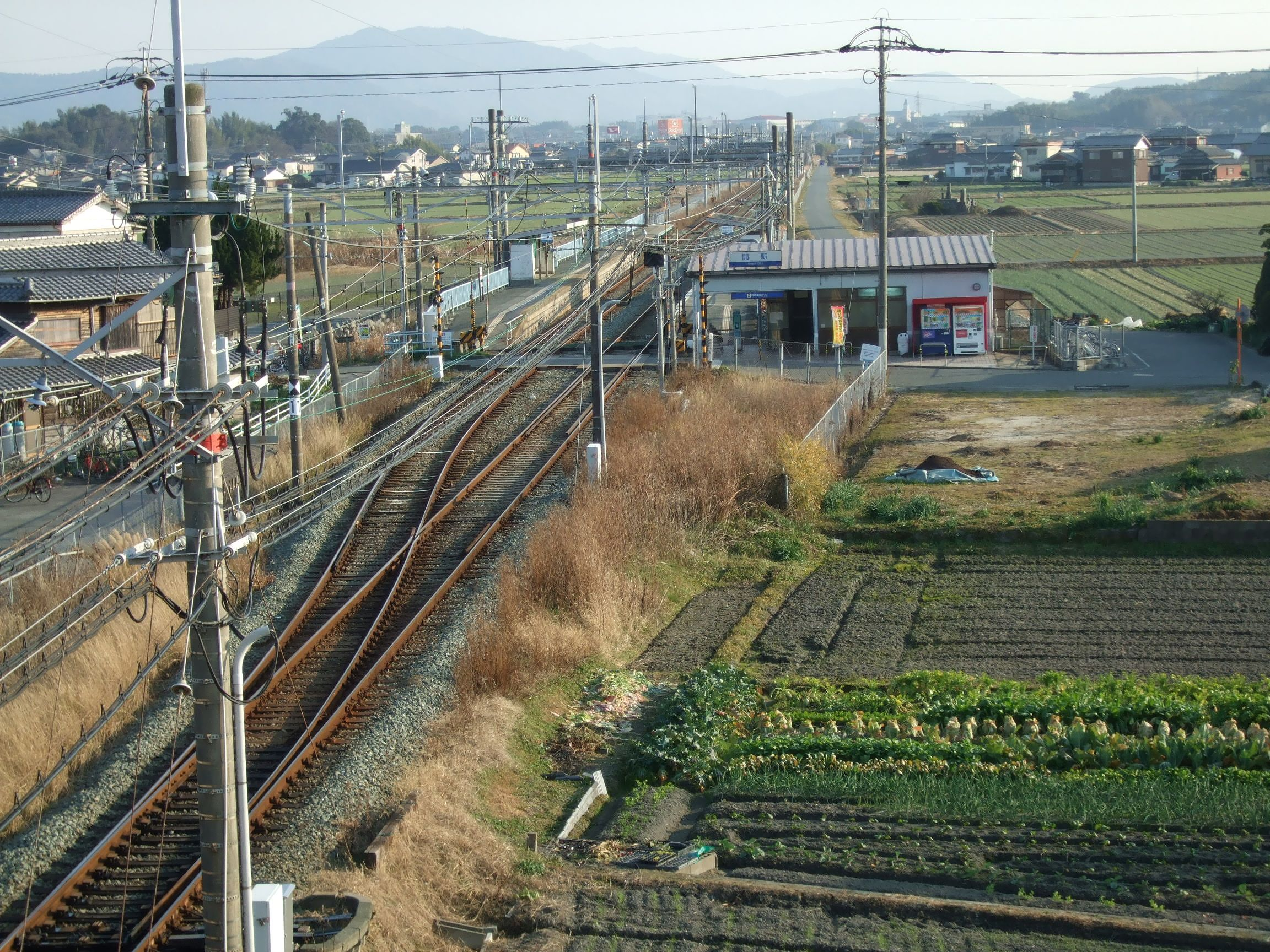
Panoramic view of the premises. The front is towards Fukuoka (Tenjin) and the back is towards Omuta.

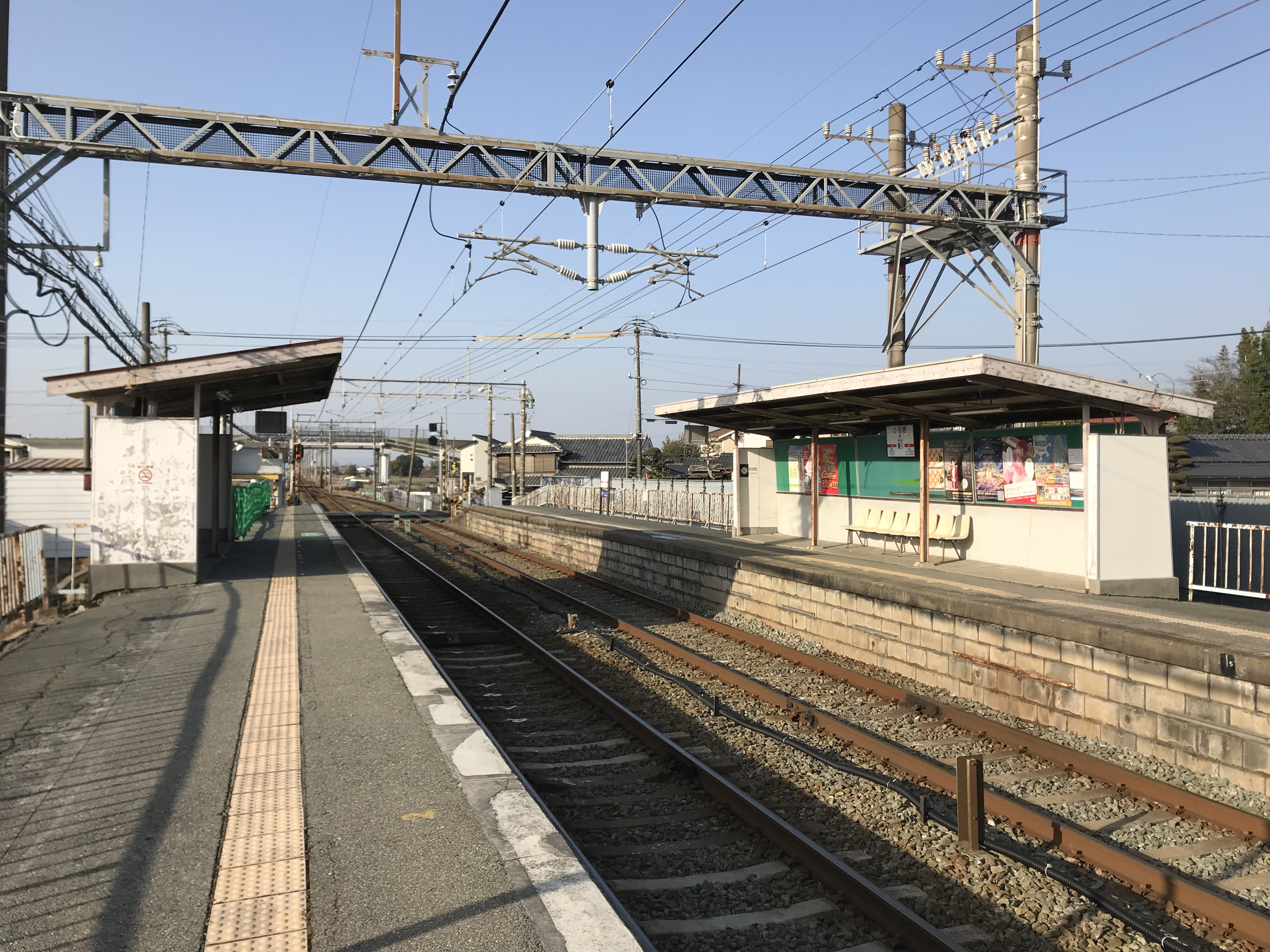
Platform

== History ==
The station opened on 1 October 1938. The company merged with the Kyushu Electric Tramway on 19 September 1942. The company changed its name to Nishi-Nippon Railway three days later, on 22 September 1942.

== Passenger statistics ==
In fiscal 2022, the station was used by 562 passengers daily.

== Surrounding area ==
- Takada Town Office
- Wataze Station
- Yokokura Hospital
- Takatanoseyama Park
- Hiraki Elementary School
- Futakawa Elementary School
- Japan National Route 208
- Japan National Route 209

== See also ==
- List of railway stations in Japan
