= Wataze =

Wataze may refer to:

- Nishitetsu Wataze Station, train station in Ōmuta, Fukuoka
- Wataze Station, railway station on the Kagoshima Main Line in Miyama, Fukuoka Prefecture
