= Setaka Station =

Railway station in Miyama, Fukuoka Prefecture, Japan

JB 22 Setaka Station 瀬高駅
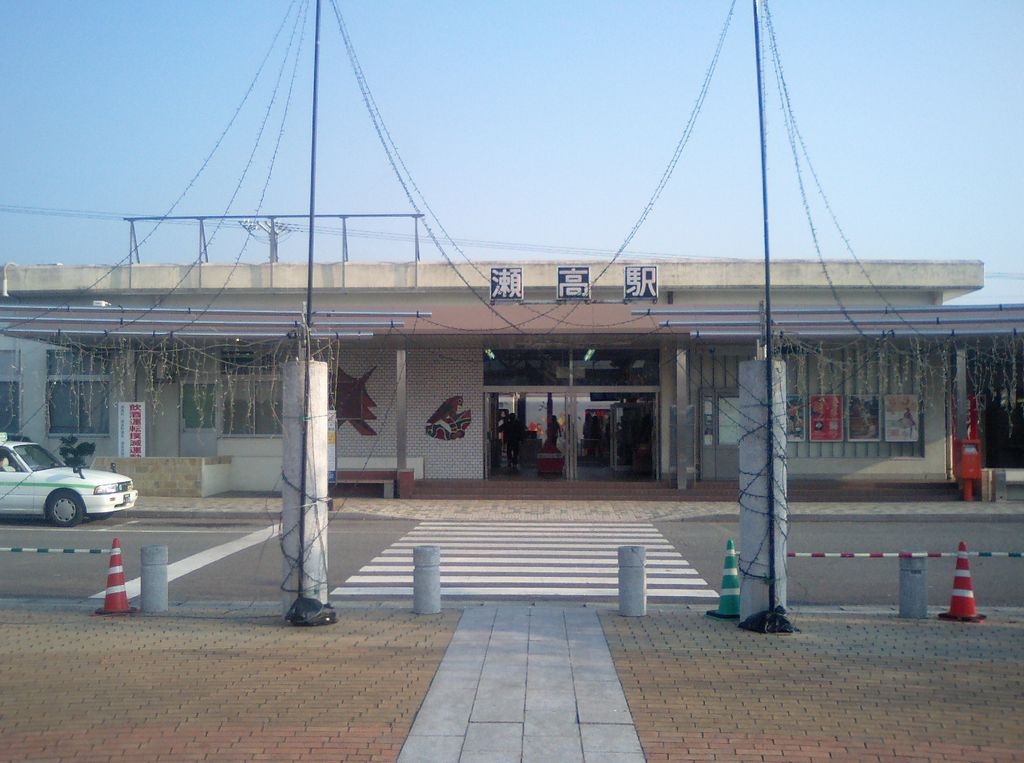
- Setaka Station in 2006

General information
- Location: Setakamachi Shimonosho, Miyama-shi, Fukuoka-ken 835-0024; Japan
- Coordinates: 33°09′25″N 130°29′07″E
- Operator: JR Kyushu
- Line: JB Kagoshima Main Line
- Platforms: 1 side + 1 island platforms
- Tracks: 3 + 1 siding

Construction
- Structure type: At grade
- Accessible: Yes - footbridge to platforms equipped with elevators

Other information
- Status: Staffed ticket window (Midori no Madoguchi)
- Website: Official website

History
- Opened: 1 April 1891
- Former names: Yabegawa (until 1942); Setaka-machi (1942 - 1956)

Passengers
- FY2020: 779 daily

Services
Preceding station	JR Kyushu	Following station
Minami-Setaka towards Kagoshima	Kagoshima Main Line Local	Chikugo-Funagoya towards Mojikō
Ōmuta towards Kagoshima	Kagoshima Main Line Rapid	Chikugo-Funagoya towards Mojikō
Location
- Location within Fukuoka Prefecture Location within Japan

Setaka Station (瀬高駅, Setaka-eki) is a passenger railway station located in the city of Miyama, Fukuoka Prefecture, Japan. It is operated by JR Kyushu.

== Lines ==
The station is served by the Kagoshima Main Line and is located 135.2 km from the starting point of the line at Mojiko. Only local services on the line stop at the station.

== Layout ==
The station consists of a side platform and an island platform serving three tracks; however one side of the island platform is not in use. The station building is a modern, flat-roofed concrete structure which houses a ticket window, automatic ticket vending machines and a waiting area. Access to the island platform is by means of a footbridge equipped with elevators. The footbridge also has an entrance on the other side of the tracks from the station.

Management of the station has been outsourced to the JR Kyushu Tetsudou Eigyou Co., a wholly owned subsidiary of JR Kyushu specialising in station services. It staffs the ticket counter which is equipped with a Midori no Madoguchi facility.

=== Platforms ===
1	■ JB Kagoshima Main Line	for Kurume, Tosu and Hakata
3	■ JB Kagoshima Main Line	for Ōmuta, Kumamoto and Yatsushiro

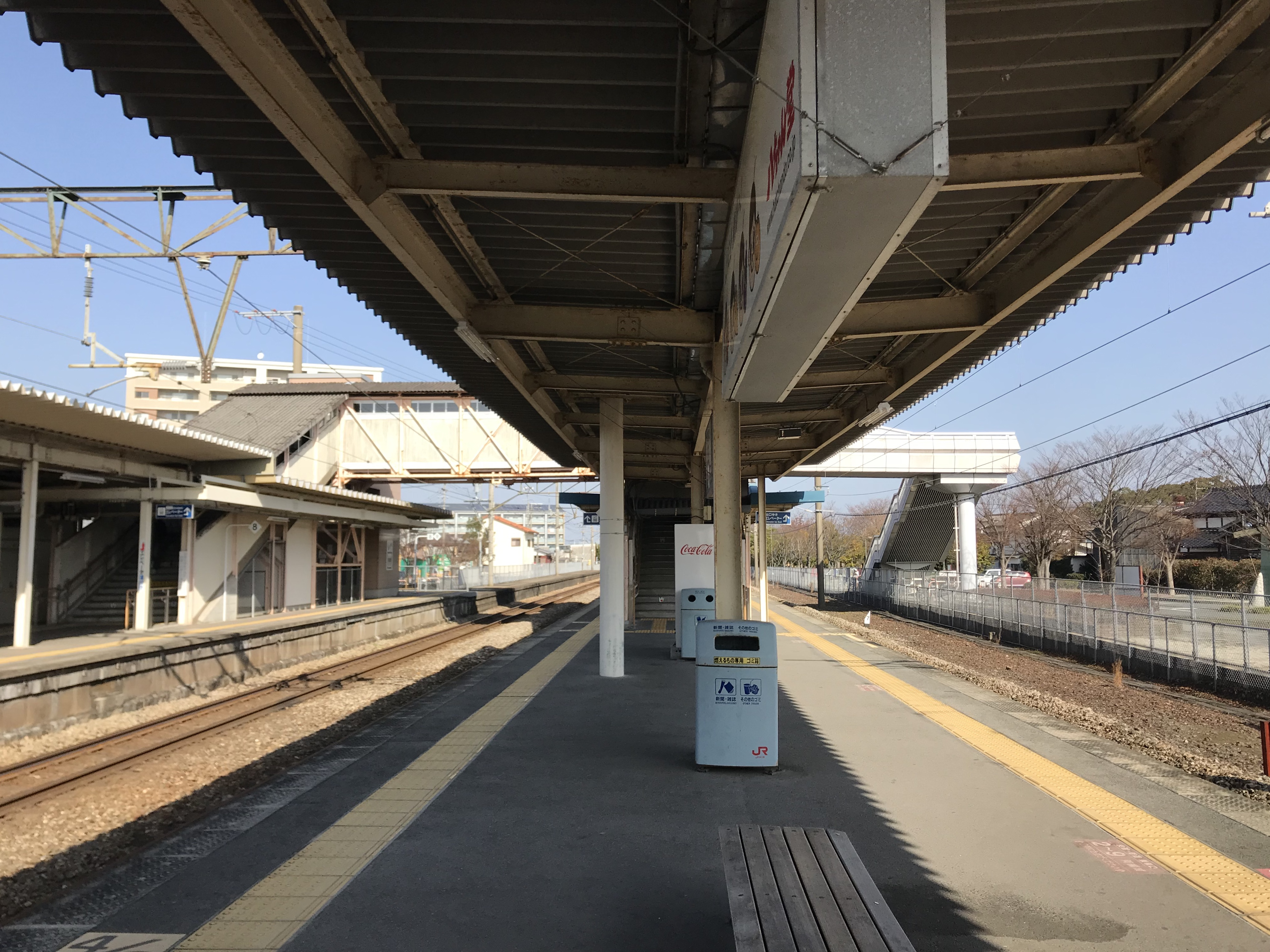
A view of the platforms and tracks.

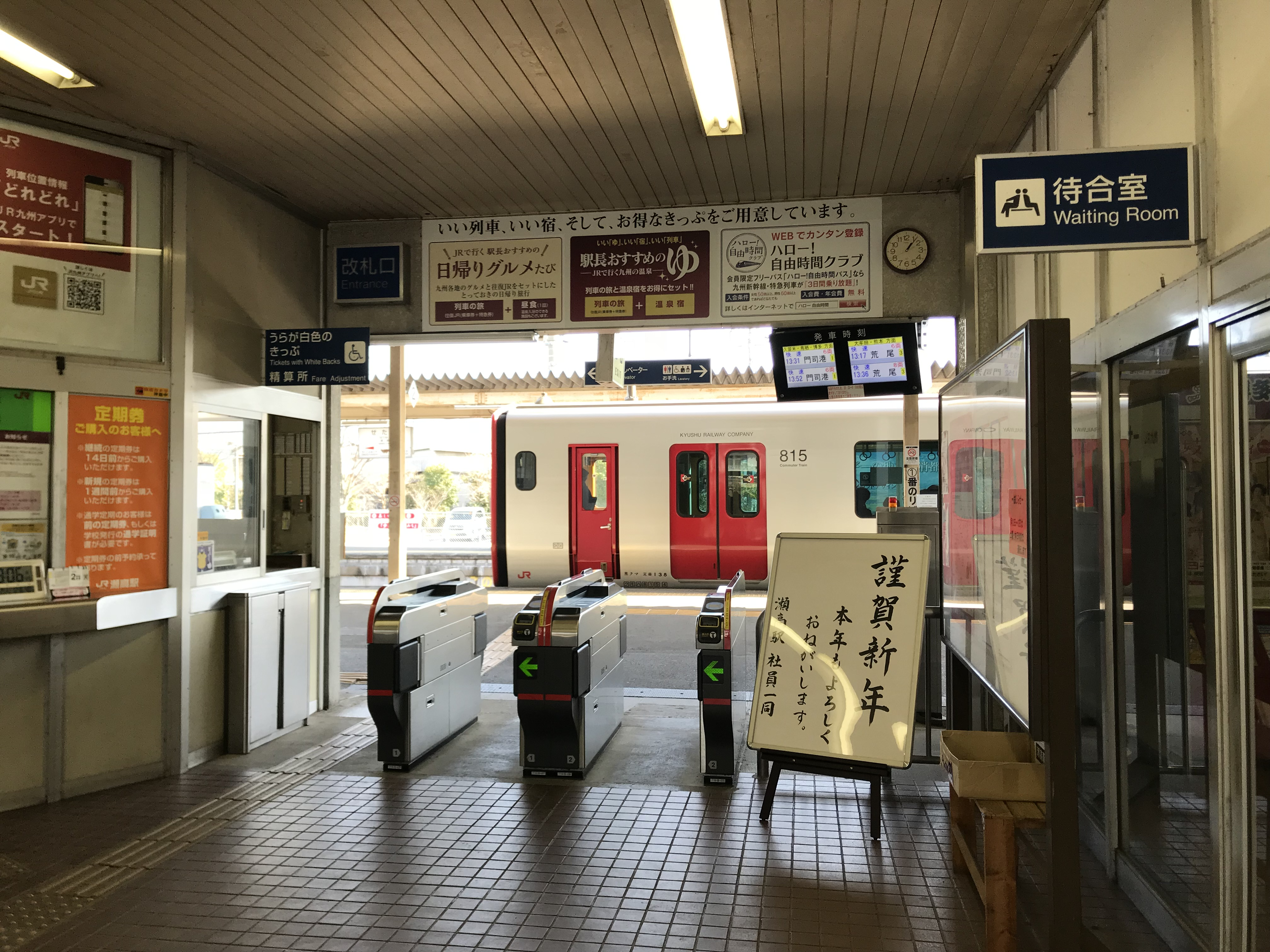
A view of the ticket gates.

== History ==
The privately run Kyushu Railway had opened a stretch of track between Hakata and the (now closed) Chitosegawa temporary stop on 11 December 1889. After several phases of expansion northwards and southwards, by February 1891, the line stretched from Kurosaki south to Kurume. In the next phase of expansion, the track was extended south to Takase (now Tamana) opening as the new southern terminus on 1 April 1891. Setaka, at that time named Yabegawa Station (矢部川駅), was opened on the same day as one of several intermediate stations on the new stretch of track. When the Kyushu Railway was nationalized on 1 July 1907, Japanese Government Railways (JGR) took over control of the station. On 12 October 1909, the station became part of the Hitoyoshi Main Line and then on 21 November 1909, part of the Kagoshima Main Line. On 1 April 1942, the station was renamed Setakamachi Station (瀬高駅町, Setaka-eki) and then on 10 April 1956, renamed Setaka. With the privatization of Japanese National Railways (JNR), the successor of JGR, on 1 April 1987, JR Kyushu took over control of the station.

== Passenger statistics ==
In fiscal 2020, the station was used by an average of 779 passengers daily (boarding passengers only), and it ranked 168th among the busiest stations of JR Kyushu.

== Surrounding area ==
- Miyama City Hall
- Japan National Route 209
- Japan National Route 443
- Kiyomizu-dera, Honbo Garden
- Zoyama Kogōshi

== See also ==
- List of railway stations in Japan
