= Shiotsuka Station =

Railway station in Yanagawa, Fukuoka Prefecture, Japan

Shiotsuka Station 塩塚駅
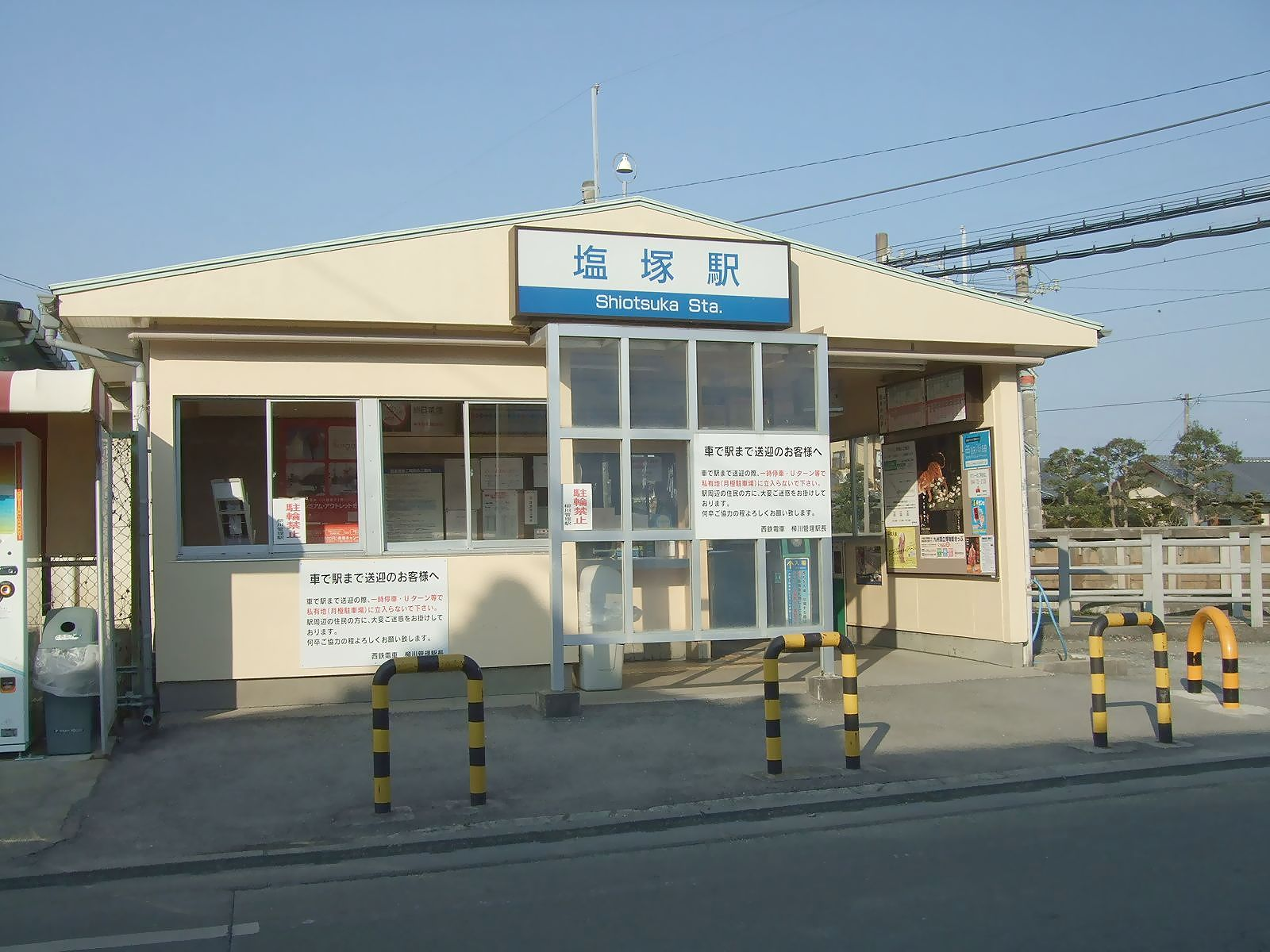
- Shiotsuka Station building

General information
- Location: Yamatomachi Shiotsuka, Yanagawa-shi, Fukuoka-ken 839-0243; Japan
- Coordinates: 33°8′36.25″N 130°25′52.22″E
- Operator: Nishi-Nippon Railroad
- Line: ■ Tenjin Ōmuta Line
- Distance: 61.1 km from Nishitetsu Fukuoka (Tenjin)
- Platforms: 1 island platform
- Connections

Other information
- Status: Unstaffed
- Station code: T41
- Website: Official website

History
- Opened: 1 September 1938

Passengers
- FY2022: 354

Services
Preceding station	Nishitetsu	Following station
Tokumasu towards Nishitetsu Fukuoka (Tenjin)	Tenjin Ōmuta Line Local	Nishitetsu Nakashima towards Ōmuta
Location
- Location within Fukuoka Prefecture Location within Japan

Shiotsuka Station (塩塚駅, Shiotsuka-eki) is a passenger railway station located in the city of Yanagawa, Fukuoka, Japan. It is operated by the private transportation company Nishi-Nippon Railroad (NNR), and has station number T41.

== Lines ==
The station is served by the Nishitetsu Tenjin Ōmuta Line and is 61.1 kilometers from the starting point of the line at Nishitetsu Fukuoka (Tenjin) Station.

== Station layout ==
The station consists of one island platform with a level crossing.

== Platforms ==
1	■ Tenjin Ōmuta Line	for Ōmuta
2	■ Tenjin Ōmuta Line	for Daizenji, Nishitetsu Kurume, Nishitetsu Futsukaichi, Fukuoka and Nishitetsu Yanagawa

== History ==
The station opened on 1 September 1938 on the Kyushu Railway. The company merged with the Kyushu Electric Tramway on 19 September 1942. The company changed its name to Nishi-Nippon Railway three days later, on 22 September 1942.

== Passenger statistics ==
In fiscal 2022, the station was used by 354 passengers daily.

== Surrounding area ==
- Toyohara Elementary School
- Toyohara Post Office
- Japan National Route 208

== See also ==
- List of railway stations in Japan
