= Ukiha District =

Former district in Fukuoka prefecture, Japan

Coordinates: 33.3207°N 130.7906°E

Ukiha (浮羽郡, Ukiha-gun) was a district located in Fukuoka Prefecture, Japan.

== Mergers ==
- On February 5, 2005 - the town of Tanushimaru, along with the town of Kitano (from Mii District), and the towns of Jōjima and Mizuma (both from Mizuma District), was merged into the expanded city of Kurume.
- On March 20, 2005 - the former town of Ukiha absorbed the town of Yoshii to create the city of Ukiha. Ukiha District was dissolved as a result of this merger.
