= Takashi Esaki =

Japanese politician (born 1956)

- 江﨑 孝
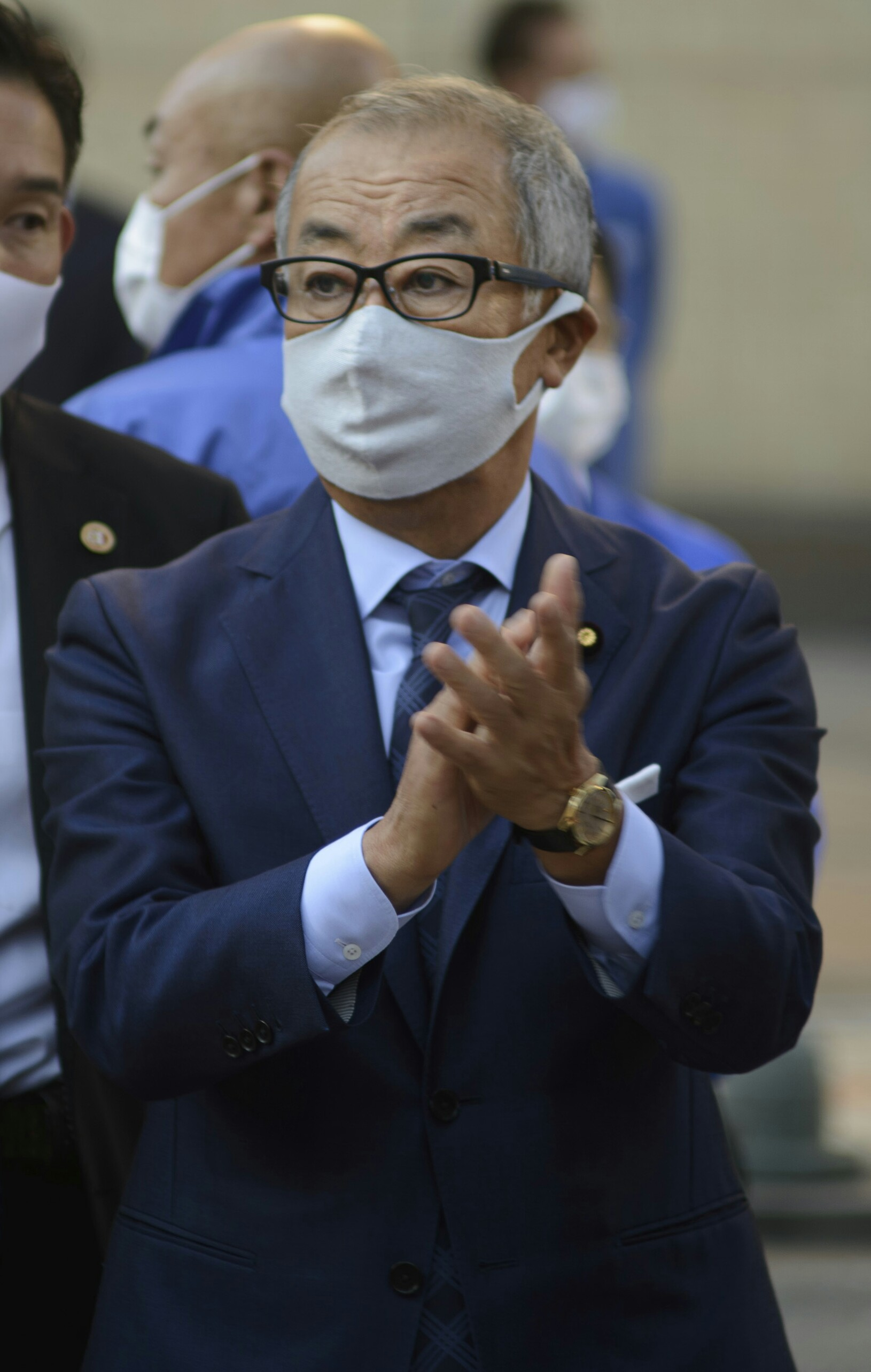
- Esaki in 2020

Member of the House of Councillors
- In office 26 July 2010 – 25 July 2022
- Constituency: National PR

Personal details
- Born: 11 August 1956 (age 70) Mitsuhashi, Fukuoka, Japan
- Party: CDP (since 2017)
- Other political affiliations: DPJ (2010–2016); DP (2016–2017)
- Education: Hosei University
- Website: http://esakitakashi.net/

Takashi Esaki (江崎孝, Esaki Takashi; born 11 August 1956) is a Japanese politician from the Constitutional Democratic Party of Japan. He serves as member of the House of Councillors as a national proportional representative.
