= Minami-Setaka Station =

Railway station in Miyama, Fukuoka Prefecture, Japan

JB 23 Minami-Setaka Station 南瀬高駅
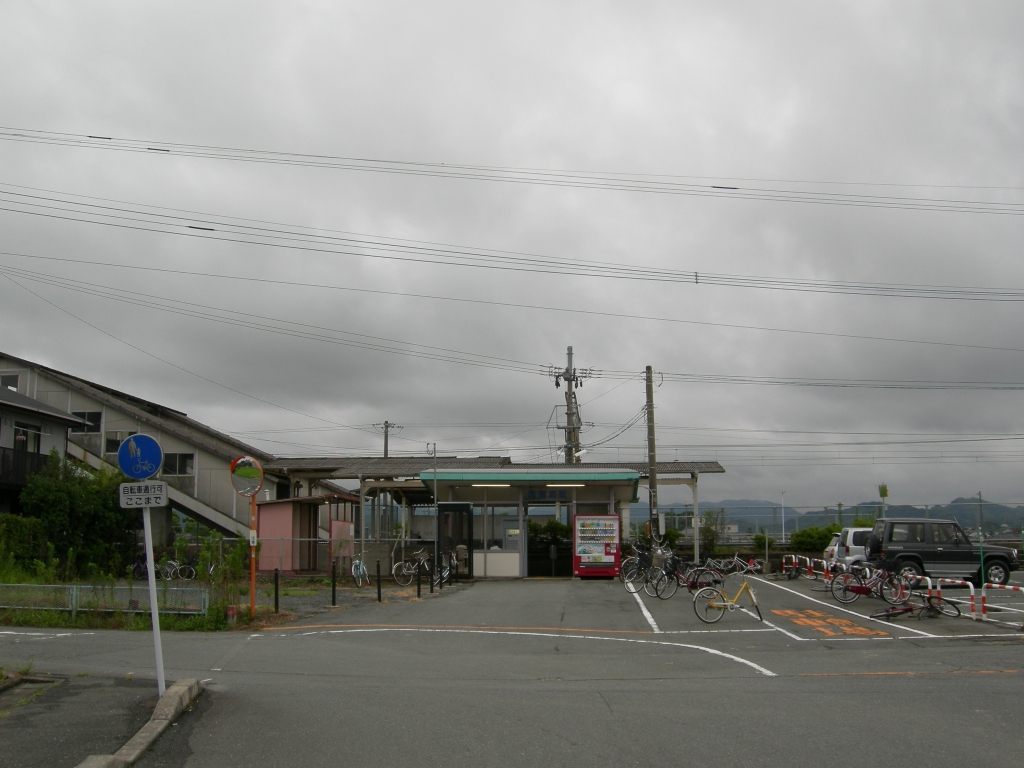
- Minami-Setaka Station in 2006

General information
- Location: Setakamachi Oga, Miyama-shi, Fukuoka-ken 835-0013; Japan
- Coordinates: 33°08′01″N 130°28′16″E
- Operator: JR Kyushu
- Line: JB Kagoshima Main Line
- Distance: 135.2 km from Mojikō
- Platforms: 2 side platforms
- Tracks: 2

Construction
- Structure type: At grade
- Parking: Available
- Cycle facilities: Designated parking area for bicycles
- Accessible: Yes - each platform accessible from its own side

Other information
- Status: Unstaffed
- Website: Official website

History
- Opened: 23 March 1935
- Former names: Idenoue (until 15 November 1942)

Passengers
- FY2018: 451 daily

Services
Preceding station	JR Kyushu	Following station
Wataze towards Kagoshima	Kagoshima Main Line	Setaka towards Mojikō
Location
- Location within Fukuoka Prefecture Location within Japan

Minami Setaka Station (南瀬高駅, Minami Setaka-eki) is a passenger railway station located in the city of Miyama, Fukuoka Prefecture, Japan. It is operated by JR Kyushu.

== Lines ==
The station is served by the Kagoshima Main Line and is located 135.2 km from the starting point of the line at Mojiko. Only local services on the line stop at the station.

== Layout ==
The station consists of two side platforms serving two tracks. The station building is a small, modern prefabricated structure which is unstaffed and serves only to house a waiting area and an automatic ticket vending machine. Sugoca card readers are also installed at the entrance to the platform. No steps are needed to enter the station and access platform 1. The platforms are linked by a footbridge but platform 2 has a separate entrance and ramp from the road on its own side. Sugoca card readers are also installed at this entrance.

=== Platforms ===
1	■ JB Kagoshima Main Line	for Kurume, Tosu and Hakata
2	■ JB Kagoshima Main Line	for Ōmuta, Kumamoto and Yatsushiro

== History ==
Japanese Government Railways (JGR) opened the station with the name Idenoue Station (井手ノ上駅) on 23 March 1935 as an additional station on the existing track of the Kagoshima Main Line. On 15 November 1942, the station name was changed to Minimi-Setaka. With the privatization of Japanese National Railways (JNR), the successor of JGR, on 1 April 1987, JR Kyushu took over control of the station.

== Surrounding area ==
- College of Health and Medical Management
- Japan National Route 209
- Miyama City Minami Elementary School

== See also ==
- List of railway stations in Japan
