= Enoura Station =

Railway station in Miyama, Fukuoka Prefecture, Japan

Enoura Station 江の浦駅
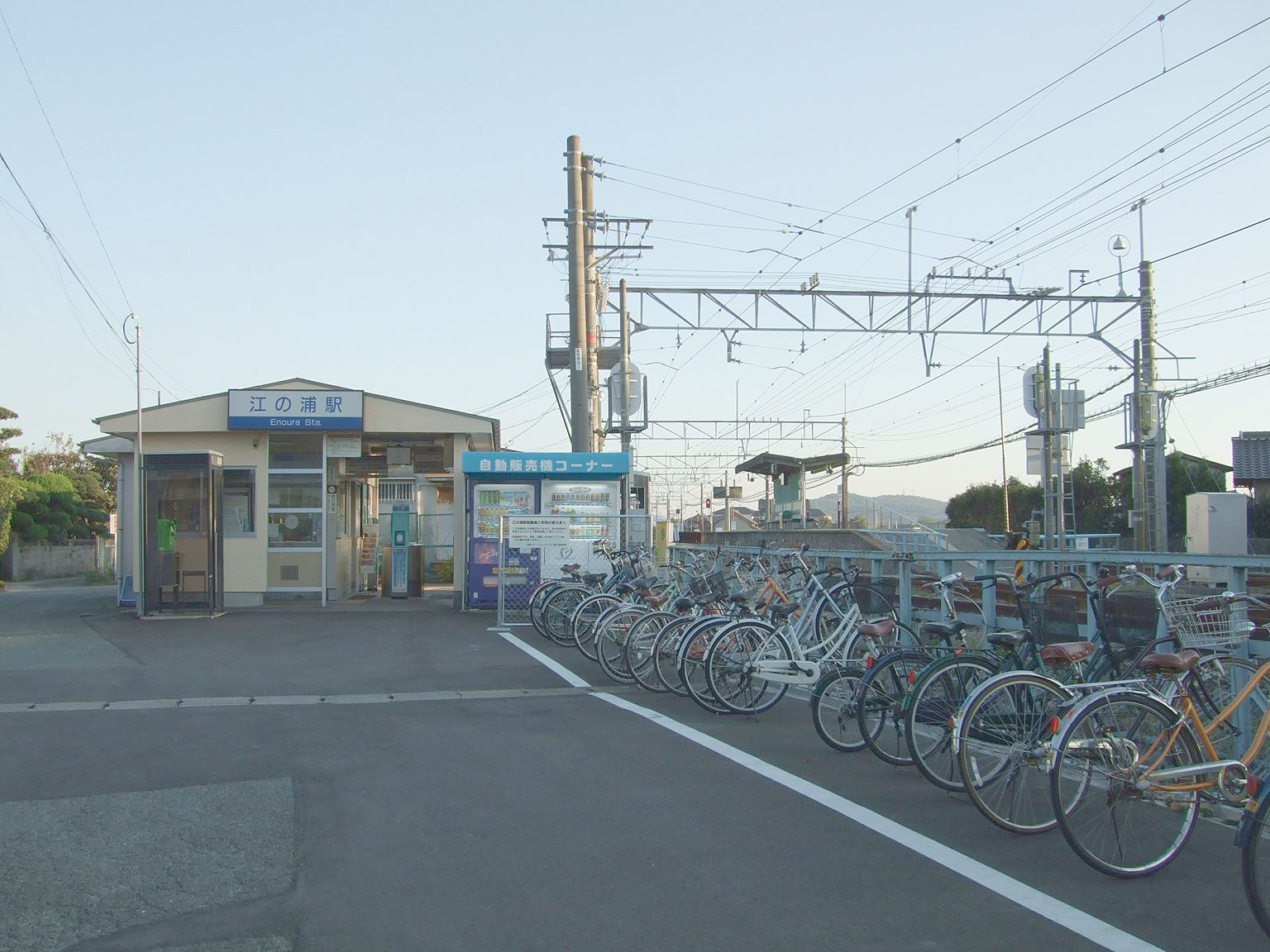
- Enoura Station building and platform

General information
- Location: Takatamachi Enoura, Miyama-shi, Fukuoka-ken 839-0213; Japan
- Coordinates: 33°6′35.04″N 130°26′47.13″E
- Operator: Nishi-Nippon Railroad
- Line: ■ Tenjin Ōmuta Line
- Distance: 65.1 km from Nishitetsu Fukuoka (Tenjin)
- Platforms: 1 island platform
- Connections

Other information
- Status: Unstaffed
- Station code: T43
- Website: Official website

History
- Opened: 1 October 1938

Passengers
- FY2022: 275

Services
| Preceding station | Nishitetsu | Following station |
|---|---|---|
| Nishitetsu Nakashima towards Nishitetsu Fukuoka (Tenjin) | Tenjin Ōmuta Line Local | Hiraki towards Ōmuta |
Location
- Location within Fukuoka Prefecture Location within Japan

Enoura Station (江の浦駅, Enoura-eki) is a passenger railway station located in the city of Miyama, Fukuoka, Japan. It is operated by the private transportation company Nishi-Nippon Railroad (NNR), and has station number T43.

== Lines ==
The station is served by the Nishitetsu Tenjin Ōmuta Line and is 65.1 kilometers from the starting point of the line at Nishitetsu Fukuoka (Tenjin) Station.

== Station layout ==
The station consists of one island platform connected by a level crossing.

== Platforms ==
| 1 | ■ Tenjin Ōmuta Line | for Ōmuta |
| 2 | ■ Tenjin Ōmuta Line | for Daizenji, Nishitetsu Kurume, Nishitetsu Futsukaichi, Fukuoka and Nishitetsu Yanagawa |

== History ==
The station opened on 1 October 1938. The company merged with the Kyushu Electric Tramway on 19 September 1942. The company changed its name to Nishi-Nippon Railway three days later, on 22 September 1942.

== Passenger statistics ==
In fiscal 2022, the station was used by 275 passengers daily.

== Surrounding area ==
- Enoura Elementary School
- Enoura Post Office
- Nishitetsu Techno Service
- Usahachiman Shrine
- Takada Interchange (Ariake Engan Road)
- Japan National Route 208

== See also ==
- List of railway stations in Japan
