= Tanushimaru, Fukuoka =

Dissolved municipality in Fukuoka prefecture, Japan

Tanushimaru (田主丸町, Tanushimaru-machi) was a town located in Ukiha District, Fukuoka Prefecture, Japan.

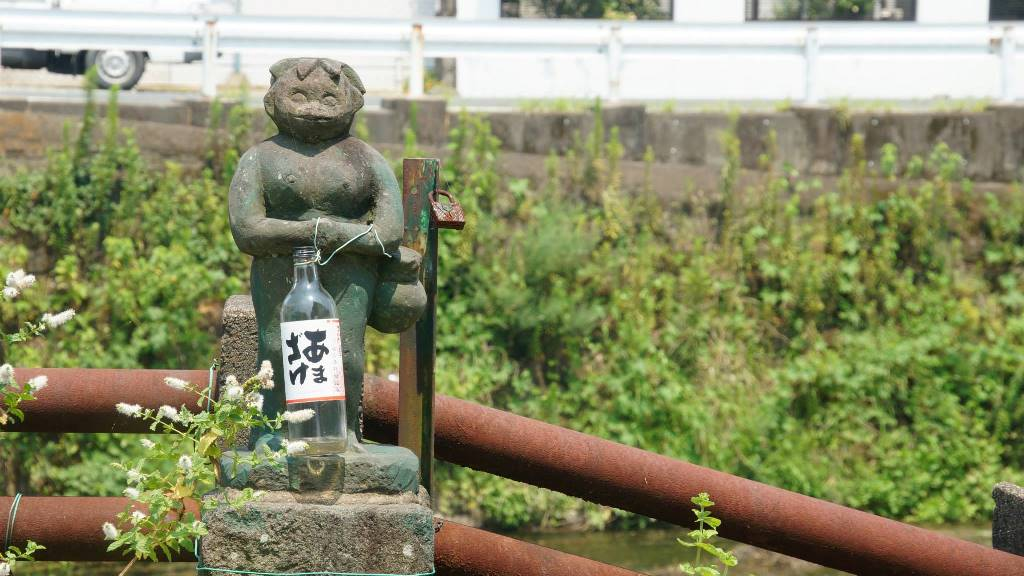
Kappa statue with Sake bottle..

== Population ==
As of 2003, the town had an estimated population of 21,204 and a density of 415.85 persons per km^{2}. The total area was 50.99 km^{2}.

== History ==
On February 5, 2005, Tanushimaru, along with the town of Kitano (from Mii District), and the towns of Jōjima and Mizuma (both from Mizuma District), was merged into the expanded city of Kurume and no longer exists as an independent municipality.

== Attractions ==
Tanushimaru was famous for its hot springs, the best being Mino Onsen, as well as its plant farming, unagi, and kappa. Legend has it that the nearby river is the origin of all Japanese kappa, and many monuments to the river monster can be seen around the town. Many of the local inhabitants offer cucumbers and sake to the kappa shrines.

There are also many grape fields, and grape picking is a popular tourist activity.

== Education ==
Tanushimaru is home to seven elementary schools, Mino, Mizuwake, Takeno, Shibakari, Tanushimaru, Kawaii, and Funagoshi, as well as Tanushimaru Middle School and Ukiha Technical High School.

== Links to other towns ==
Until recently Tanushimaru was classified as part of Ukiha-Gun. Close ties remain with the neighboring city of Ukiha, particularly with Yoshii town.
