= Mizuma, Fukuoka =

Dissolved municipality in Fukuoka prefecture, Japan

Mizuma (三潴町, Mizuma-machi) was a town located in Mizuma District, Fukuoka Prefecture, Japan.

As of 2003, the town had an estimated population of 15,606 and a density of 969.32 persons per km^{2}. The total area was 16.10 km^{2}.

On February 5, 2005, Mizuma, along with the town of Kitano (from Mii District), the town of Jōjima (also from Mizuma District), and the town of Tanushimaru (from Ukiha District), was merged into the expanded city of Kurume and no longer exists as an independent municipality.
