= Yanagawa, Fukuoka =

Yanagawa 柳川市
- City
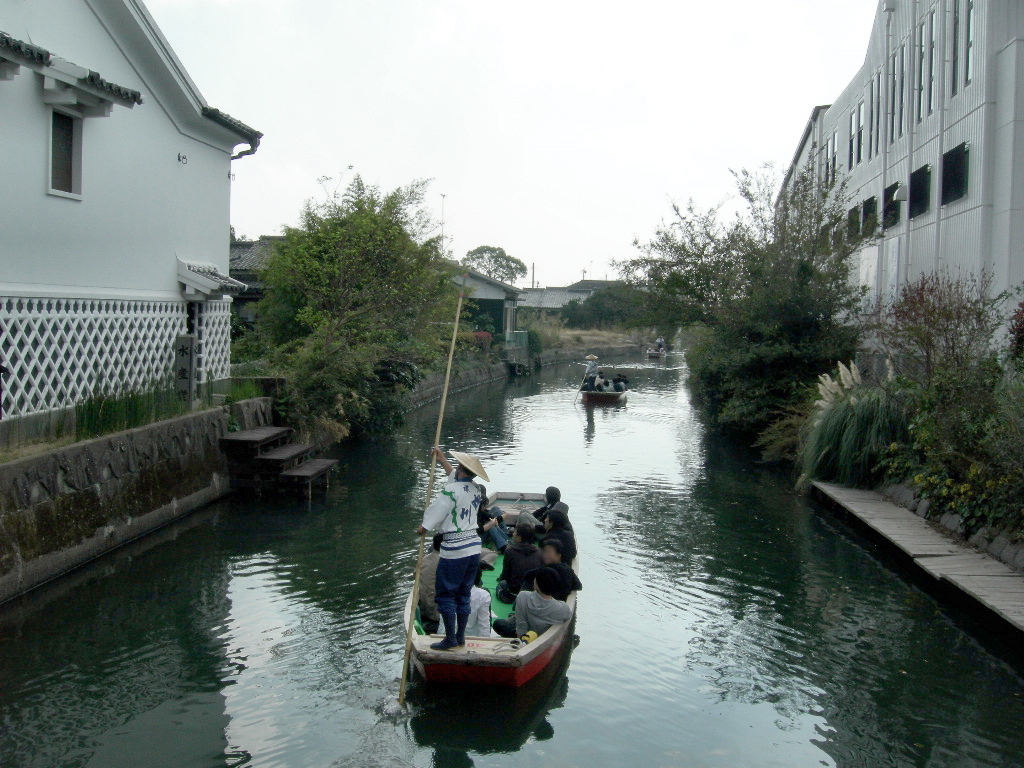
- Canal in Yanagawa, and as known for sightseeing spot in Kyushu

- Flag Seal
- Location of Yanagawa in Fukuoka Prefecture

- Location in Japan
- Coordinates: 33°09′47″N 130°24′21″E
- Country: Japan
- Region: Kyushu
- Prefecture: Fukuoka

Government
  - Mayor: Kenji Kaneko (since April 2009)

Area
  - Total: 77.15 km^{2} (29.79 sq mi)

Population (January 31, 2024)
  - Total: 62,268
  - Density: 807.1/km^{2} (2,090/sq mi)
- Time zone: UTC+09:00 (JST)
- City hall address: Honmachi 87-1, Yanagawa-shi, Fukuoka-ken 832-8601
- Website: Official website
- Symbols
- Flower: Wisteria, Iris
- Tree: Willow

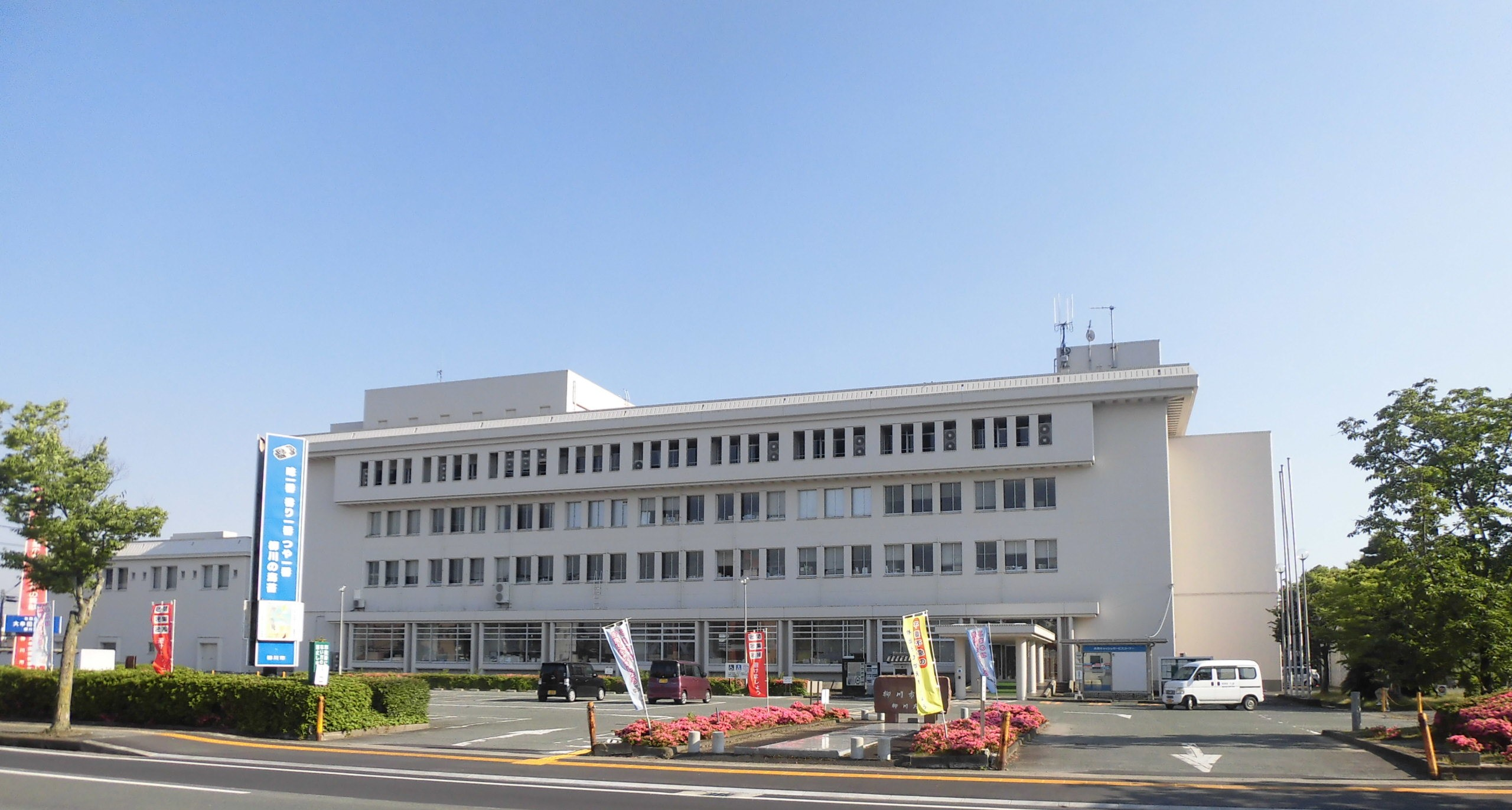
Yanagawa City Hall

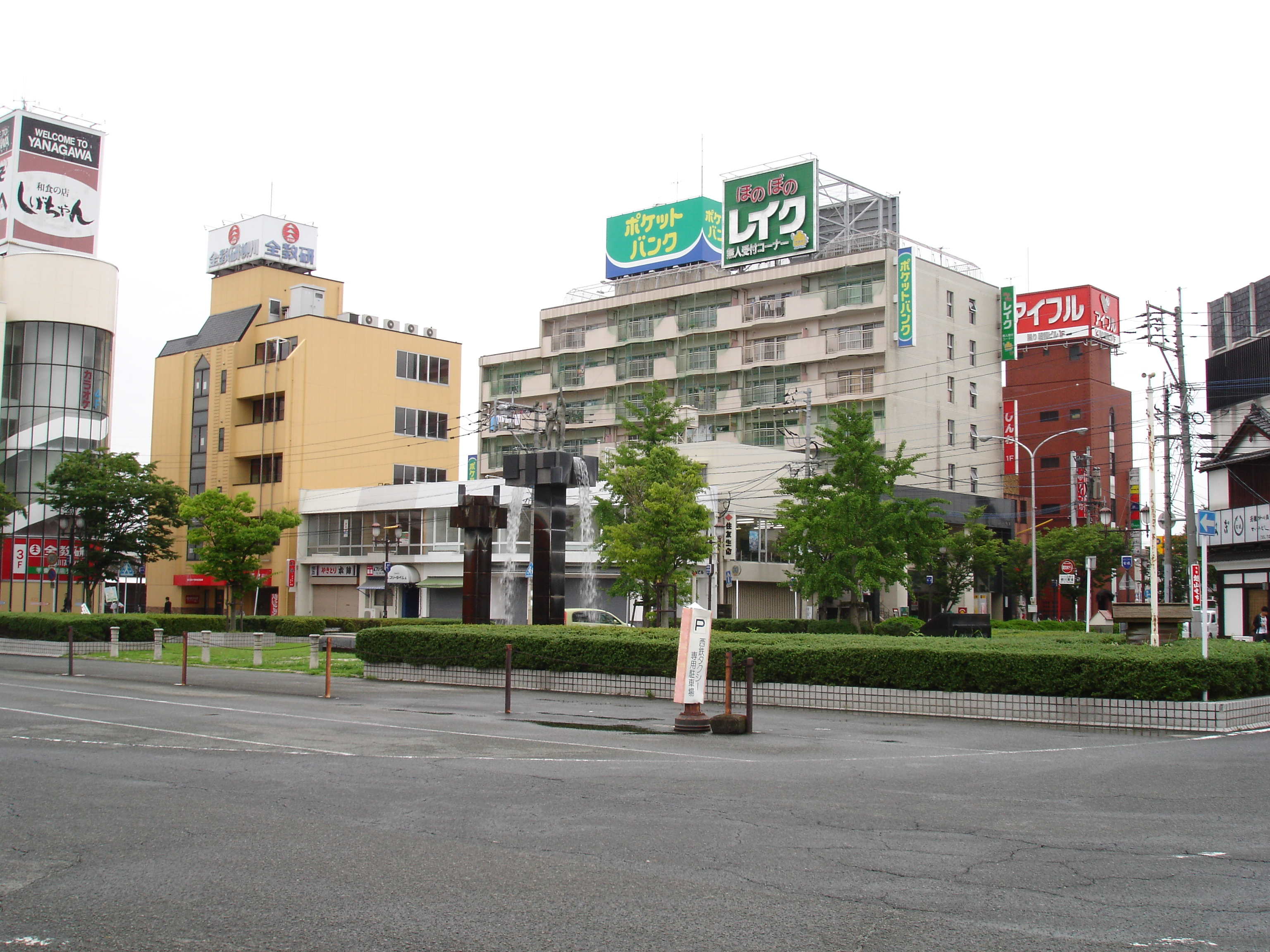
A view of Yanagawa city

Yanagawa (柳川市, Yanagawa-shi) is a city located in Fukuoka Prefecture, Japan. As of 31 January 2024, the city had an estimated population of 62,268 in 26426 households, and a population density of 810 persons per km^{2}. The total area of the city is 77.15 km^{2} (29.79 sq mi).

== Geography ==
Yanagawa is located in the southwestern part of the Chikugo region in the southern part of Fukuoka Prefecture, approximately 100 kilometers south-southwest of Kitakyushu City, approximately 50 kilometers south of Fukuoka City, approximately 20 kilometers southwest of Kurume City. The city is in the shape of a rhombus or diamond, measuring 12 kilometers from north-to-south and 11 kilometers from east-to-west.

Almost all of Yanagawa is in the flatlands of the Chikushi Plain, with the northeastern two-thirds of the city consisting of alluvial plains and the southwest one-third consisting of reclaimed land. The reclaimed land was gradually developed from the Edo period into the modern era, so the reclamation embankments and villages along the embankments from each era are lined up parallel to the coastline of the Ariake Sea.

=== Neighboring municipalities ===
Fukuoka Prefecture

- Chikugo
- Miyama
- Ōkawa
- Ōki

Saga Prefecture

- Saga

=== Climate ===
Yanagawa has a humid subtropical climate (Köppen Cfa) characterized by warm summers and cool winters with light to no snowfall. The average annual temperature in Yanagawa is 16.3 °C. The average annual rainfall is 1946 mm with September as the wettest month. The temperatures are highest on average in August, at around 27.1 °C, and lowest in January, at around 6.0 °C.

=== Demographics ===
Per Japanese census data, the population of Yanagawa is as shown below

Historical population
Year	Pop.	±%
1940	67,416	—
1950	83,512	+23.9%
1960	86,888	+4.0%
1970	82,263	−5.3%
1980	82,185	−0.1%
1990	80,531	−2.0%
2000	77,612	−3.6%
2010	71,388	−8.0%
2020	64,475	−9.7%

== History ==
The area of Yanagawa was part of ancient Chikugo Province. Yayoi pottery dating back approximately 2,000 years ago was excavated in the Kamachi area on the outskirts of Yanagawa, and it is estimated that rice cultivation began in this area around that time. During the Heian period, Yanagawa was a stronghold of the Tachibana clan against Fujiwara no Sumitomo's Revolt. Yanagawa was reborn as a castle town of the Kamachi clan during the Sengoku period during the 16th century, and became the castle town of Yanagawa Domain under the Tachibana clan during the Edo period.

After the Meiji restoration, the town of Yanagawa (柳河町) was established on May 1, 1889, with the creation of the modern municipalities system. On 1 April 1951 Yanagawa annexed the neighboring villages of Higashimiyaga, Nishinomiyaga, Jonai, Okibata, and Ryokai and changed the kanji of its name to "柳川町". Yanagawa was raised to city status on 1 April 1952. On 21 March 2005, the towns of Yamato and Mitsuhashi (both from Yamato District) were merged into Yanagawa.

== Government ==
Yanagawa has a mayor-council form of government with a directly elected mayor and a unicameral city council of 19 members. Yanagawa contributes one member to the Fukuoka Prefectural Assembly. In terms of national politics, the city is part of the Fukuoka 7th district of the lower house of the Diet of Japan.

== Economy ==
Yanagawa has a mixed economy, centered on commercial fishing, especially for unagi or Japanese freshwater eel, agriculture, as well as manufacturing focused on semiconductors and woodworks. The city is also known for a thriving tourism industry.

== Education ==
Yanagawa has 19 public elementary schools and six public junior high schools operated by the city government and one public high school operated by the Fukuoka Prefectural Board of Education. There are also two private high schools, and Fukuoka Prefecture also operates one special education school for the handicapped.

== Transportation ==
=== Railways ===
Nishitetsu Tenjin Ōmuta Line

- Kamachi - Yakabe - Nishitetsu Yanagawa - Tokumasu - Shiotsuka - Nishitetsu Nakashima

=== Highways ===
- National Route 208
- National Route 385
- National Route 443

== Sister cities ==
- Steenwijkerland, Netherlands

== Local attractions ==
Yanagawa is popular with Japanese tourists because of its 470 km of wide canals (930 km inclusive of all watercourses). Yanagawa riverboats, called "donkobune", are used to take tourists around the city. In 1987 a video documentary was created by Studio Ghibli about these canals and their restoration. The Story of Yanagawa's Canals (柳川掘割物語, Yanagawa horiwari monogatari) is widely available and includes English subtitles.

Yanagawa is the birthplace of Kitahara Hakushu, a Meiji era poet and writer of children's songs. An annual three-day festival is held every November in Yanagawa complete with poetry readings, fireworks, music, and a great number of evening boat rides. During this festival, most activities begin from Shimohyaku Town and center at the Hiyoshi Shinto Shrine. In addition, Hakushu's birth house is located in Yanagawa and open to the public for tours. The Yanagawa Municipal Folk Museum is mainly dedicated to preservation of Hakushu-sensei's works and memorabilia.

During the months of March and April, Yanagawa also plays host to a number of festivals, most notably Hinamatsuri or Girls' Festival on March 3. A great number of finely crafted Heian era styled dolls are placed on display in a number of private homes, shops, and businesses throughout the city. During this time, a number of local citizens actually open up their homes to the public, allowing people to come and see their elaborate decorations and displays.

== Notable residents of Yanagawa ==
- Kazuo Dan, novelist
- Ebina Danjo, educator and philosopher
- Kitahara Hakushu, poet
- Unryū Kyūkichi, sumo wrestler
- Iwata Nakayama, photographer
- Tomishige Rihei, photographer
- Hideaki Tokunaga, singer-songwriter
- Satoshi Tsumabuki, actor
