= Nishitetsu Nakashima Station =

Railway station in Yanagawa, Fukuoka Prefecture, Japan

Nishitetsu Nakashima Station 西鉄中島駅
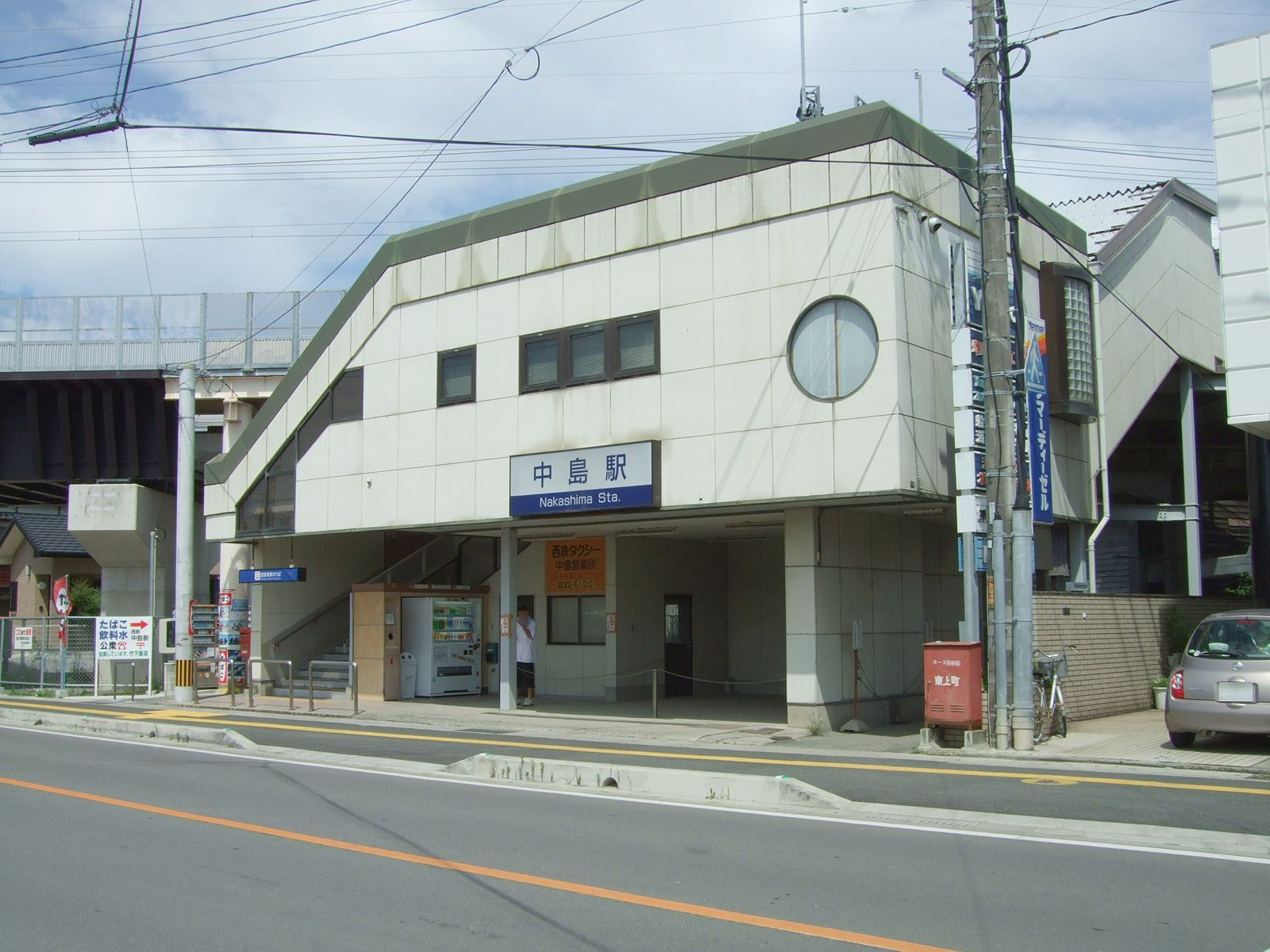
- Nakashima Station building

General information
- Location: Yamatomachi Nakashima, Yanagawa-shi, Fukuoka-ken 839-0254; Japan
- Coordinates: 33°7′21.77″N 130°26′24.03″E
- Operator: Nishi-Nippon Railroad
- Line: ■ Tenjin Ōmuta Line
- Distance: 63.5 km from Nishitetsu Fukuoka (Tenjin)
- Platforms: 1 side platform
- Connections

Other information
- Status: Unstaffed
- Station code: T42
- Website: Official website

History
- Opened: 1 October 1938
- Former names: Nakashima (to 1939); Kyutetsu Nakashima (to 1942)

Passengers
- FY2022: 782

Services
Preceding station	Nishitetsu	Following station
Shiotsuka towards Nishitetsu Fukuoka (Tenjin)	Tenjin Ōmuta Line Local	Enoura towards Ōmuta
Location
- Location within Fukuoka Prefecture Location within Japan

Nishitetsu Nakashima Station (西鉄中島駅, Nakashima-eki) is a passenger railway station located in the city of Yanagawa, Fukuoka, Japan. It is operated by the private transportation company Nishi-Nippon Railroad (NNR), and has station number T42.

== Lines ==
The station is served by the Nishitetsu Tenjin Ōmuta Line and is 63.5 kilometers from the starting point of the line at Nishitetsu Fukuoka (Tenjin) Station.

== Station layout ==
The station consists of one elevated side platform with the station underneath. The station is unattended.

== Platforms ==
1	■ Tenjin Ōmuta Line	for Daizenji, Nishitetsu Kurume, Nishitetsu Futsukaichi, Fukuoka, Nishitetsu Yanagawa and Ōmuta

== History ==
The station opened on 1 October 1938 as Nakashima Station (中島駅) on the Kyushu Railway. The station name was changed to Kyutetsu Nakashima Station (九鉄中島駅) on 1 July 1939. The company merged with the Kyushu Electric Tramway on 19 September 1942. The company changed its name to Nishi-Nippon Railway three days later, on 22 September 1942 and the station was renamed to its present name.

== Passenger statistics ==
In fiscal 2022, the station was used by 782 passengers daily.

== Surrounding area ==
- Nakashima Elementary School
- Nakashima Shopping District
- Nakashima Post Office
- Nakashima Port

== See also ==
- List of railway stations in Japan
