= Setaka, Fukuoka =

Dissolved municipality in Fukuoka prefecture, Japan

Setaka (瀬高町, Setaka-machi) was a town located in Yamato District, Fukuoka Prefecture, Japan.

== Population ==
As of 2003, the town had an estimated population of 24,221 and a density of 641.96 persons per km^{2}. The total area was 37.73 km^{2}.

== History ==
On January 29, 2007, Setaka, along with the town of Yamakawa (also from the Yamato District), and the town of Takata (from the Miike District), were merged to create the city of Miyama.

In 2006, the Setaka Town Assembly proposed inviting universities to consider establishing a campus in the town and asked for comments from the town's residents. One group of residents submitted a deposition asking that only universities that did not allow foreign student enrollment be allowed to open a campus in Setaka. The deposition was accepted by the town assembly without debate.

== Notable Person from Setaka ==
- Jun'ichi Yoda - poet
- Makoto Koga - politician
