= College of Healthcare Management =

Private university in Fukuoka, Japan

Coordinates: 33°08′28″N 130°27′34″E

College of Healthcare Management (保健医療経営大学, Hoken iryou keiei daigaku) is a private university in Miyama, Fukuoka, Japan. The school was established in 2008. It was closed in March 2023.
