= Nishitetsu Wataze Station =

Railway station in Ōmuta, Fukuoka Prefecture, Japan

Nishitetsu Wataze Station 西鉄渡瀬駅
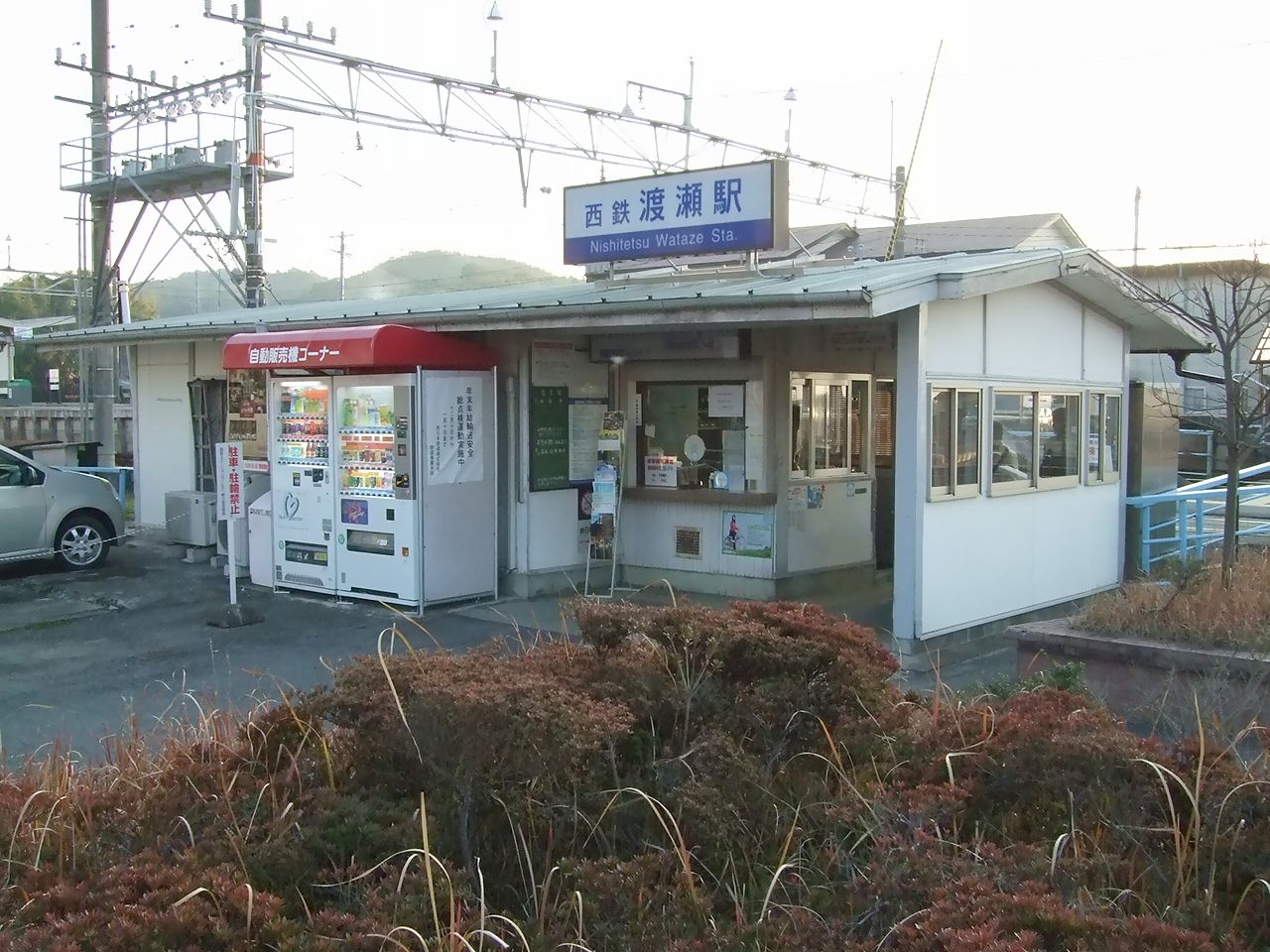
- Wataze Station building

General information
- Location: Kuranaga, Ōmuta-shi, Fukuoka-ken 837-0906; Japan
- Coordinates: 33°5′14″N 130°27′31.1″E
- Operator: Nishi-Nippon Railroad
- Line: ■ Tenjin Ōmuta Line
- Distance: 67.9 km from Nishitetsu Fukuoka (Tenjin)
- Platforms: 2 island platforms
- Connections

Other information
- Status: Unstaffed
- Station code: T45
- Website: Official website

History
- Opened: 1 October 1938
- Former names: Wataze (to 1939); Kyutetsu Wataze (to 1942)

Passengers
- FY2022: 314

Services
Preceding station	Nishitetsu	Following station
Hiraki towards Nishitetsu Fukuoka (Tenjin)	Tenjin Ōmuta Line Local	Kuranaga towards Ōmuta
Location
- Location within Fukuoka Prefecture Location within Japan

Nishitetsu Wataze Station (西鉄渡瀬駅, Nishitetsu-Wataze-eki) is a passenger railway station located in the city of Ōmuta, Fukuoka, Japan. It is operated by the private transportation company Nishi-Nippon Railroad (NNR), and has station number T45.

== Lines ==
The station is served by the Nishitetsu Tenjin Ōmuta Line and is 67.9 kilometers from the starting point of the line at Nishitetsu Fukuoka (Tenjin) Station.

== Station layout ==
The station consists of two island platforms connected by a level crossing.

== Platforms ==
1 2	■ Tenjin Ōmuta Line	for Ōmuta
3 4	■ Tenjin Ōmuta Line	for Daizenji, Nishitetsu Kurume, Nishitetsu Futsukaichi, Fukuoka and Nishitetsu Yanagawa

== History ==
The station opened on 1 October 1938 as Wataze Station (渡瀬駅). The station name was changed to Kyutetsu Wataze Station (九鉄渡瀬駅) on 1 July 1939. The company merged with the Kyushu Electric Tramway on 19 September 1942. The company changed its name to Nishi-Nippon Railway three days later, on 22 September 1942 and the station was renamed Nishitetsu Wataze Station (西鉄渡瀬駅) .

== Passenger statistics ==
In fiscal 2022, the station was used by 314 passengers daily.

== Surrounding area ==
- Ichibayamashita Post Office
- Japan National Route 208

== See also ==
- List of railway stations in Japan
