= Jun'ichi Yoda =

Japanese poet

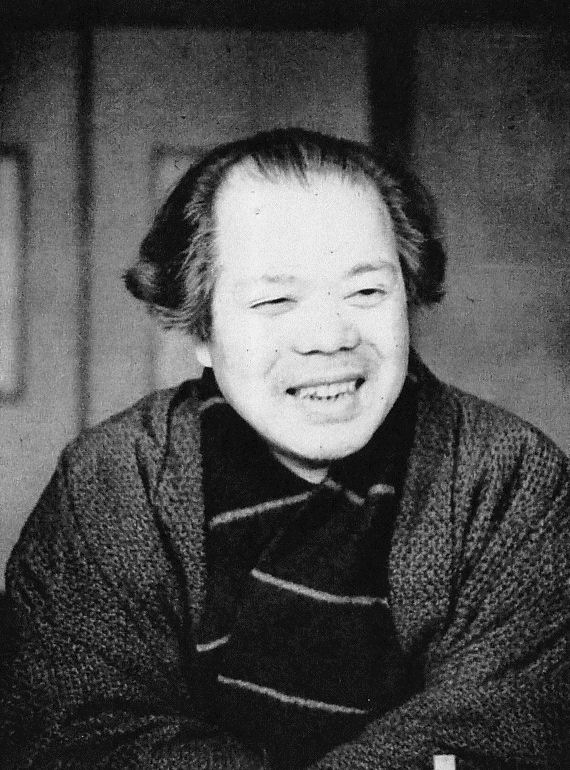
Junichi Yoda

Junichi Yoda (与田凖一, Yoda Jun'ichi; June 25, 1905 in Fukuoka – February 3, 1997) was a Japanese poet and a leading figure among Japanese authors of children's books during the Shōwa period.

== Early life ==
Junichi Yoda was born in 1905 in Setaka (now Miyama), Fukuoka, the second son of Yotarō Asayama and Sue, and was adopted as the heir of the Yodas, relatives of the Asayamas.

== Literary career ==
While teaching at elementary schools in Chikugo, Yoda studied under Kitahara Hakushū. Then he went to Tokyo and became an editor of Akai Tori (Red Bird), an influential children's literature magazine which Miekichi Suzuki published and where Nankichi Niimi was active at that time. In 1929, Yoda published his first book for children, Flag, Bee, and Cloud (「旗・蜂・雲」).

From 1950 to 1960 Yoda gave lectures on children's literature at Japan Women's University. In 1962 he became the chairman of the Japanese Association of Writers for Children. He was awarded the Sankei Juvenile Literature Publishing Culture Award for the Complete Works of Junichi Yoda (「与田凖一全集」) in 1967 and the Noma Juvenile Literature Prize for Noyuki Yamayuki (「野ゆき山ゆき」) in 1973. Michio Mado and Kimiko Aman were his pupils.

== Works ==
- "A Goat and a Dish" 「山羊とお皿」
- "12 Stumps" 「十二の切株」
- "Bippu and the Town Mayor" 「びっぷとちょうちょう」
- "A Song of Playing with a Ball Hitting with the Hand" 「てまりのうた」
- "The Complete Works of Junichi Yoda" 「与田凖一全集」
