= Miyama, Fukuoka =

Miyama みやま市
- City
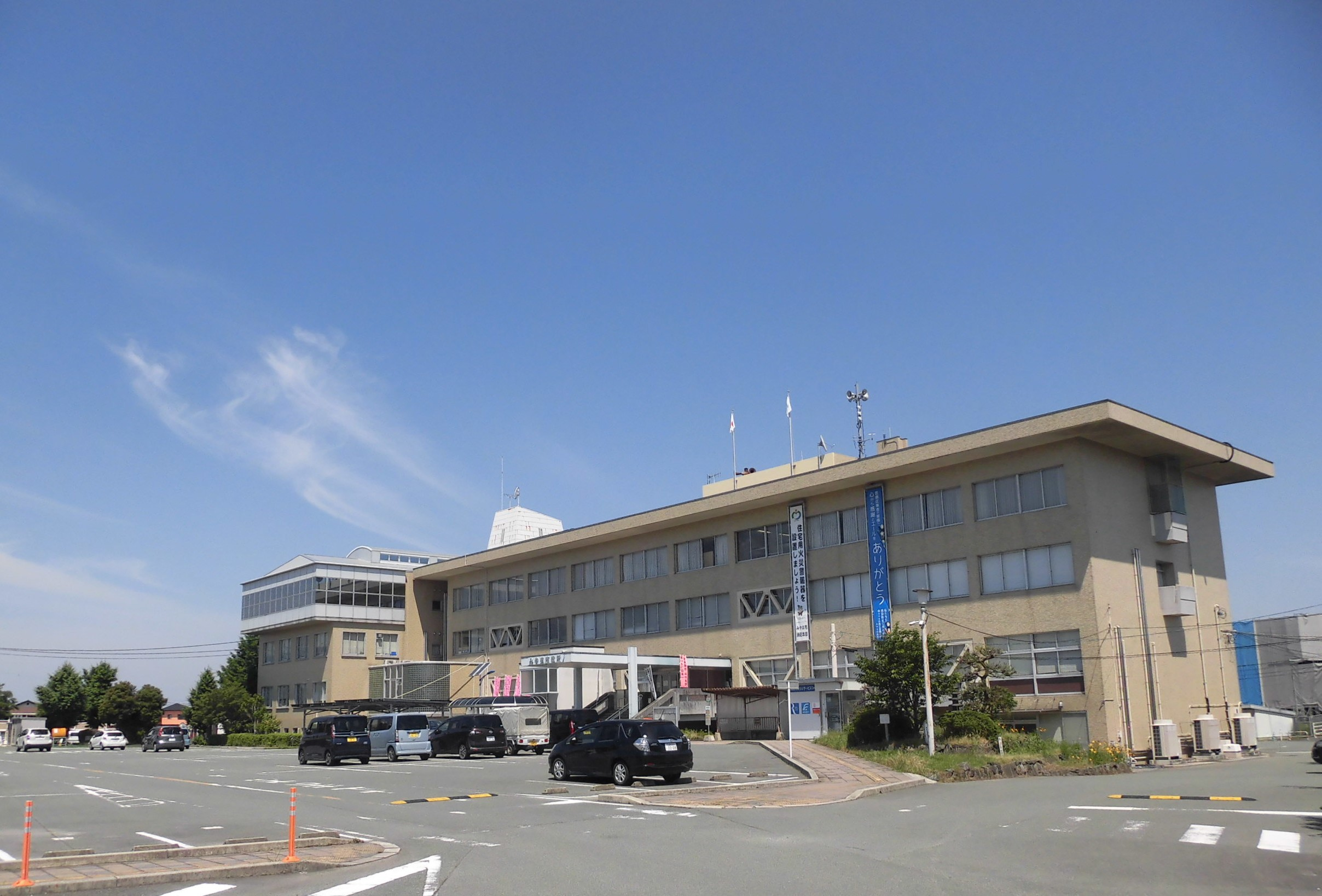
- Miyama City Hall

- Flag Emblem
- Interactive map of Miyama
- Location in Japan
- Coordinates: 33°9′9″N 130°28′29″E
- Country: Japan
- Region: Kyushu
- Prefecture: Fukuoka
- Setaka town settled: January 19, 1907
- Three towns merged and city settled: January 29, 2007

Government
  - Mayor: Masahiro Yoshihara (吉原政宏) - from October 2026

Area
  - Total: 105.21 km^{2} (40.62 sq mi)

Population (December 31, 2023)
  - Total: 34,907
  - Density: 331.78/km^{2} (859.32/sq mi)
- Time zone: UTC+09:00 (JST)
- City hall address: 5 Ogawa, Setaka-cho, Miyama-shi, Fukuoka-ken 835-8601
- Website: Official website
- Symbols
- Flower: Sakura
- Tree: Kusunoki

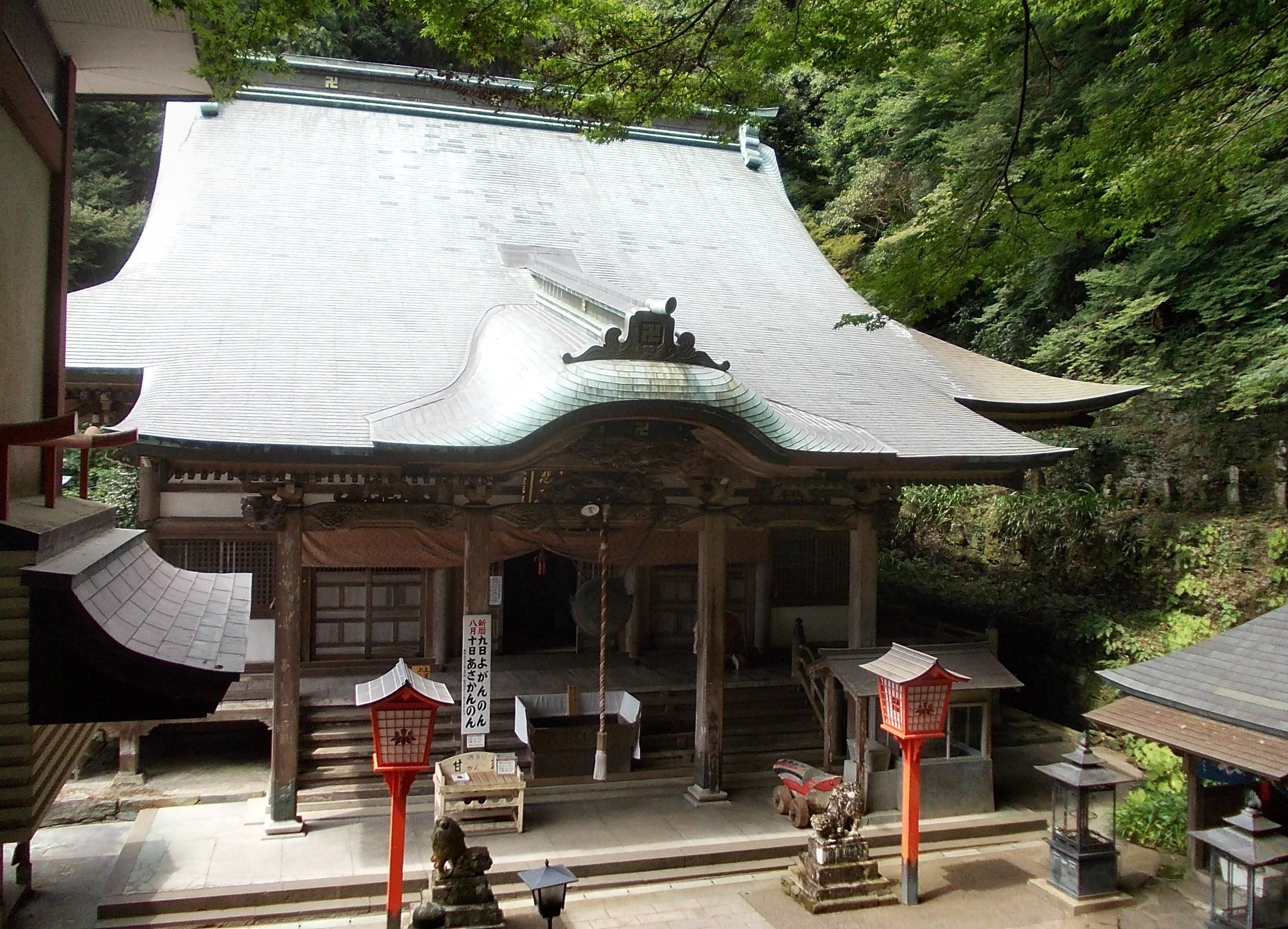
Kiyomizu-dera Main Hall

Miyama (みやま市, Miyama-shi) is a city located in Fukuoka Prefecture, Japan. As of 31 December 2023, the city had an estimated population of 34,907 in 14658 households, and a population density of 330 persons per km^{2}. The total area of the city is 105.21 km^{2} (40.62 sq mi).

== Geography ==
Miyama is located in southern Fukuoka Prefecture, about 100 kilometers south of Kitakyushu City, about 50 kilometers south of Fukuoka City, and about 20 kilometers south of Kurume City. Yanagawa City and Chikugo City lie across the Yabe River, a first-class river. Much of the city area is flat land included in the Chikushi Plain (Chikugo Plain), and the southwestern part of the city faces the Ariake Sea.

=== Neighboring municipalities ===
Fukuoka Prefecture

- Chikugo
- Ōmuta
- Yame
- Yanagawa

Kumamoto Prefecture

- Nagomi
- Nankan

=== Climate ===
Miyama has a humid subtropical climate (Köppen Cfa) characterized by warm summers and cool winters with light to no snowfall. The average annual temperature in Miyama is 15.8 °C. The average annual rainfall is 1946 mm with September as the wettest month. The temperatures are highest on average in August, at around 26.7 °C, and lowest in January, at around 5.3 °C.

=== Demographics ===
Per Japanese census data, the population of Miyama is as shown below

Historical population
Year	Pop.	±%
1940	44,627	—
1950	59,052	+32.3%
1960	58,074	−1.7%
1970	53,945	−7.1%
1980	52,232	−3.2%
1990	51,000	−2.4%
2000	46,892	−8.1%
2010	41,994	−10.4%
2020	35,861	−14.6%

== History ==
The area of Miyama was part of ancient Chikugo Province. Per the Nihon Shoki Empress Jingu is said to have defeated Tsuchigumo queen Taburatsuhime (田油津媛) in this area, which has many kofun burial mounds from the Kofun period. During the Edo Period, the area was part of Yanagawa Domain under the Tachibana clan. After the Meiji restoration, the town of Kamisetaka (上瀬高町) was established on May 1, 1889 in Yamato District with the creation of the modern municipalities system. It was renamed Setaka on January 1, 1901. On January 29, 2007, Setaka merged with the villages of Yamakawa and Takata (from Miike District) and became the city of Miyama.

== Government ==
Miyama has a mayor-council form of government with a directly elected mayor and a unicameral city council of 16 members. Miyama contributes one member to the Fukuoka Prefectural Assembly. In terms of national politics, the city is part of the Fukuoka 7th district of the lower house of the Diet of Japan.

== Economy ==
The economy of Miyama is overwhelmingly agricultural. Eggplants and celery are noted local products

== Education ==
Miyama has 11 public elementary schools and four public junior high schools operated by the city government and one public high school operated by the Fukuoka Prefectural Board of Education. The College of Healthcare Management was formerly located in Miyama, but closed in 2023.

== Transportation ==
=== Railways ===
JR Kyushu - Kagoshima Main Line

JB Setaka - Minami-Setaka - Wataze

Nishitetsu Tenjin Ōmuta Line

- Enoura - Hiraki

=== Highways ===
- Kyushu Expressway
- National Route 208
- National Route 209
- National Route 443

== Local attractions ==
- Kiyomizu-dera (Miyama, Fukuoka)
- Sekijinsan Kofun, National Historic Site
- Zoyama Kogōishi, National Historic Site

== Notable residents of Miyama ==
- Seiichi Itō, admiral in the Imperial Japanese Navy
- Makoto Koga, politician
- Noda Utarō, entrepreneur, politician and cabinet minister in the pre-World War II Japan
- Jun'ichi Yoda, poet and author of children's books
