= Kitano, Fukuoka =

Dissolved municipality in Fukuoka prefecture, Japan

Kitano (北野町, Kitano-machi) was a town located in Mii District, Fukuoka Prefecture, Japan.

As of 2003, the town had an estimated population of 17,263 and a density of 842.51 persons per km^{2}. The total area was 20.49 km^{2}.

On February 5, 2005, Kitano, along with the towns of Jōjima and Mizuma (both from Mizuma District), and the town of Tanushimaru (from Ukiha District), was merged into the expanded city of Kurume and no longer exists as an independent municipality.
