= Jōjima, Fukuoka =

Dissolved municipality in Mizuma district, Fukuoka prefecture, Japan

Jōjima (城島町, Jōjima-machi) was a town located in Mizuma District, Fukuoka Prefecture, Japan. As of 2003, the town had an estimated population of 13,772 and a density of 783.39 persons per km^{2}. The total area was 17.58 km^{2}.

On February 5, 2005, Jōjima, along with the town of Kitano (from Mii District), the town of Mizuma (also from Mizuma District), and the town of Tanushimaru (from Ukiha District), was merged into the expanded city of Kurume and no longer exists as an independent municipality.

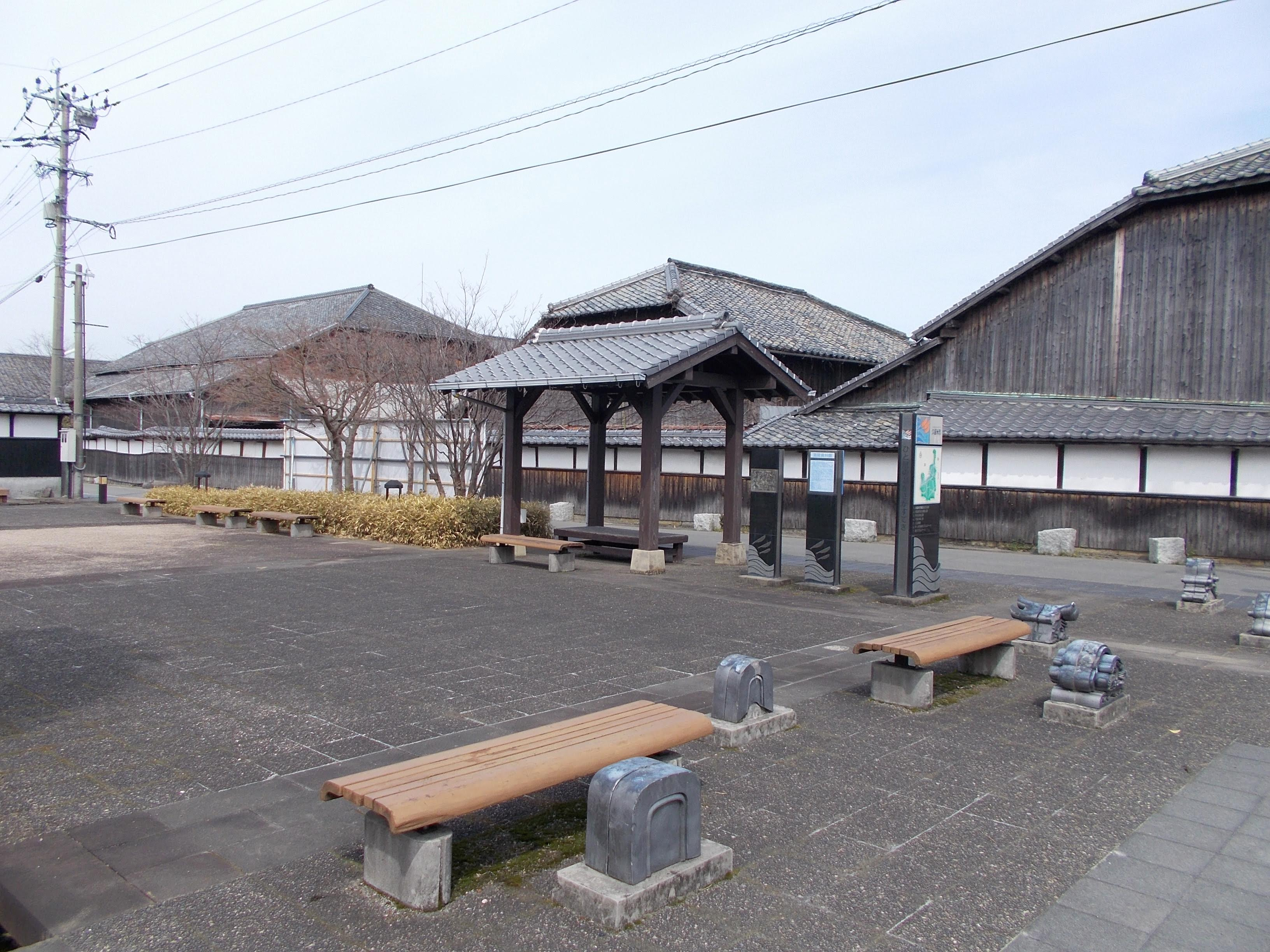
The Hananotsuyu Sake Brewing company

Jojima has been famous for Japanese Sake blessed with rice from Chikugo plain and water from Chikugo river since Meiji Era. Every February, they celebrate the opening of a storehouse for the first time in the New Year.
