= Miike District =

Former district of Fukuoka Prefecture, Japan

Coordinates: 33°06′21″N 130°29′37″E

Miike (三池郡, Miike-gun) was a district located in Fukuoka Prefecture, Japan.

As of 2003, the district had an estimated population of 14,525 and a density of 354.18 persons per km^{2}. The total area was 41.01 km^{2}.

== Former towns and villages ==
- Takata

== Merger ==
- On January 29, 2007 - the town of Takata, along with the towns of Setaka and Yamakawa (both from Yamato District), was merged to create the city of Miyama.
