= Kiyomizu-dera (Miyama, Fukuoka) =

Buddhist temple in Miyama, Fukuoka, Japan

- 清水寺
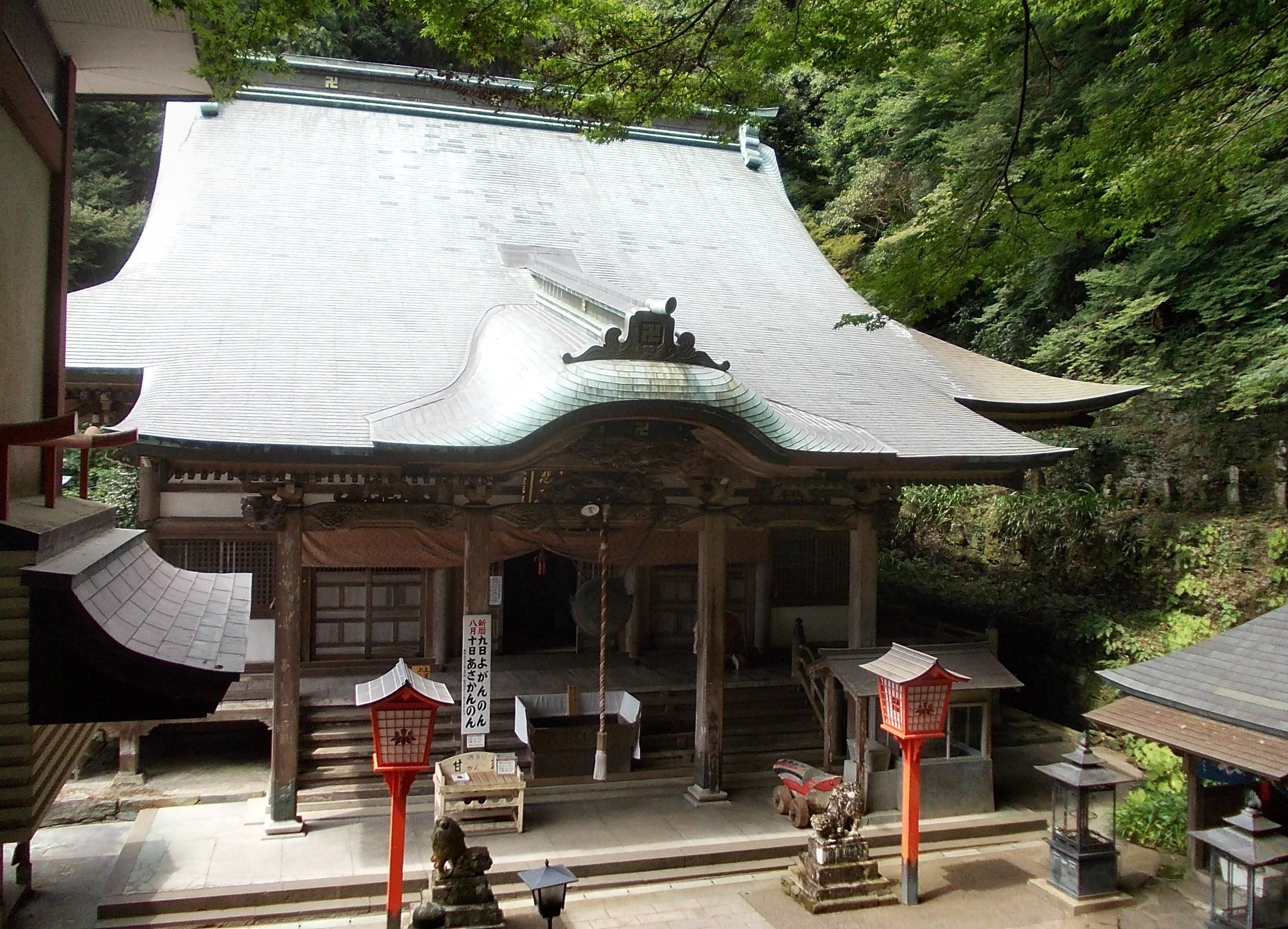
- The temple's main hall

Religion
- Affiliation: Tendai

Location
- Location: Miyama, Fukuoka, Japan
- Interactive map of Kiyomizu-dera
- Coordinates: 33°9′3.9″N 130°31′31.5″E

Architecture
- Founder: Saichō

Website
- Official website

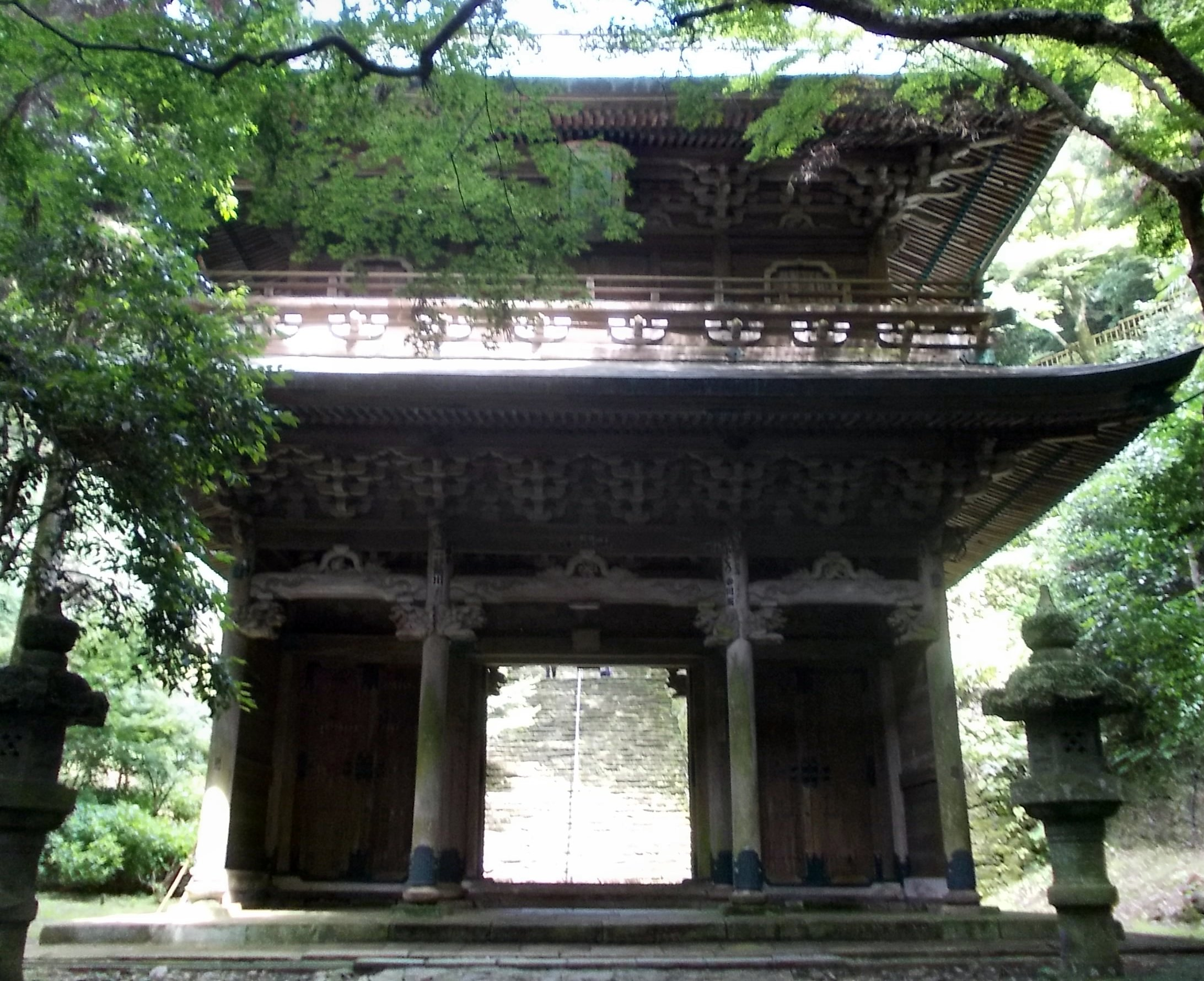
The sanmon gate

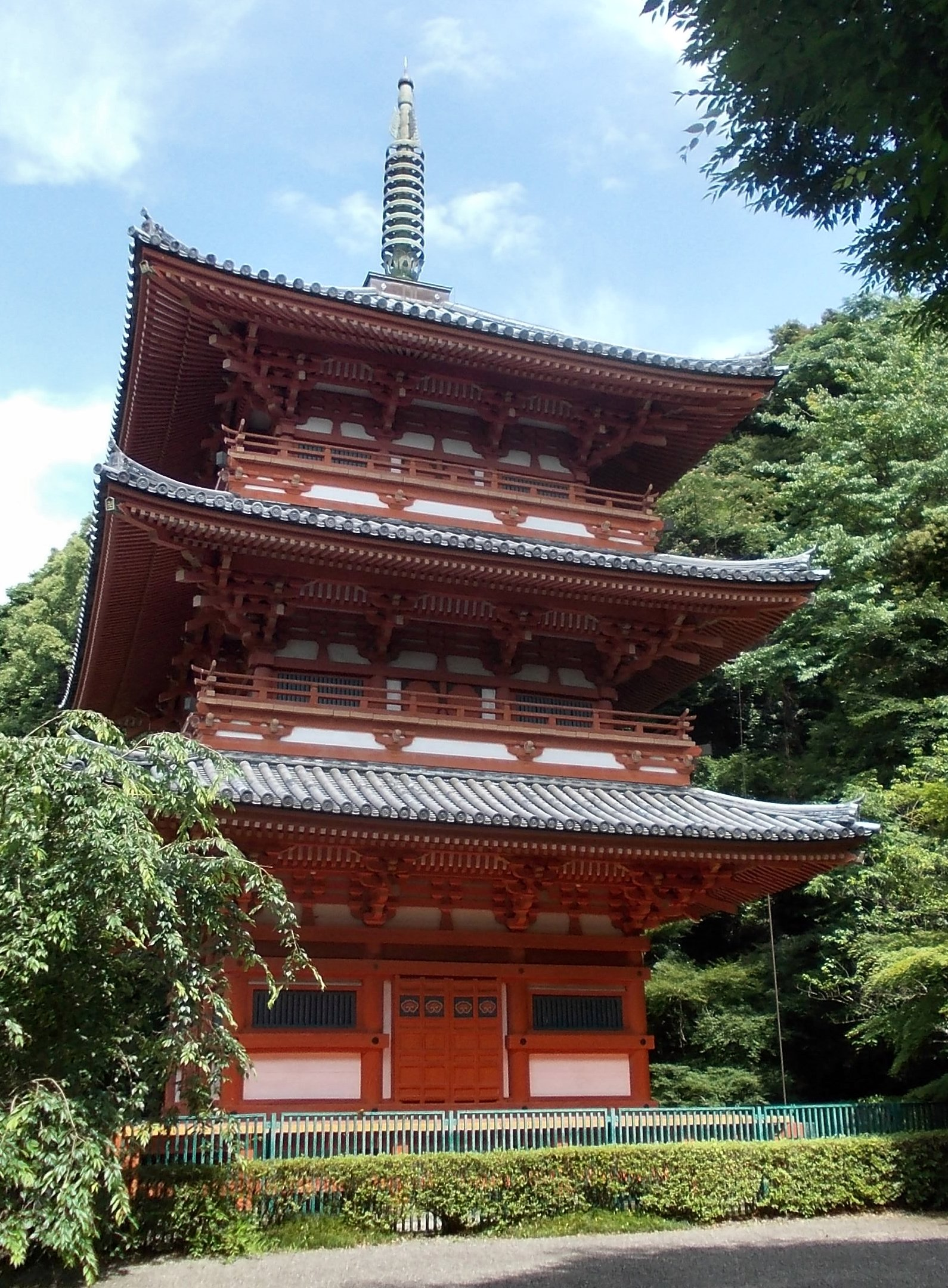
A three-story pagoda, a replica of the five-story pagoda Shitennō-ji Temple in Osaka.

Kiyomizu-dera (清水寺) is a Tendai temple in Miyama, Fukuoka, Japan. Its honorary sangō prefix is Motoyoshizan (本吉山).

According to legend, Kiyomizu-dera was founded in the Heian period by Saichō, who went to China in 804 and 805, mastered Tendai Buddhism, and returned to Japan in 806. After he returned to Japan, he was guided to Mount Kiyomizu by a bird and found nemu trees in the mountain. He cropped them and created a pair of Bodhisattva Kannon statues, enshrining one in Kiyomizu-dera in Kyoto. The remaining Buddha is enshrined in this temple.

The sanmon main gate was built in 1745 by Yanagawa Domain Sadanori Tachibana. A three-story pagoda, a replica of the five-story pagoda Shitennō-ji Temple in Osaka, was originally built in 1836. The present pagoda was rebuilt in 1984. Both have been designated Prefectural Cultural Properties.
