= Takata, Fukuoka =

Dissolved municipality in Fukuoka prefecture, Japan

Takata (高田町, Takata-machi) was a town located in Miike District, Fukuoka Prefecture, Japan.

As of 2003, the town had an estimated population of 14,525 and a density of 354.18 persons per km^{2}. The total area was 41.01 km^{2}.

On January 29, 2007, Takata, along with the towns of Setaka and Yamakawa (both from Yamato District), was merged to create the city of Miyama.
