= Yamato, Fukuoka =

Dissolved municipality in Fukuoka prefecture, Japan

Yamato (大和町, Yamato-machi) was a town located in Yamato District, Fukuoka Prefecture, Japan.

As of 2003, the town had an estimated population of 16,943 and a density of 743.77 persons per km^{2}. The total area was 22.78 km^{2}.

On March 21, 2005, Yamato, along with the town of Mitsuhashi (also from Yamato District), was merged into the expanded city of Yanagawa.

== History ==
The town was established as a village in 1907, and promoted to a town in 1952.
