= Yamato District, Fukuoka =

Former district in Fukuoka prefecture, Japan

Coordinates: 33°08′32″N 130°27′41″E

Yamato (山門郡, Yamato-gun) was a district located in Fukuoka Prefecture, Japan..

As of 2003, the district had an estimated population of 64,913 and a density of 625.49 persons per km^{2}. The total area was 103.78 km^{2}.

== Former towns and villages ==
- Setaka
- Yamakawa

== Merger ==
- On March 21, 2005 - the towns of Mitsuhashi and Yamato were merged into the expanded city of Yanagawa.
- On January 29, 2007 - the towns of Setaka and Yamakawa, along with the town of Takata (from Miike District), were merged to create the city of Miyama. Yamato District was dissolved as a result of this merger.
