= Yoshii, Fukuoka =

Dissolved municipality in Fukuoka prefecture, Japan

Yoshii (吉井町, Yoshii-machi) was a town located in Ukiha District, Fukuoka Prefecture, Japan.

As of 2003, the town had an estimated population of 17,223 and a density of 608.80 persons per km^{2}. The total area was 28.29 km^{2}.

On March 20, 2005, Yoshii, along with the former town of Ukiha (also from Ukiha District), was merged to create the city of Ukiha.

== See also ==
- Groups of Traditional Buildings
