= Yamakawa, Fukuoka =

Dissolved municipality in Fukuoka prefecture, Japan

Yamakawa (山川町, Yamakawa-machi) was a town located in Yamato District, Fukuoka Prefecture, Japan.

As of 2003, the town had an estimated population of 5,522 and a density of 209.33 persons per km^{2}. The total area was 26.38 km^{2}.

On January 29, 2007, Yamakawa, along with the town of Setaka (also from Yamato District), and the town of Takata (from Miike District), was merged to create the city of Miyama.
