= Katsuyama, Fukuoka =

Dissolved municipality in Fukuoka prefecture, Japan

Katsuyama (勝山町, Katsuyama-machi) was a town located in Miyako District, Fukuoka Prefecture, Japan.

As of 2003, the town had an estimated population of 7,319 and a density of 215.65 persons per km^{2}. The total area was 33.94 km^{2}.

On March 20, 2006, Katsuyama, along with the towns of Saigawa and Toyotsu (all from Miyako District), was merged to create the town of Miyako.
