= Saigawa, Fukuoka =

Dissolved municipality in Fukuoka prefecture, Japan

Saigawa (犀川町, Saigawa-machi) was a town located in Miyako District, Fukuoka Prefecture, Japan.

== Population ==
As of 2003, the town had an estimated population of 7,268 and a density of 74.16 persons per km^{2}. The total area was 98.00 km^{2}.

== History ==
On March 20, 2006, Saigawa, along with the towns of Katsuyama and Toyotsu (all from Miyako District), was merged to create the town of Miyako.
