= Toyotsu, Fukuoka =

Dissolved municipality in Fukuoka prefecture, Japan

Toyotsu (豊津町, Toyotsu-machi) was a town located in Miyako District, Fukuoka Prefecture, Japan.

As of 2006, the town had an estimated population of 8,566 and a density of 442.92 persons per km^{2}. The total area was 19.34 km^{2}.

On March 20, 2006, Toyotsu, along with the towns of Katsuyama and Saigawa (all from Miyako District), was merged to create the town of Miyako.
