= Wataze Station =

Railway station in Miyama, Fukuoka Prefecture, Japan

JB 24 Wataze Station 渡瀬駅
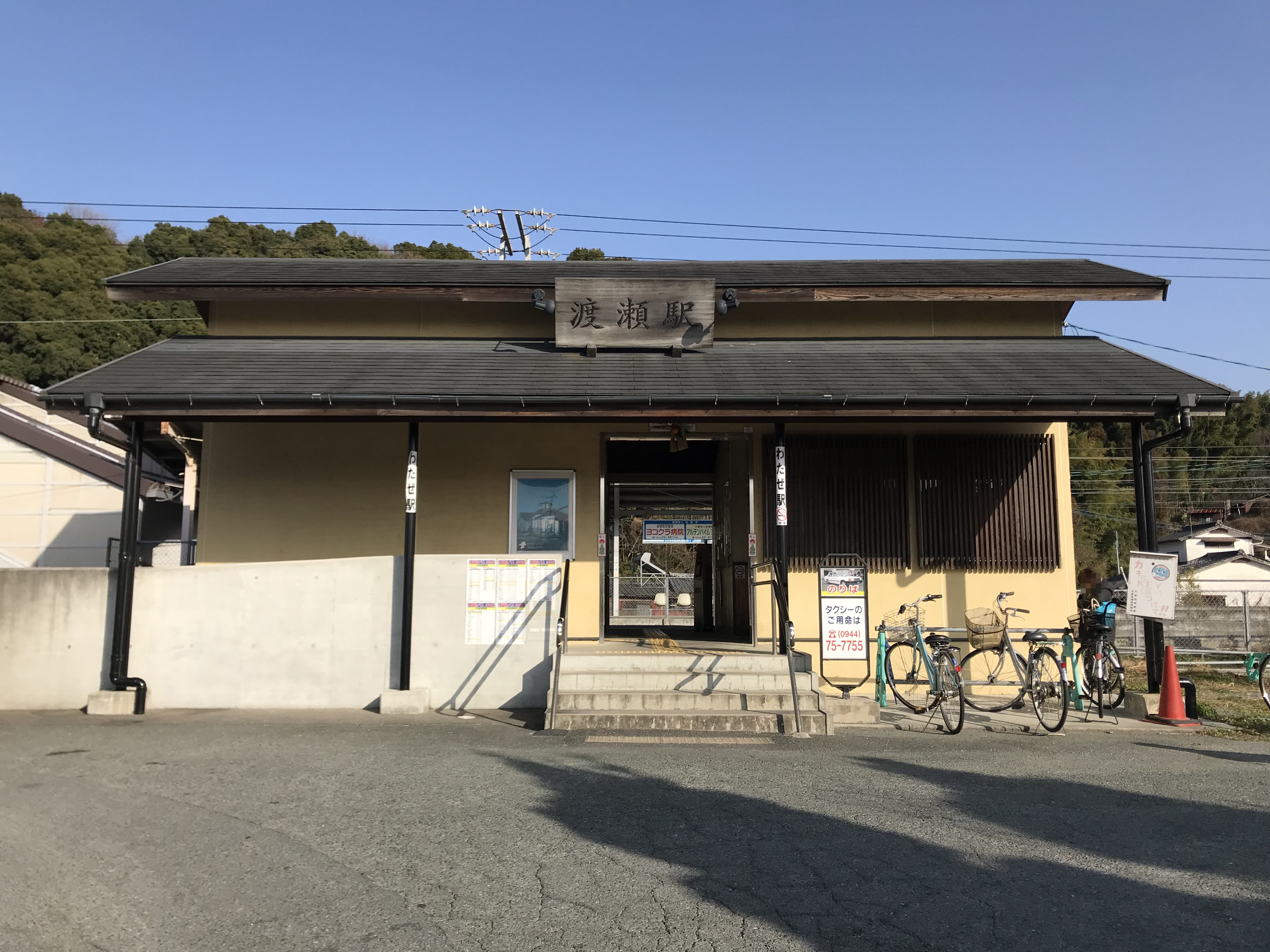
- Wataze Station in 2018

General information
- Location: Takatamachi Nose, Miyama-shi, Fukuoka-ken 839-0215; Japan
- Coordinates: 33°5′59.6″N 130°27′35.2″E
- Operator: JR Kyushu
- Line: JB Kagoshima Main Line
- Distance: 139.1 km from Mojikō
- Platforms: 2 side platforms
- Tracks: 2

Construction
- Structure type: At grade
- Parking: Available
- Accessible: No - platforms linked by footbridge

Other information
- Status: Kan'i itaku ticket window
- Station code: JB24
- Website: Official website

History
- Opened: 7 June 1891

Passengers
- FY2018: 512 daily

Services
| Preceding station | JR Kyushu | Following station |
|---|---|---|
| Yoshino towards Kagoshima | Kagoshima Main Line | Minami-Setaka towards Mojikō |
Location
- Location within Fukuoka Prefecture Location within Japan

Wataze Station (渡瀬駅, Wataze-eki) is a passenger railway station located in the city of Miyama, Fukuoka Prefecture, Japan. It is operated by JR Kyushu.

== Lines ==
The station is served by the Kagoshima Main Line and is located 139.1 km from the starting point of the line at Mojiko. Only local services on the line stop at the station.

== Layout ==
The station consists of two side platforms serving two tracks. The platforms are not opposed. Platform 2 was formerly an island platform but the centre track between it and platform 1 has been removed. The station building is a modern concrete building but has been built in traditional Japanese style with a double tiled roof. It houses a waiting room, a ticket window, an automatic ticket vending machine, a Sugoca charge machine and card reader. There is an accessibility ramp to the station building, but a footbridge is needed to access platform 2.

The ticket window is staffed by a kan'i itaku agent and is equipped with a POS machine but does not have a Midori no Madoguchi facility.

=== Platforms ===
| 1 | ■ JB Kagoshima Main Line | for Kurume, Tosu and Hakata |
| 2 | ■ JB Kagoshima Main Line | for Ōmuta, Kumamoto and Yatsushiro |

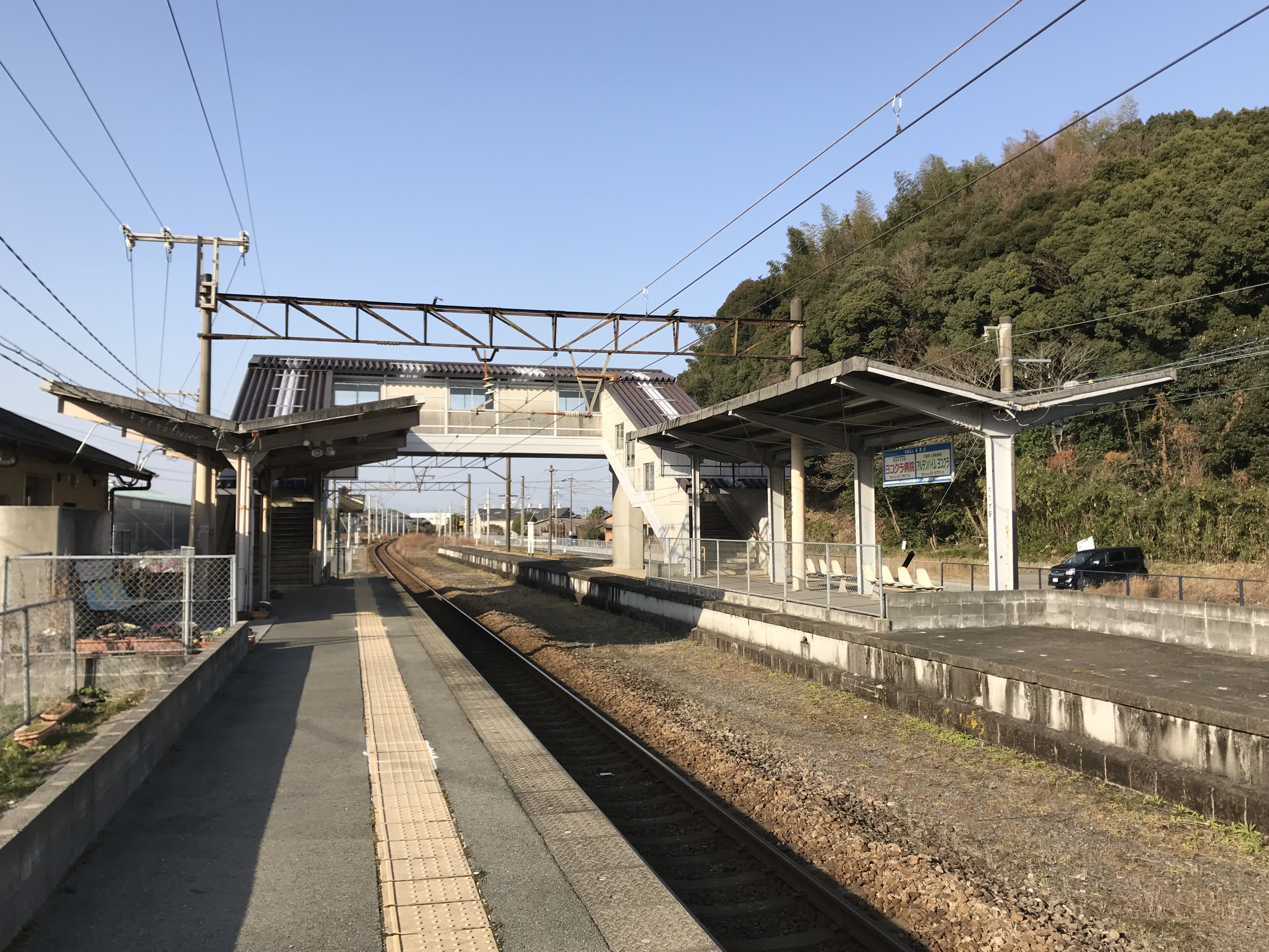
A view of the platforms and tracks. Note the platform to the right was once an island but one of its tracks has been removed.

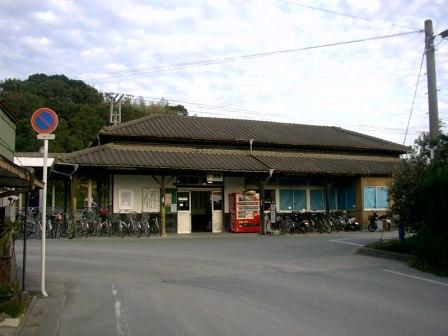
The old station building. This picture was taken in 2004.

== History ==
The privately run Kyushu Railway had opened a stretch of track between Hakata and the (now closed) Chitosegawa temporary stop on 11 December 1889. After several phases of expansion northwards and southwards, by February 1891, the line stretched from Kurosaki south to Kurume. In the next phase of expansion, the track was extended south with Takase (now Tamana opening as the new southern terminus on 1 April 1891. Wataze was opened a few months later, on 7 June 1891, as an additional station between Kurume and Takase. When the Kyushu Railway was nationalized on 1 July 1907, Japanese Government Railways (JGR) took over control of the station. On 12 October 1909, the station became part of the Hitoyoshi Main Line and then on 21 November 1909, part of the Kagoshima Main Line. With the privatization of Japanese National Railways (JNR), the successor of JGR, on 1 April 1987, JR Kyushu took over control of the station.

== Surrounding area ==
- Miyama City Hall Takada Branch
- Miyama City Futagawa Elementary School

== See also ==
- List of railway stations in Japan
