= Mitsuhashi, Fukuoka =

Dissolved municipality in Fukuoka prefecture, Japan

Mitsuhashi (三橋町, Mitsuhashi-machi) was a town located in Yamato District, Fukuoka Prefecture, Japan.

As of 2003, the town had an estimated population of 18,227 and a density of 1,079.16 persons per km^{2}. The total area was 16.89 km^{2}.

On March 21, 2005, Mitsuhashi, along with the town of Yamato (also from Yamato District), was merged into the expanded city of Yanagawa.

Mitsuhashi is the setting of the anime Hamtaro.
