= Japan National Route 209 =

Road in Fukuoka prefecture, Japan

National Route 209
- 国道209号
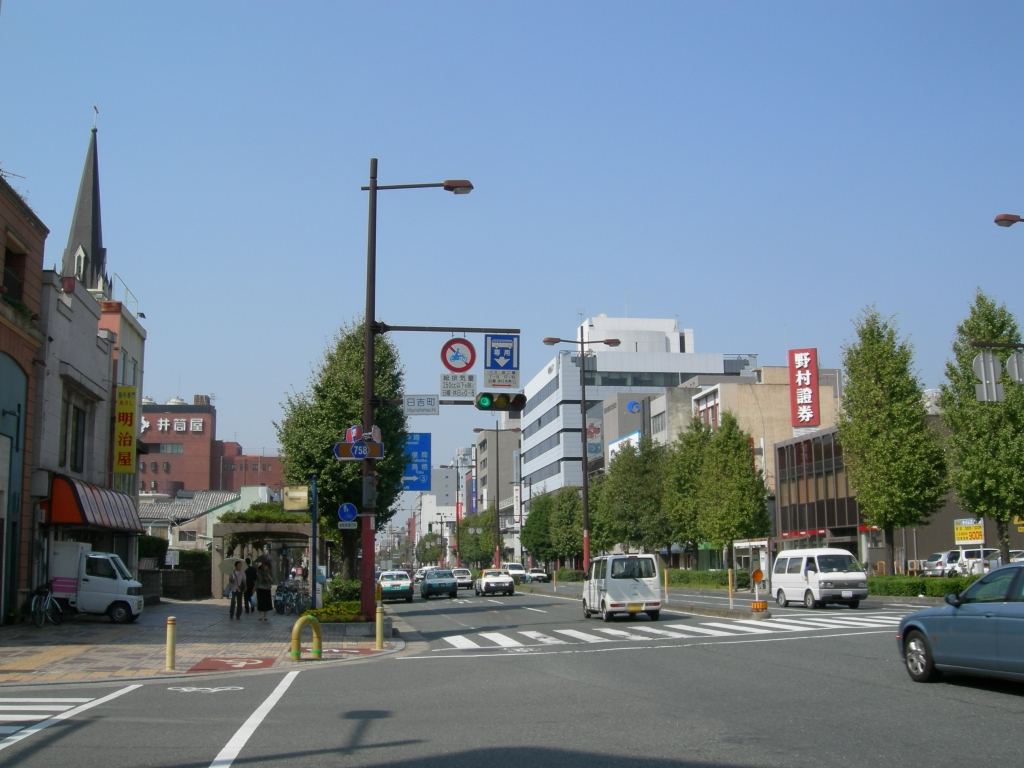

Route information
- Length: 35.5 km (22.1 mi)
- Existed: 18 May 1953–present

Major junctions
- North end: National Route 3 in Kurume
- South end: National Route 208 in Ōmuta

Location
- Country: Japan

Highway system
- National highways of Japan; Expressways of Japan
← National Route 208	→ National Route 210

National Route 209 is a national highway of Japan connecting Ōmuta and Kurume in Japan, with a total length of 35.5 km (22.06 mi).
