= Mizuma District =

District in Fukuoka Prefecture

Coordinates: 33.2146°N 130.4412°E

Location of Mizuma District in Fukuoka Prefecture

Mizuma (三潴郡, Mizuma-gun) is a district located in Fukuoka Prefecture, Japan.

As of 2003 statistics and counting the decrease in size and population due to the Kurume merger, the district has an estimated population of 14,305 and a density of 776 persons per km^{2}. The total area is 18.43 km^{2}.

== Towns and villages ==
- Ōki

== Mergers ==
- On February 5, 2005 the former towns of Jōjima and Mizuma merged with two towns (from other districts) into the expanded city of Kurume.
