= Mii District, Fukuoka =

District in Fukuoka prefecture, Japan

Coordinates: 33.3887°N 130.607°E

Location of Mii District in Fukuoka Prefecture

Mii (三井郡, Mii-gun) is a district located in Fukuoka Prefecture, Japan.

As of 2003 statistics (but following the merger of Kitano), the district has an estimated population of 15,378 and a density of 674 persons per km^{2}. The total area is 22.83 km^{2}.

== Towns and villages ==
- Tachiarai

== Mergers ==
- On February 5, 2005 the former town of Kitano merged with three other towns (from other districts) into the city of Kurume.
