= Japan National Route 208 =

National highway of Japan

National Route 208
- 国道208号
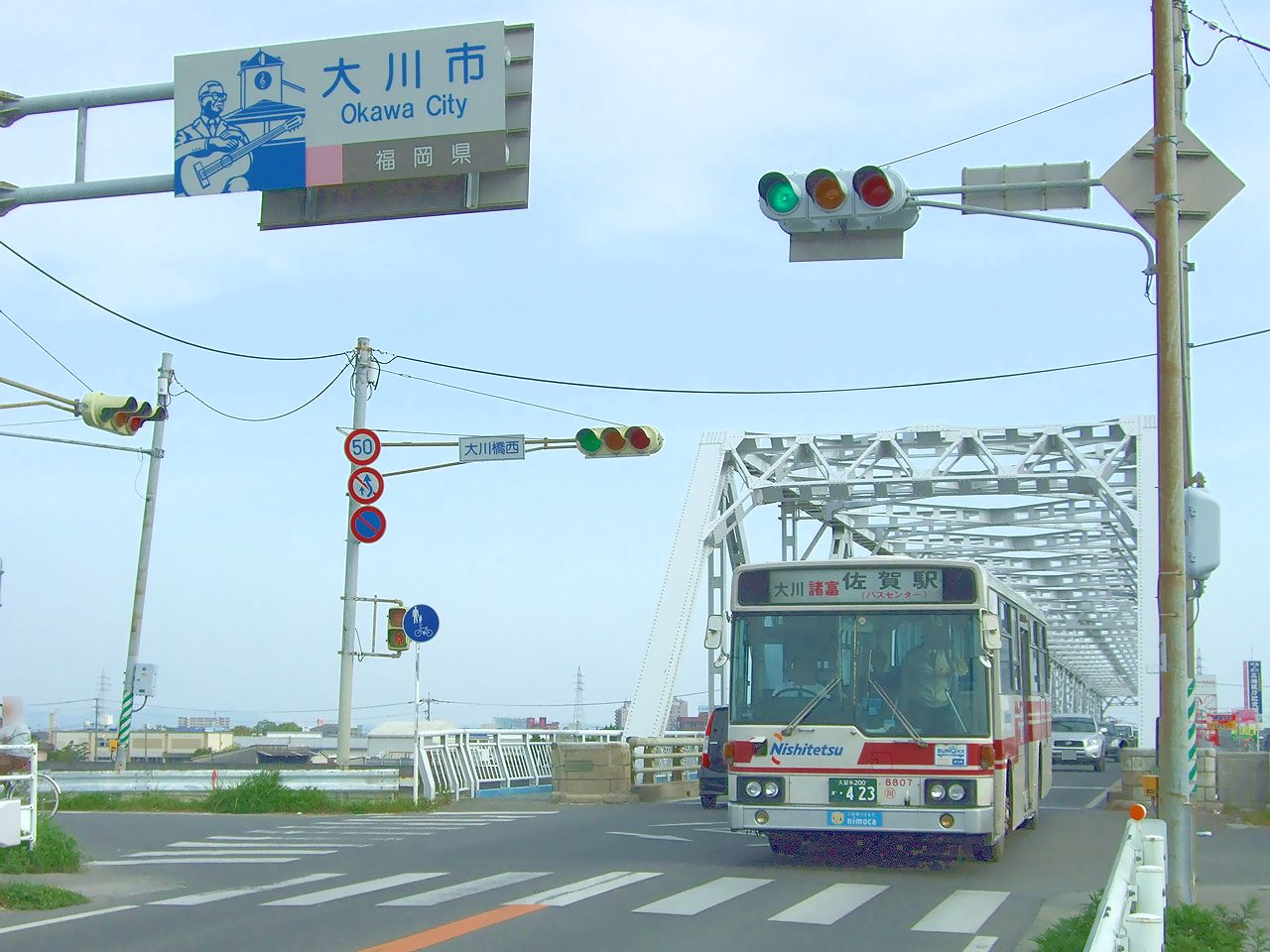

Route information
- Length: 84.7 km (52.6 mi)

Location
- Country: Japan

Highway system
- National highways of Japan; Expressways of Japan
← National Route 207	→ National Route 209

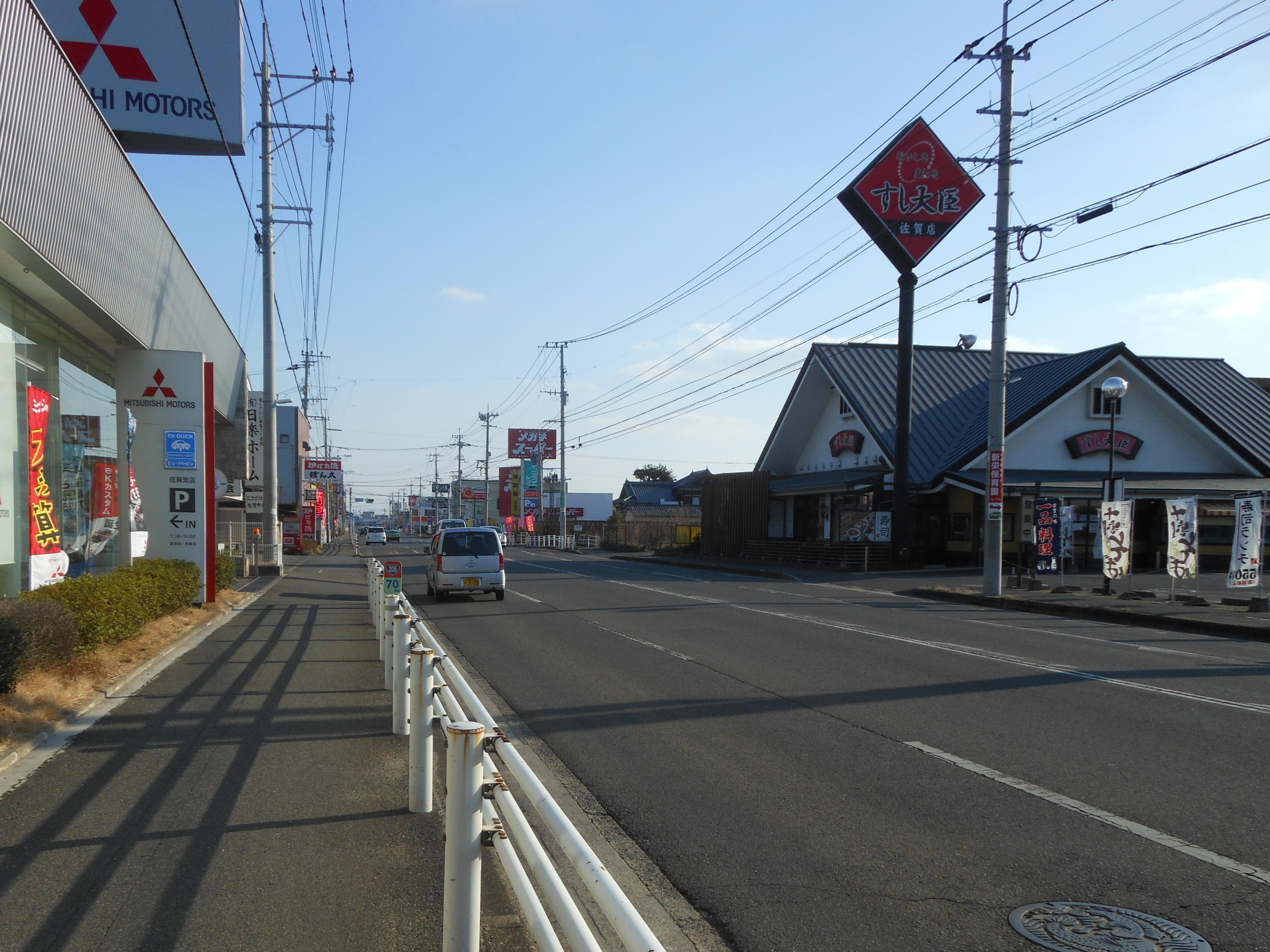
National Route 208 in Saga

National Route 208 is a national highway of Japan connecting Chūō-ku, Kumamoto and Saga, Saga in Japan, with a total length of 84.7 km (52.63 mi).
