= Ōmuta (disambiguation) =

Ōmuta is a city in Japan.

Ōmuta may also refer to:

- Ōmuta Station, a train station located in Ōmuta
- Ōmuta murders, a series of murders committed by the Kitamura-gumi yakuza family in Japan

== See also ==
- Shin-Ōmuta Station, a shinkansen train station in Ōmuta, Japan
- Tenjin Ōmuta Line, a heavy rail line in Japan
