= Araki Station (Fukuoka) =

Railway station in Kurume, Fukuoka Prefecture, Japan

JB 18 Araki Station 荒木駅
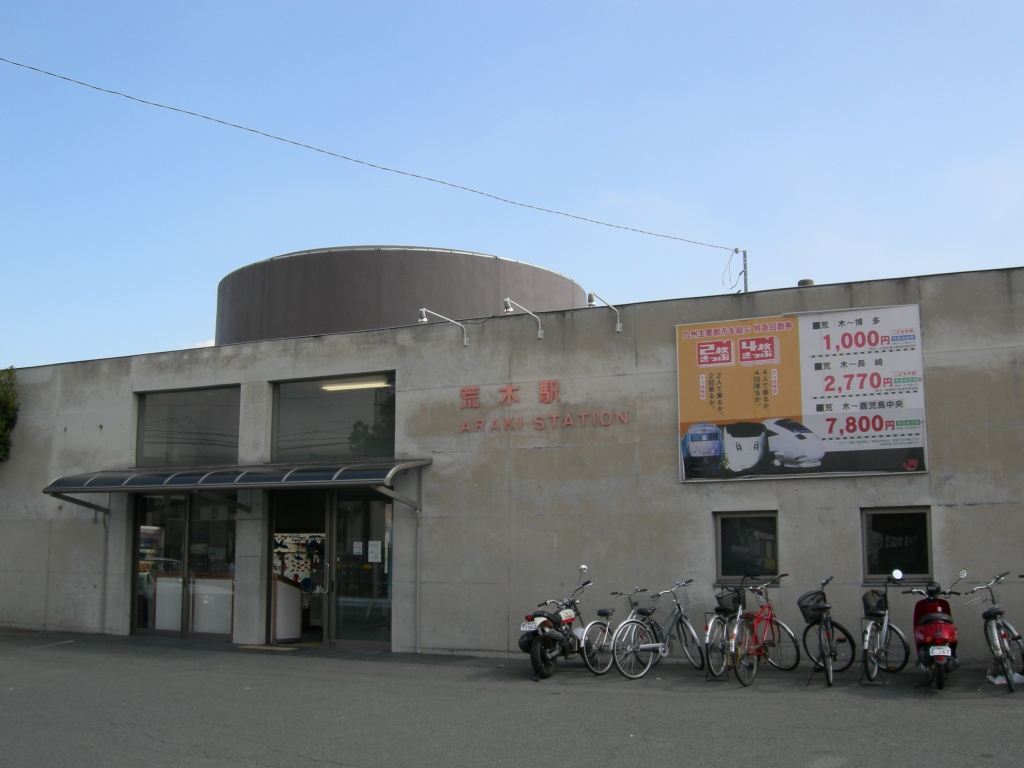
- Araki Station in 2006

General information
- Location: Shirakuchi Arakimachi, Kurume-shi, Fukuoka-ken 830-0062; Japan
- Coordinates: 33°16′34″N 130°30′09″E
- Operator: JR Kyushu
- Line: JB Kagoshima Main Line,
- Distance: 118.8 km from Mojikō
- Platforms: 2 island platforms
- Tracks: 4 + 1 passing loop + numerous sidings

Construction
- Structure type: At grade
- Accessible: No - platforms accessed by footbridge

Other information
- Status: Staffed ticket window (Midori no Madoguchi) (outsourced)
- Website: Official website

History
- Opened: 20 April 1910

Passengers
- FY2020: 1,029 daily
- Rank: 132nd (among JR Kyushu stations)

Services
Preceding station	JR Kyushu	Following station
Nishimuta JB 19 towards Kagoshima	Kagoshima Main Line Local	Kurume JB 17 towards Mojikō
Hainuzuka JB 20 towards Kagoshima	Kagoshima Main Line Rapid	Kurume JB 17 towards Mojikō
Location
- Location within Fukuoka Prefecture Location within Japan

Araki Station (荒木駅, Araki-eki) is a passenger railway station located in the city of Kurume, Fukuoka Prefecture, Japan. It is operated by JR Kyushu.

== Lines ==
The station is served by the Kagoshima Main Line and is located 118.8 km from the starting point of the line at Mojiko. Local and rapid services on the line stop at the station.

== Layout ==
The station consists of two island platforms serving four tracks at grade. A passing loop (track 5) runs east of platform/track 4. Further east are numerous sidings. Beyond them are the elevated tracks of the Kyushu Shinkansen which does not have a station here. The station building is a modern concrete block structure with a circular skylight. It houses a staffed ticket window and a narrow waiting area. Access to the island platforms is by means of a footbridge.

Management of the station has been outsourced to the JR Kyushu Tetsudou Eigyou Co., a wholly owned subsidiary of JR Kyushu specialising in station services. It staffs the ticket counter which is equipped with a Midori no Madoguchi facility.

=== Platforms ===
1, 2	■ JB Kagoshima Main Line	for Kurume, Tosu, Hakata
3, 4	■ JB Kagoshima Main Line	for Ōmuta and Kumamoto

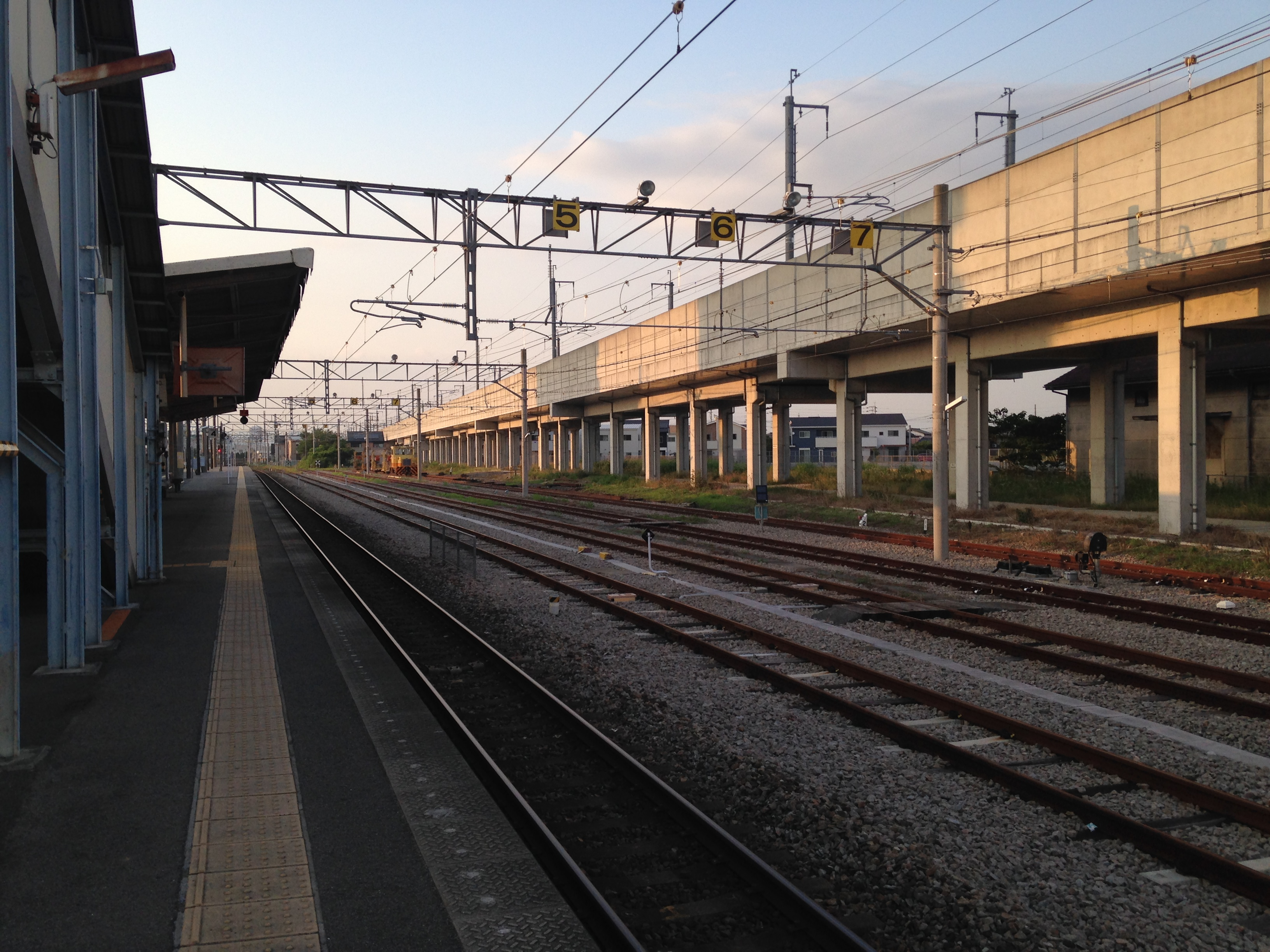
View from platform 4, showing the passing loop and sidings to the east (right) and the elevated Shinkansen tracks.

== History ==
The station was opened by Japanese Government Railways (JGR) on 20 April 1910 as an additional station on the existing Kagoshima Main Line track. With the privatization of Japanese National Railways (JNR), the successor of JGR, on 1 April 1987, JR Kyushu took over control of the station.

== Passenger statistics ==
In fiscal 2020, the station was used by an average of 1,029 passengers daily (boarding passengers only), and it ranked 132nd among the busiest stations of JR Kyushu.

== Surrounding area ==
- Kurume City Araki Junior High School
- Kurume City Araki Elementary School

== See also ==
- List of railway stations in Japan
