= Chikugo-Funagoya Station =

Railway station in Fukuoka Prefecture, Japan

JB 21 Chikugo-Funagoya Station 筑後船小屋駅
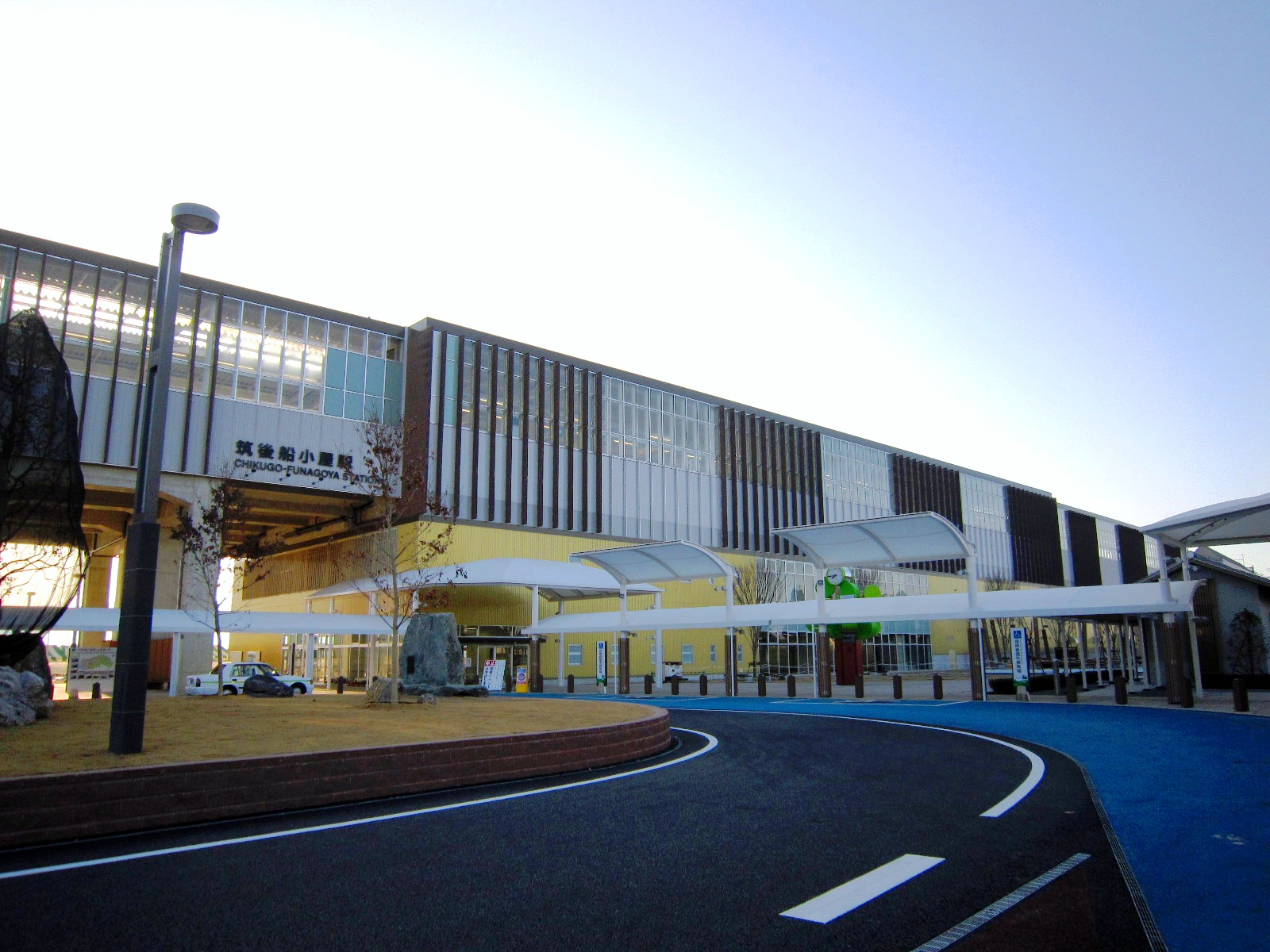
- Chikugo-Funagoya Station Shinkansen Entrance

General information
- Location: 1088-2 Higashi Tsushima (Shinkansen), 1101-4 Higashi Tsushima (Conventional lines); Japan
- Coordinates: 33°10′41″N 130°29′33″E
- Operator: JR Kyushu
- Lines: Kyūshū Shinkansen; Kagoshima Main Line
- Distance: 129.7 km (80.6 mi) from Mojikō (Kagoshima Main Line); 47.9 km (29.8 mi) from Hakata (Kyūshū Shinkansen)
- Platforms: Shinkansen: 1 side] + 1 island platform (Shinkansen); Conventional lines: 2 side platforms
- Tracks: Shinkansen: 3 (1 bypass); Conventional lines: 2

Construction
- Structure type: At grade (Kagoshima Main Line); Elevated (Kyushu Shinkansen)
- Parking: Available
- Cycle facilities: Bike shed
- Accessible: Yes - elevators

Other information
- Status: Staffed ticket window (Midori no Madoguchi)
- Website: Official website

History
- Opened: 20 July 1928; 98 years ago
- Former names: Funagoya (until 2011)

Passengers
- FY2020: 771 daily
- Rank: 170th

Services
Preceding station	JR Kyushu	Following station
Shinkansen
Shin-Ōmuta towards Kagoshima-Chūō	Kyūshū Shinkansen Sakura (Some trains only) Tsubame	Kurume towards Hakata
Rapid/Local
Setaka JB 22 towards Kagoshima	Kagoshima Main Line Local Rapid	Hainuzuka JB 20 towards Mojikō
Location
- Location within Fukuoka Prefecture Location within Kyushu Location within Japan

Chikugo-Funagoya Station (筑後船小屋駅, Chikugo-Funagoya-eki) is a passenger railway station located in the city of Chikugo, Fukuoka Prefecture, Japan. It is operated by JR Kyushu.

== Lines ==
The station is served by the Kagoshima Main Line and is located 129.7 km from the starting point of the line at Mojiko.

In addition, the station is served by the Kyūshū Shinkansen and is located 47.9 km from the starting point of the line at Hakata. All Tsubame services and some Sakura services stop at the station.

== Layout ==
The station is actually two separate facilities which share a common forecourt. The Kagoshima Main Line station, located slightly to the west, consists has two side platforms serving two tracks at grade. The station building, a modern concrete structure houses a waiting room, and a ticket window. Access to the opposite side platform is by means of a footbridge which is equipped with elevators. There is a tourism information centre located at the entrance to the station.

Management of the Kagoshima Main Line station has been outsourced to the JR Kyushu Tetsudou Eigyou Co., a wholly owned subsidiary of JR Kyushu specialising in station services. It staffs the ticket counter which is equipped with a Midori no Madoguchi facility.

The Shinkansen station is located across the forecourt to the east of the conventional station, connected by a sheltered walkway. This station consists of a side and an island platform, designated as platforms 11, 12 and 13, serving three elevated tracks. The station building is built into the elevated structure and houses a waiting area and a ticket window staffed by JR Kyushu. Access to the platforms is by steps, escalators of elevators.

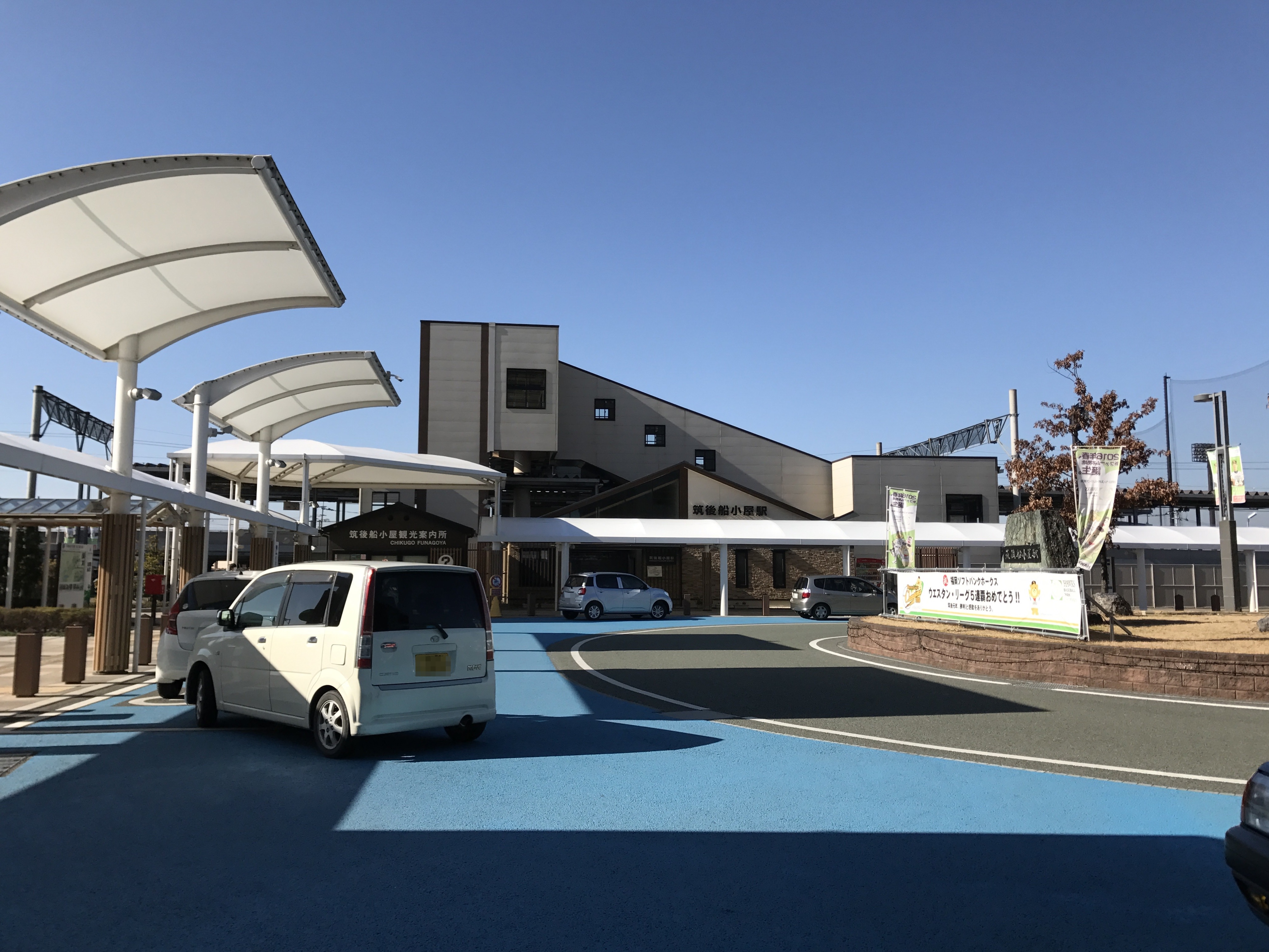
The Kagoshima Main Line station. The Shinkansen station is behind the camera.

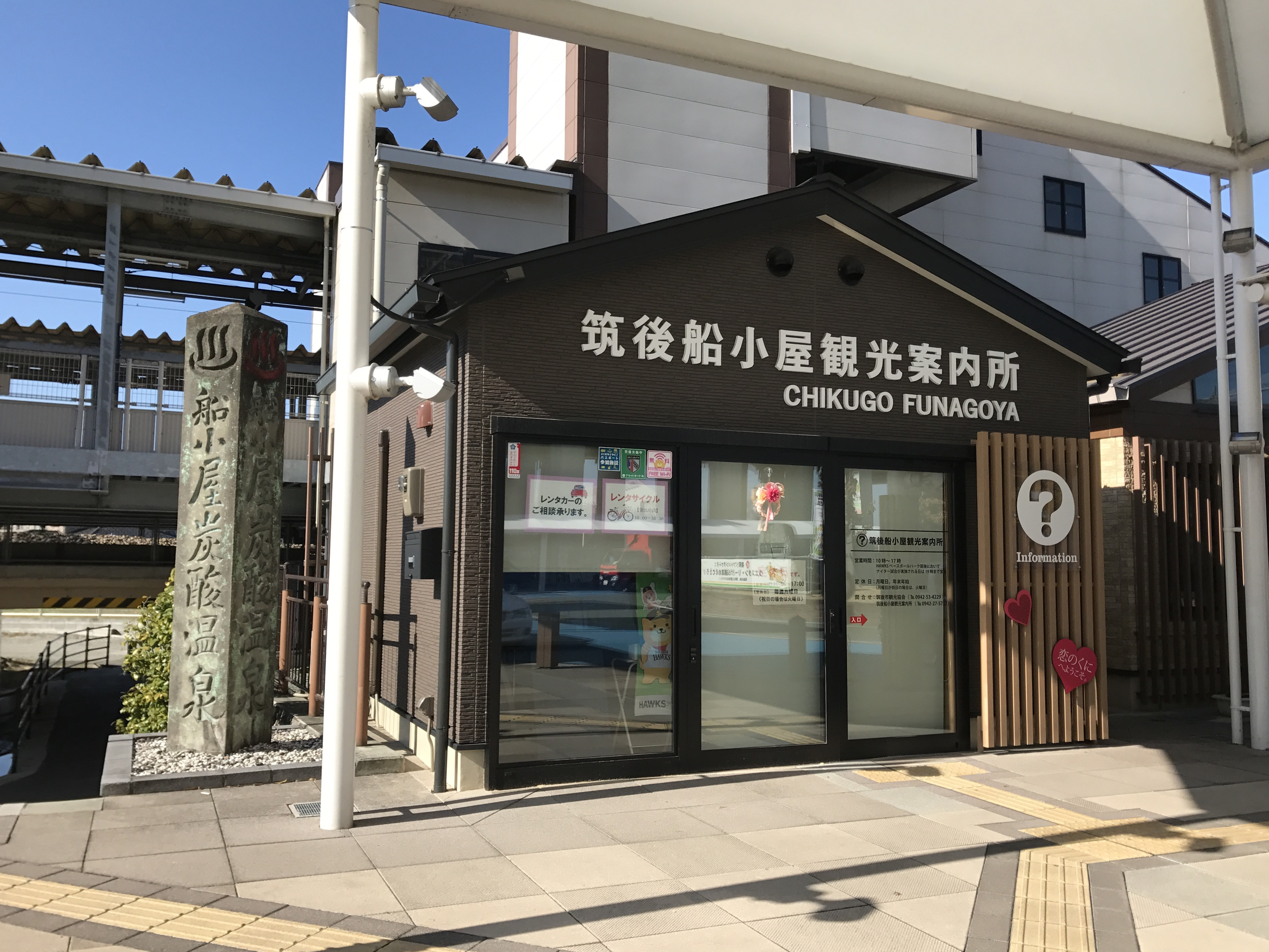
Chikugo-Funagoya Tourism Information Centre. The Kagoshima Main Line station entrance is to the right.

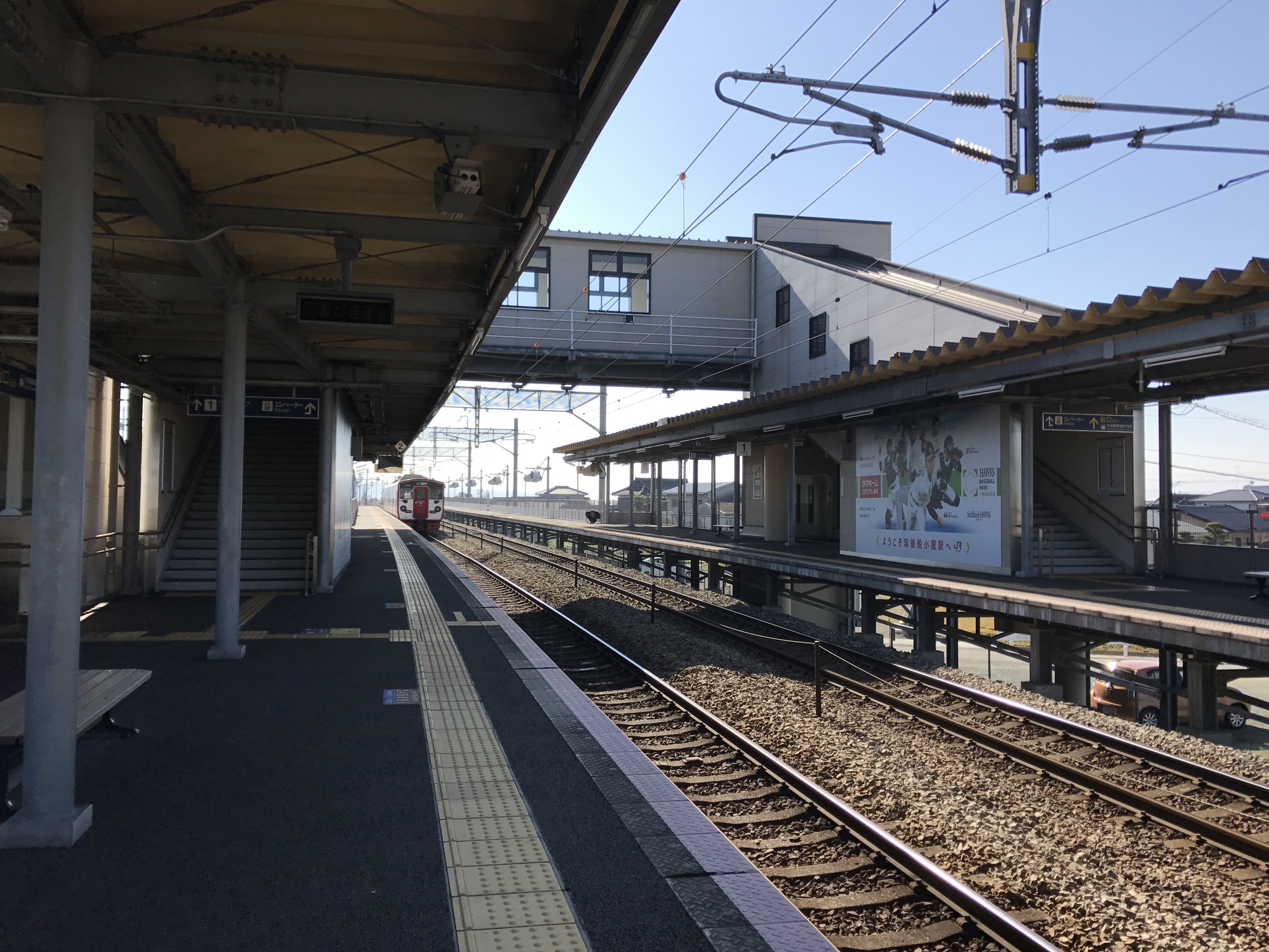
A view of the Kagoshima Main Line platforms and tracks.

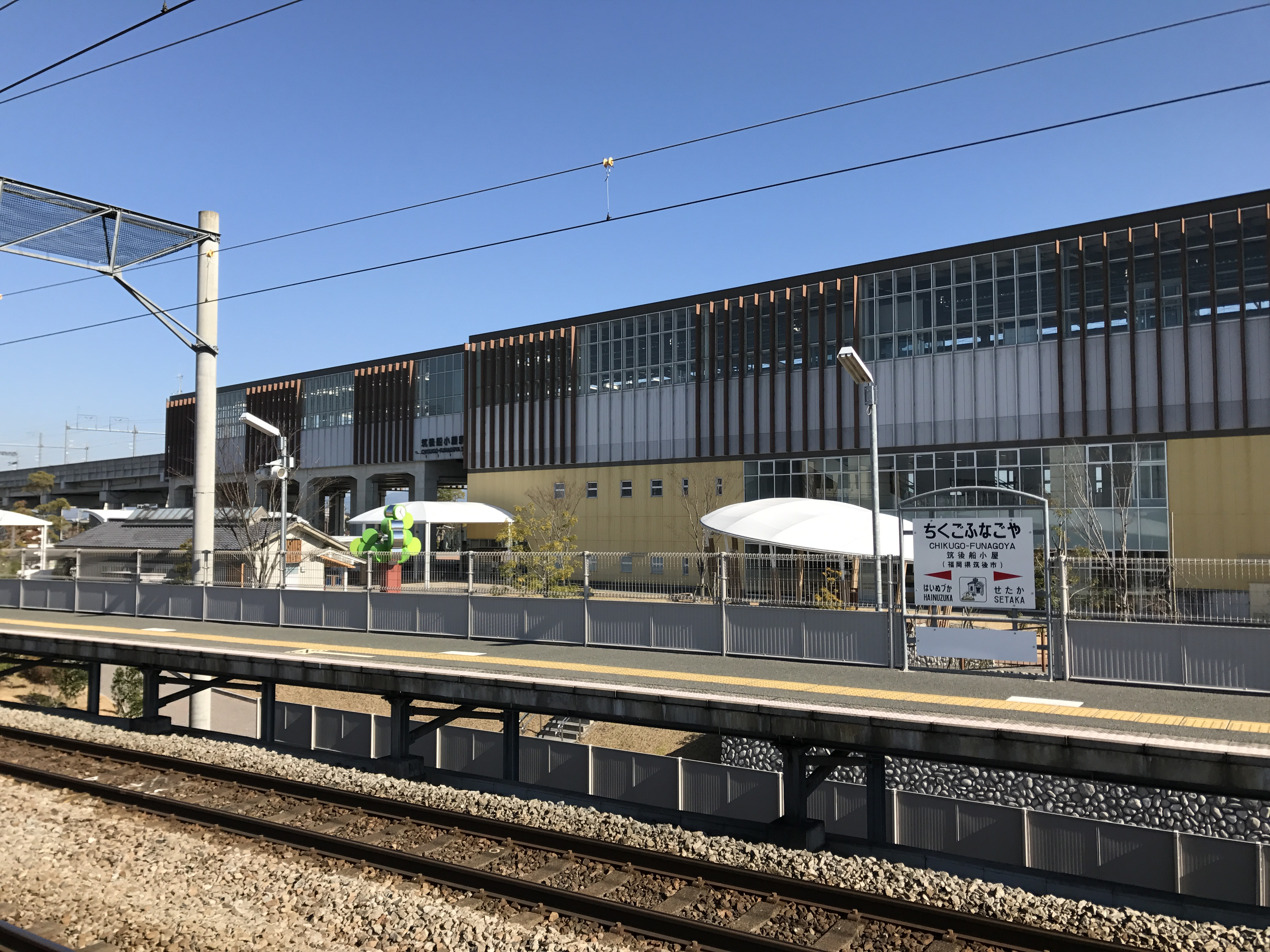
A view from the Kagoshima Main Line platform eastwards across the station forecourt towards the Shinkansen station.

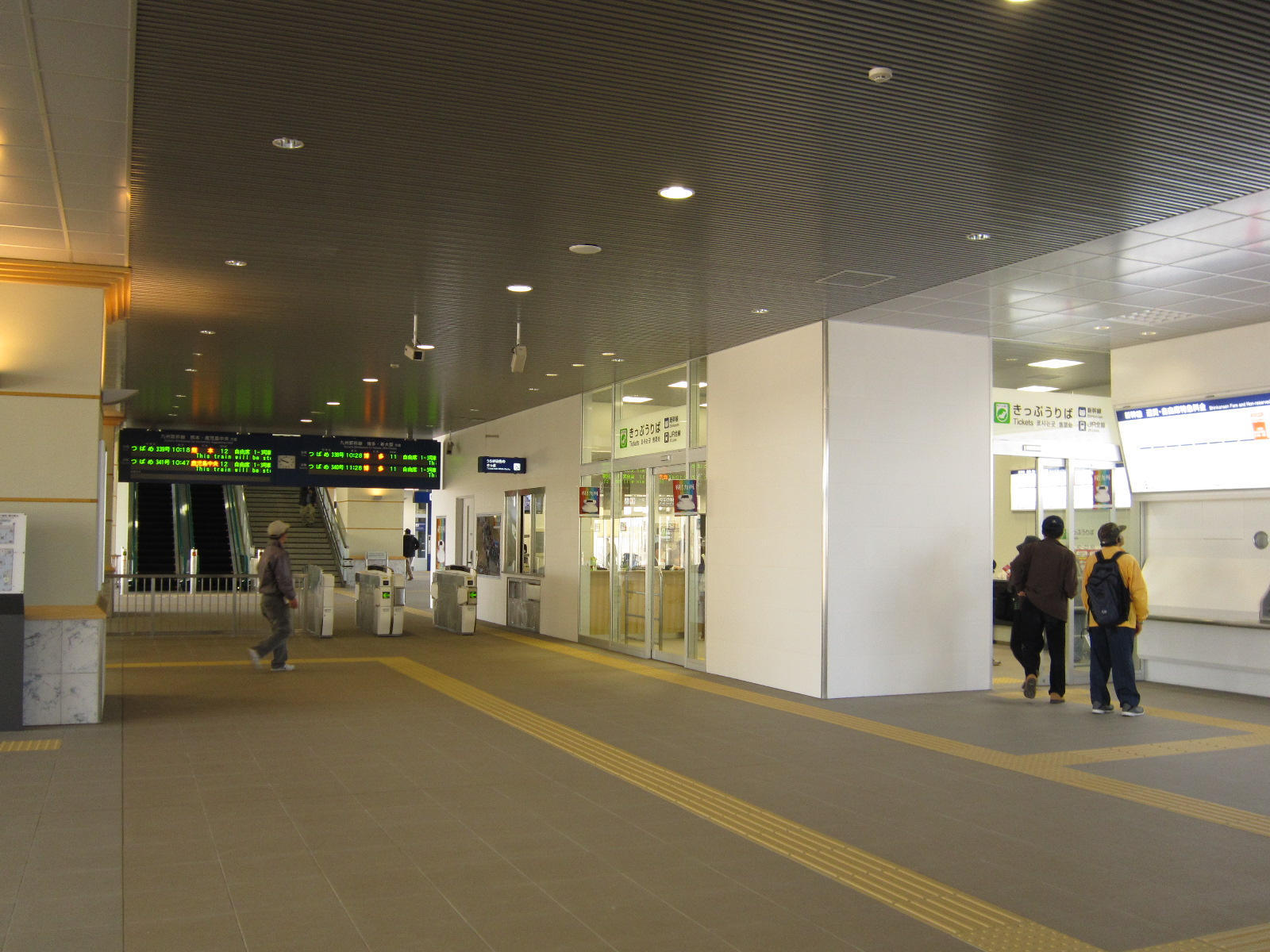
Ticket gates of the Shinkansen station.

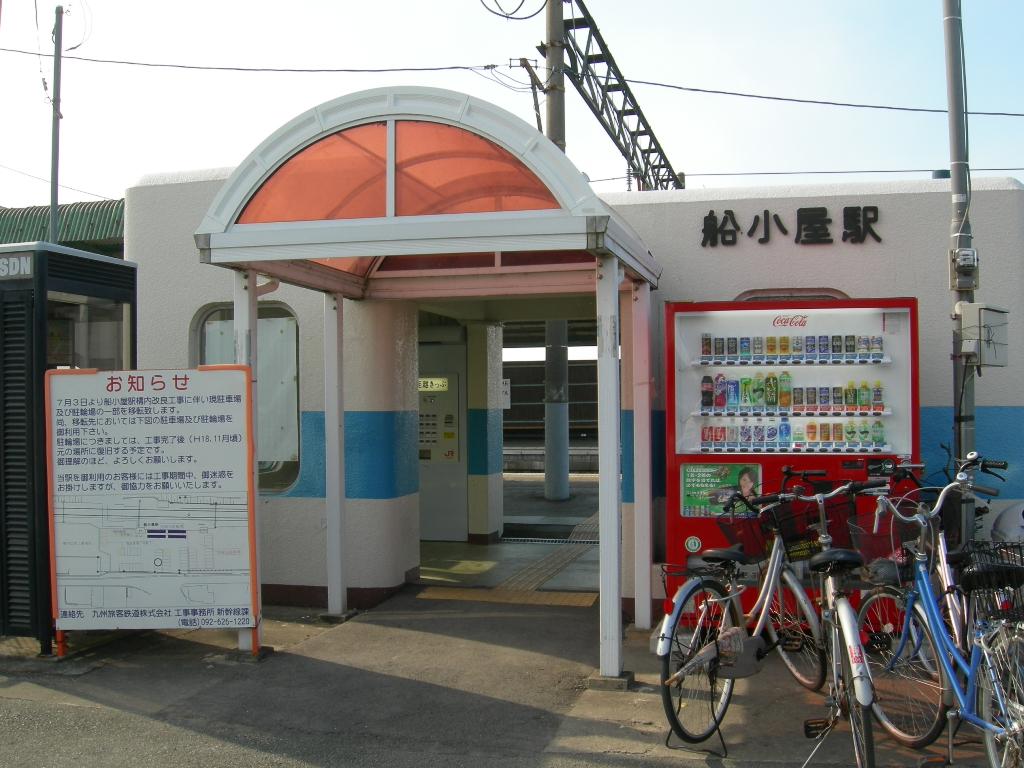
The old Funagoya station building, before it was moved. This picture was taken in 2006.

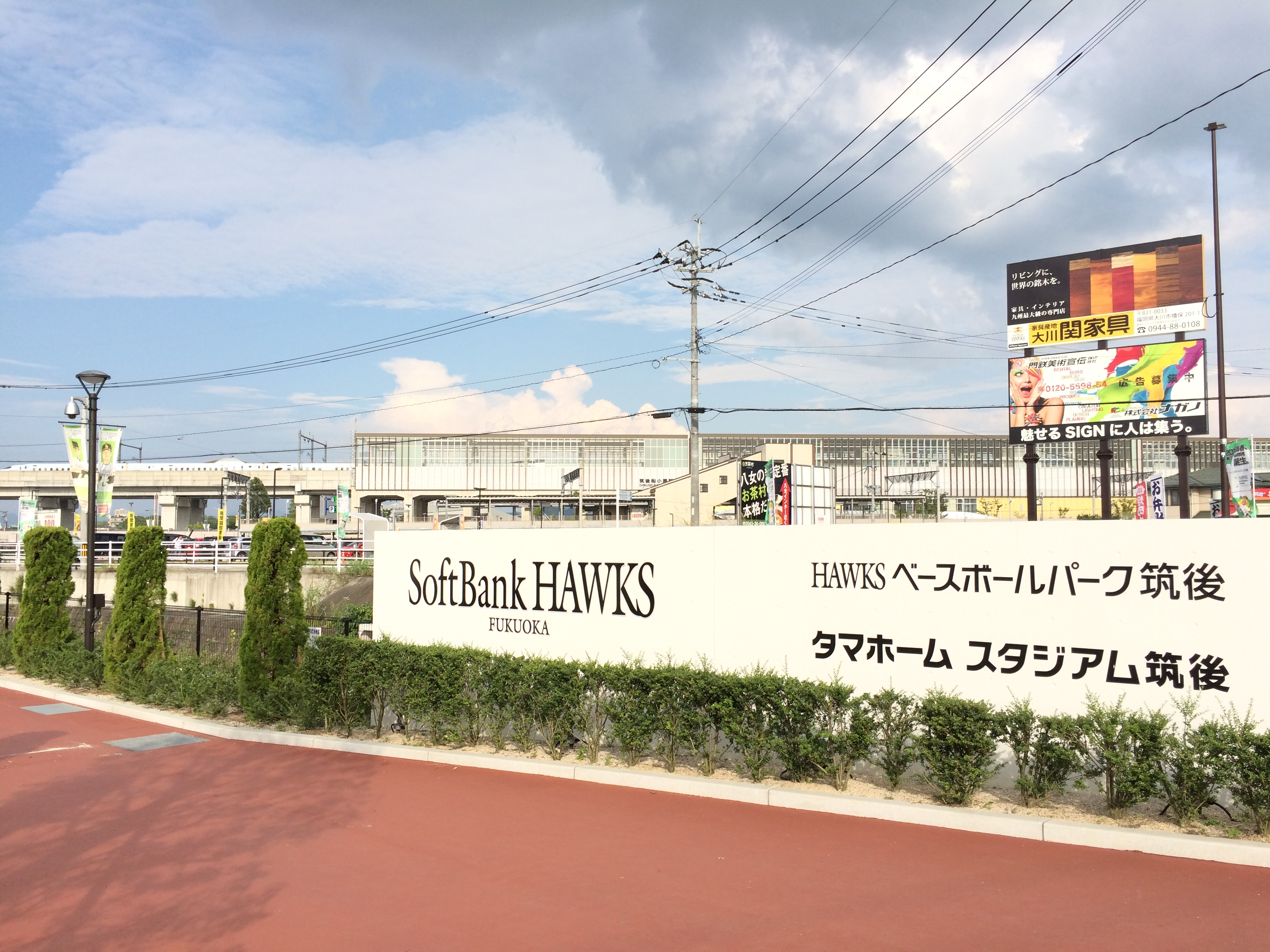
The Shinkansen Station with HAWKS Baseball Park Chikugo. An 800 Series train on a Tsubame service passing through the station is on the back.

== Platforms ==
1	■ JB Kagoshima Main Line	for Setaka, Ōmuta, and Kumamoto
2	■ JB Kagoshima Main Line	for Kurume, Hakata, and Kokura
11	■ Kyūshū Shinkansen	for Hakata and Shin-Ōsaka
12/13	■ Kyūshū Shinkansen	for Kumamoto and Kagoshima-Chūō

== History ==
The station was opened by Japanese Government Railways (JGR) on 20 July 1928 with the name Funagoya Station (船小屋駅) as an additional station on the existing Kagoshima Main Line track. With the privatization of Japanese National Railways (JNR), the successor of JGR, on 1 April 1987, JR Kyushu took over control of the station. With the inauguration of the Kyushu Shinkansen service to the station, the station building was moved 500 metres south and reopened with new Shinkansen platforms on 12 March 2011 and renamed Chikugo-Funangoya. The location of the old station was converted into a maintenance depot.

== Passenger statistics ==
In fiscal 2020, the station was used by an average of 329 passengers daily (boarding passengers only), and it ranked 265th among the busiest stations of JR Kyushu.

== Surrounding area ==
The station is located at the northern end of Chikugo City, and the city border with Kurume City runs in front of the station.

- Chikugo City Chikugokita Elementary School
- Kyushu Otani Junior College

== See also ==
- Nishi Kyushu Shinkansen#History
- List of railway stations in Japan
