= Nishimuta Station =

Railway station in Chikugo, Fukuoka Prefecture, Japan

JB 19 Nishimuta Station 西牟田駅
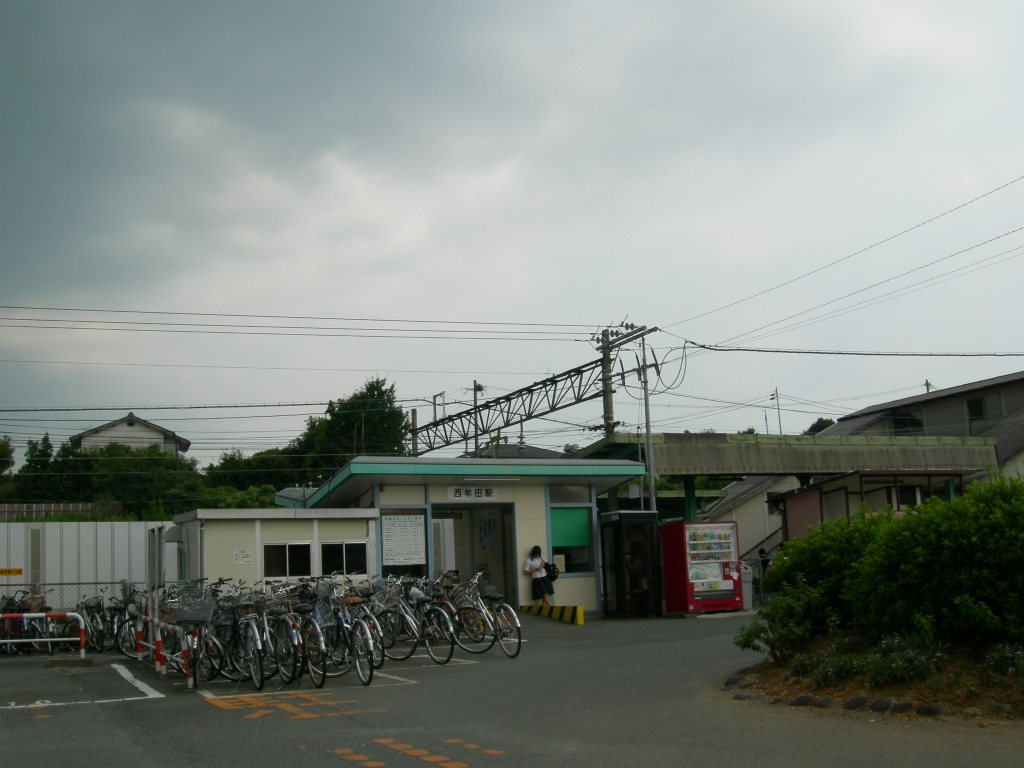
- Nishimuta Station in 2006

General information
- Location: Nishimuta, Chikugo-shi, Fukuoka-ken 833-005; Japan
- Coordinates: 33°14′48″N 130°30′03″E
- Operator: JR Kyushu
- Line: JB Kagoshima Main Line
- Distance: 122.6 km from Mojikō
- Platforms: 2 side platforms
- Tracks: 2

Construction
- Structure type: At grade
- Accessible: No - platforms linked by footbridge

Other information
- Status: Unstaffed
- Website: Official website

History
- Opened: 17 May 1937

Passengers
- FY2020: 329 daily
- Rank: 265th (among JR Kyushu stations)

Services
Preceding station	JR Kyushu	Following station
Hainuzuka towards Kagoshima	Kagoshima Main Line	Araki towards Mojikō
Location
- Location within Fukuoka Prefecture Location within Japan

Nishimuta Station (西牟田駅, Nishimuta-eki) is a passenger railway station located in the city of Chikugo, Fukuoka Prefecture, Japan. It is operated by JR Kyushu.

== Lines ==
The station is served by the Kagoshima Main Line and is located 122.6 km from the starting point of the line at Mojiko.

== Layout ==
The station, which is unstaffed, consists of two opposed side platforms serving two tracks at grade. The station building is a modern prefabricated structure and houses a small waiting area, an automatic ticket vending machine, and Sugoca card readers. Access to the opposite side platform is by means of a footbridge. The elevated tracks of the Kyushu Shinkansen run next to platform 2, parallel with the tracks.

=== Platforms ===
1	■ JB Kagoshima Main Line	for Kurume, Tosu and Hakata
2	■ JB Kagoshima Main Line	for Ōmuta, Kumamoto and Yatsushiro

== History ==
The station was opened by Japanese Government Railways (JGR) on 17 May 1937 as an additional station on the existing Kagoshima Main Line track. With the privatization of Japanese National Railways (JNR), the successor of JGR, on 1 April 1987, JR Kyushu took over control of the station. The station became unstaffed in 2016.

== Passenger statistics ==
In fiscal 2020, the station was used by an average of 329 passengers daily (boarding passengers only), and it ranked 265th among the busiest stations of JR Kyushu.

== Surrounding area ==
The station is located at the northern end of Chikugo City, and the city border with Kurume City runs in front of the station.

- Chikugo City Chikugokita Elementary School
- Kyushu Otani Junior College

== See also ==
- List of railway stations in Japan
