= Mizuta Tenmangū =

Shinto shrine in Fukuoka Prefecture, Japan

Mizuta Tenman-gū
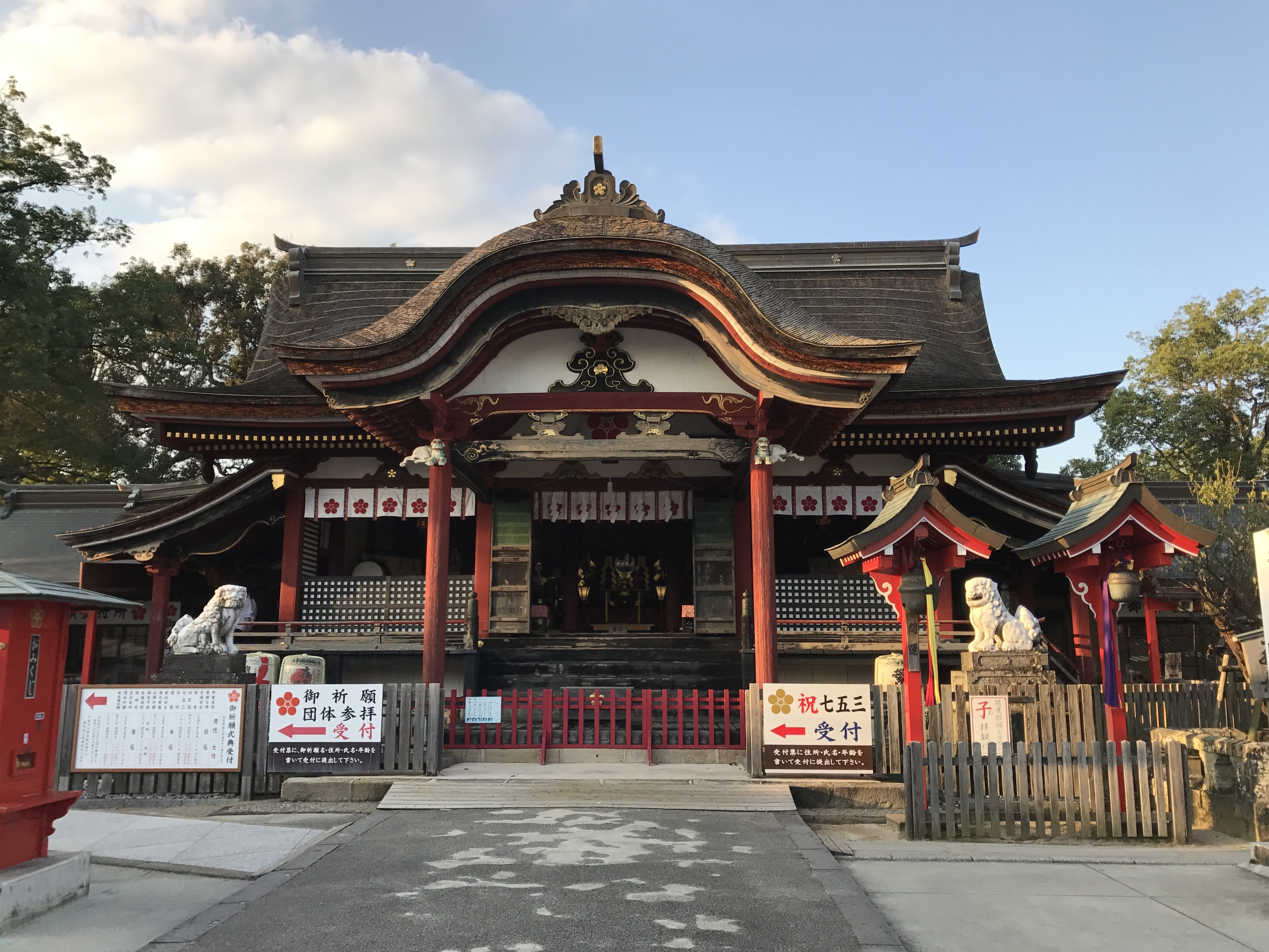
- The haiden

- Mizuta Tenman-gū Mizuta Tenmangū (Japan)

Religion
- Affiliation: Shinto
- Deity: Sugawara no Michizane / Tenjin
- Type: Tenman-gū

Location
- Location: 62-1 Mizuta, Chikugo-shi, Fukuoka-ken
- Interactive map of Mizuta Tenman-gū
- Coordinates: 33°11′55.1″N 130°29′8.4″E

Architecture
- Style: Nagare-zukuri
- Founder: Sugawara Tamenaga
- Established: 1226

Website
- Official website

Mizuta Tenmangū (水田天満宮) is a Shinto shrine in Chikugo, Fukuoka Prefecture, Japan.

== Overview ==
According to the shrine's legend, it was founded in 1226 by Sugawara Tamenaga, a descendant of Sugawara Michizane and the head of the Sugawara clan, with the authorization of Emperor Go-Horikawa. The surrounding was a shōen landed estate belonging to Dazaifu Tenman-gū. In the Edo period, Chikugo Province was divided between Kurume Domain and Yanagawa Domain, and the shrine received support from both the Tachibana clan of Yanagawa and the Arima clan of Kurume. In the Bakumatsu period, the sonnō-jōi supporter Maki Yasuomi sought refuge from Tokugawa shogunate authorities by sheltering in the house of his brother, who was a priest at this shrine. The building still exists, and is a Fukuoka Prefectural Historic Site.

The honden of the shrine and a stone torii gate were rebuilt in 1672. Both were designated Fukuoka Prefectural cultural property in 1961.

== See also ==
- Tenman-gū
- Dazaifu Tenman-gū
