= Chikugo, Fukuoka =

Chikugo 筑後市
- City
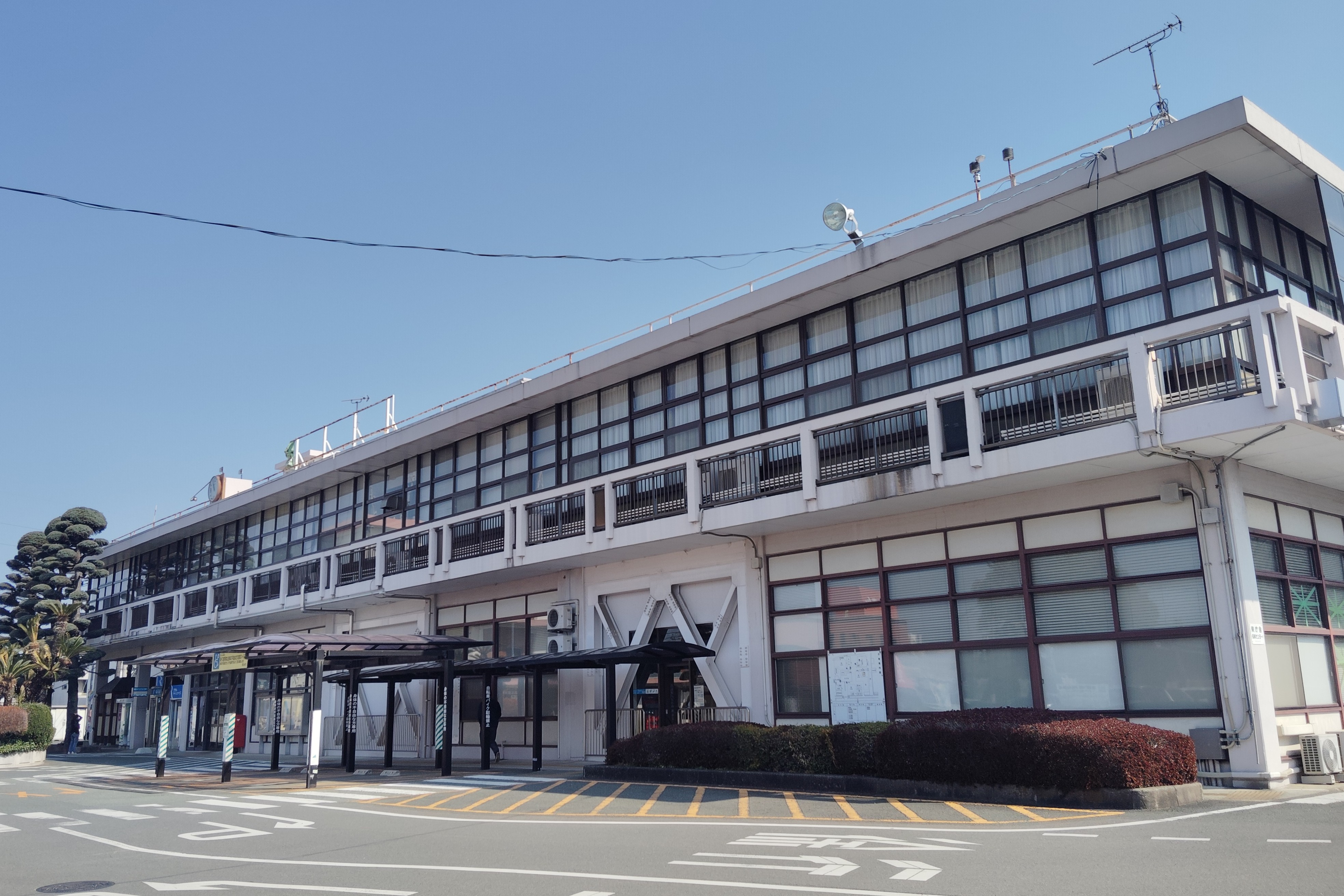
- Chikugo city hall

- Flag Emblem
- Interactive map of Chikugo
- Location in Japan
- Coordinates: 33°12′44″N 130°30′07″E
- Country: Japan
- Region: Kyushu
- Prefecture: Fukuoka Prefecture

Government
  - Mayor: Seiichi Nakamura (since December 2009)

Area
  - Total: 41.78 km^{2} (16.13 sq mi)

Population (January 31, 2024)
  - Total: 49,259
  - Density: 1,179/km^{2} (3,054/sq mi)
- Time zone: UTC+09:00 (JST)
- City hall address: 898 Oji Yamanoi, Chikugo-shi, Fukuoka-ken 833-8601
- Website: Official website
- Symbols
- Flower: Camellia sasanqua
- Tree: Cinnamomum camphora

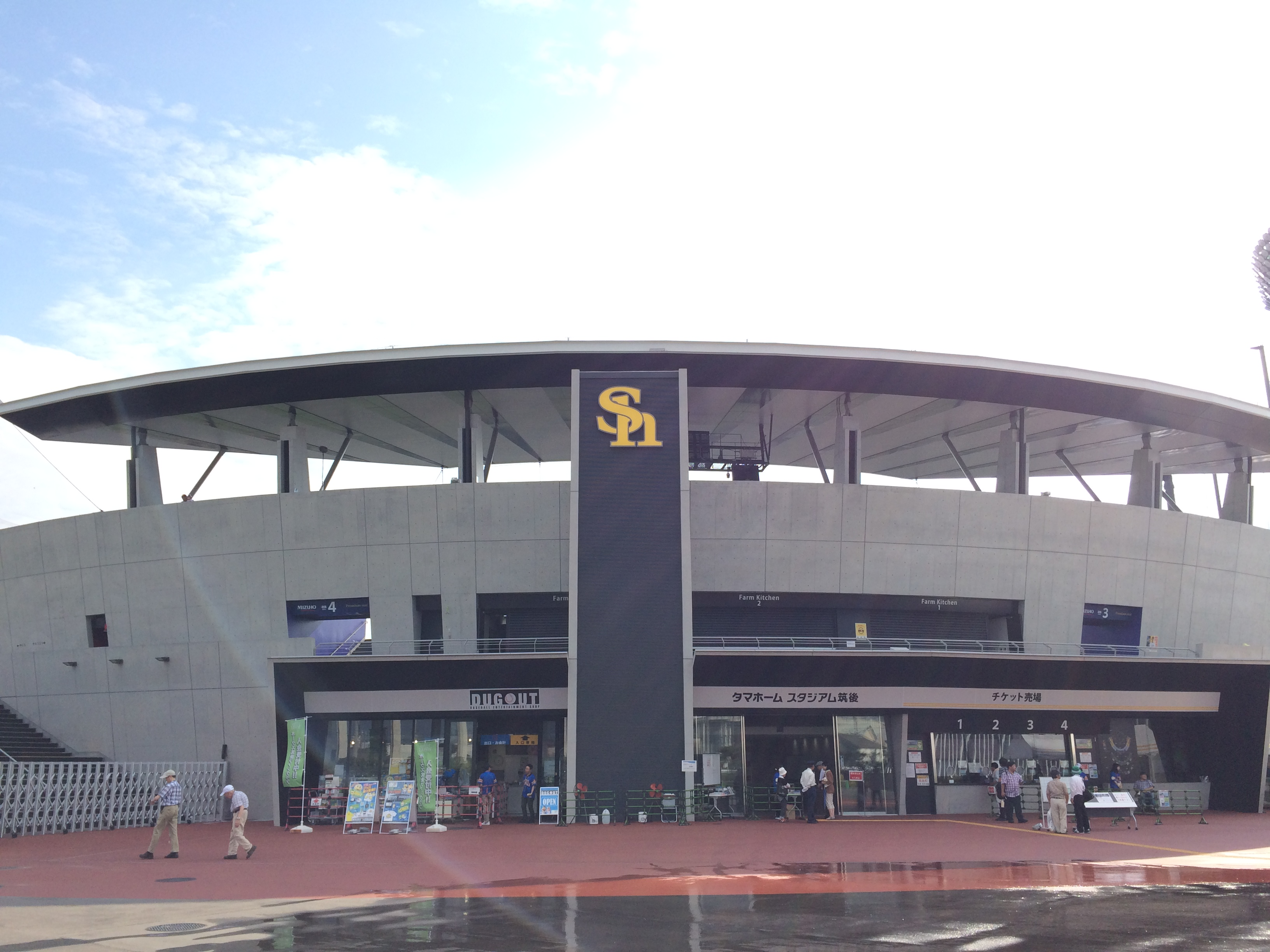
HAWKS Baseball Stadium

Chikugo (筑後市, Chikugo-shi; Japanese pronunciation: [c̟͡ɕi̥.kɯ̈̀.ɡò̞, -kɯ̈̀.ŋò̞, -kɯ̈́.ɡò̞, -kɯ̈́.ŋò̞, -kɯ̈́.ɡó̞(.ɕì), -kɯ̈́.ŋó̞(.ɕì)]) is a city located in Fukuoka Prefecture, Japan. As of 31 January 2024, the city had an estimated population of 49,259 in 20980 households, and a population density of 1200 persons per km^{2}. The total area of the city is 41.78 km^{2} (16.13 sq mi).

== Geography ==
Chikugo is located in the center of the Chikugo Plain in southern Fukuoka Prefecture. It is approximately 45 minutes by train from Fukuoka City.

=== Neighboring municipalities ===
Fukuoka Prefecture

- Hirokawa
- Kurume
- Miyama
- Ōki
- Yame
- Yanagawa

=== Climate ===
Chikugo has a humid subtropical climate (Köppen Cfa) characterized by warm summers and cool winters with light to no snowfall. The average annual temperature in Chikugo is 15.8 °C. The average annual rainfall is 1946 mm with September as the wettest month. The temperatures are highest on average in August, at around 26.7 °C, and lowest in January, at around 5.3 °C.

=== Demographics ===
Per Japanese census data, the population of Chikugo is as shown below

Historical population
Year	Pop.	±%
1960	40,479	—
1970	38,688	−4.4%
1980	41,698	+7.8%
1990	43,835	+5.1%
2000	47,348	+8.0%
2010	48,512	+2.5%
2020	48,827	+0.6%

== History ==
The area of Chikugo was part of ancient Chikugo Province. During the Edo Period the area was mostly under the control of Fukuoka Domain with smaller portions under Yanagawa Domain. After the Meiji restoration, the villages of Hainuzuka, Mizuta, Shimotsuma, Futagawa, and Furukawa were established on May 1, 1889 with the creation of the modern municipalities system. Mizuta annexed Shimotsuma and Futagawa in 1908. On January 1, 1915, Hainuzuka was raised to town status. On April 1, 1954, Hainuzuka merged with Mizuta and Furukawa to form the city of Chikugo

== Government ==
Chikugo has a mayor-council form of government with a directly elected mayor and a unicameral city council of 17 members. Chikugo contributes one member to the Fukuoka Prefectural Assembly. In terms of national politics, the city is part of the Fukuoka 7th district of the lower house of the Diet of Japan.

== Economy ==
The economy of Chikugo is overwhelmingly agricultural.

== Education ==
Chikugo has 11 public elementary schools and three public junior high schools operated by the city government and two public high schools operated by the Fukuoka Prefectural Board of Education. The prefecture also operates one special education school for the handicapped. The Kyushu Otani Junior College is located in Chikugo.

== Transportation ==
=== Railways ===
JR Kyushu - Kyushu Shinkansen

Chikugo-Funagoya

JR Kyushu - Kagoshima Main Line

JB Nishimuta - Hainuzuka - Chikugo-Funagoya

=== Highways ===
- Kyushu Expressway
- National Route 209
- National Route 442

== Local attractions ==
- Mizuta Tenmangū
- Sekijinsan Kofun, National Historic Site

== Notable people from Chikugo ==
- Ken Tanaka, actor

== See also ==
- Chikugo Province
