= Shin-Ōmuta Station =

Railway station in Ōmuta, Fukuoka Prefecture, Japan

Shin-Ōmuta Station 新大牟田駅
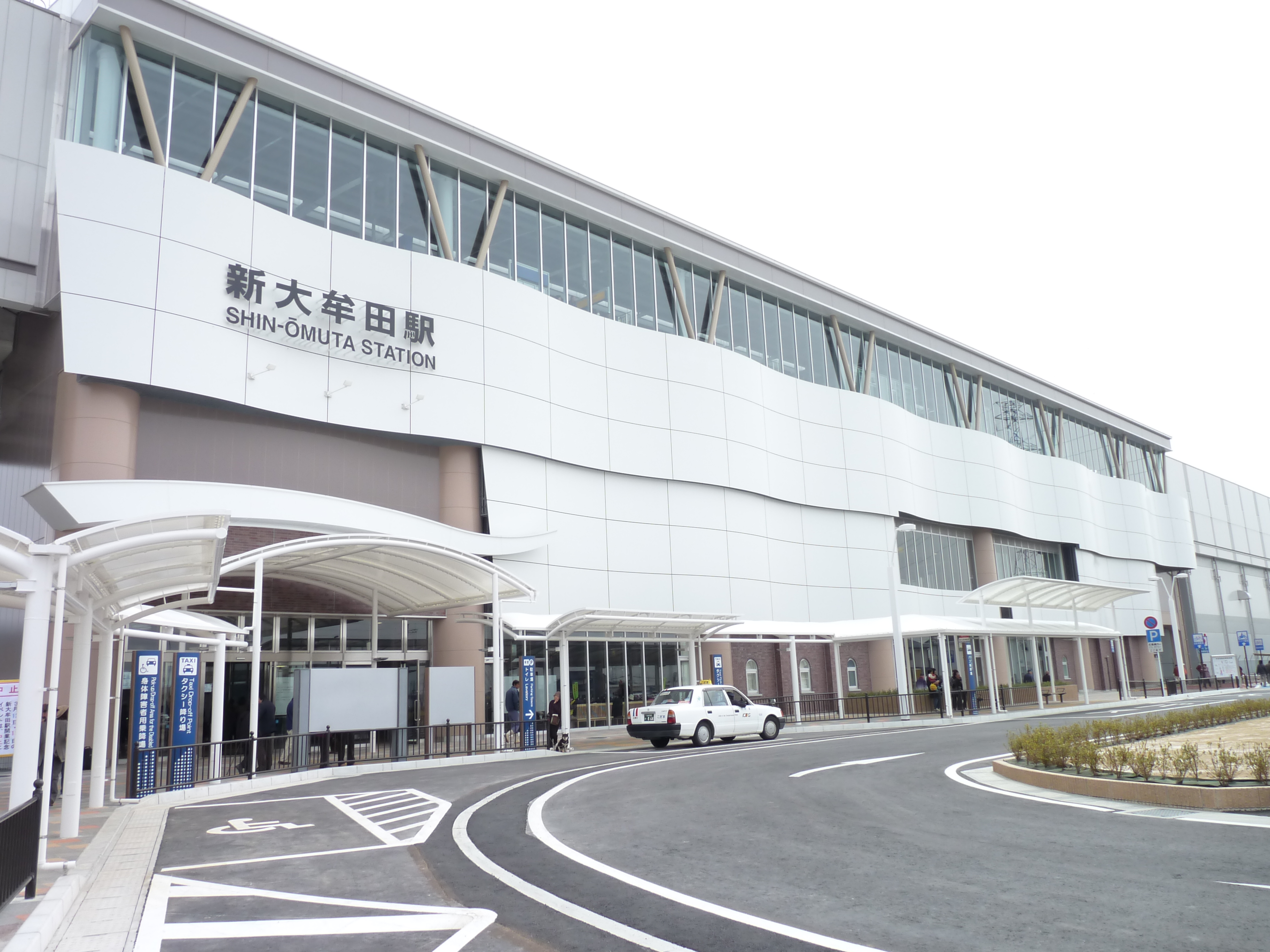
- Shin-Ōmuta Station

General information
- Location: 2509-3 Iwamoto, Ōmuta-shi, Fukuoka-ken 837-0913; Japan
- Coordinates: 33°04′16″N 130°29′20″E
- Operator: JR Kyushu
- Line: Kyūshū Shinkansen
- Distance: 69.3 km (43.1 mi) from Hakata
- Platforms: 2 side platforms
- Tracks: 2

Construction
- Structure type: Elevated

History
- Opened: 12 March 2011; 15 years ago

Passengers
- FY2021: 389

Services
Preceding station	JR Kyushu	Following station
Shin-Tamana towards Kagoshima-Chūō	Kyūshū Shinkansen Sakura Tsubame	Chikugo-Funagoya towards Hakata
Location
- Location within Fukuoka Prefecture Location within Japan

Shin-Ōmuta Station (新大牟田駅, Shin-Ōmuta-eki) is a passenger railway station located in the city of Ōmuta, Fukuoka, Japan. It is operated by the Kyushu Railway Company (JR Kyushu).

== Lines ==
Shin-Ōmuta Station is served by the Kyushu Shinkansen and is 59.3 km from the starting point of the line at Hakata and 691.6 kilometers from Shin-Osaka.

== Layout ==
The station consists of two elevated side platforms and two tracks. There are no passing lines, and platform screen doors are installed for safety. The station building has a three-story structure, with brick-style tiles on the first floor inspired by the heritage of modernization, and gently waving exterior walls on the second and third floors, expressing the wind blowing into the future.The ticket gate and waiting room are on the 1st floor, and the platforms are on the 3rd floor. On the opposite side (north side) of the free passageway from the ticket gate and waiting room is the Shin-Omuta Station Tourist Plaza.

== Platforms ==
11	■ Kyūshū Shinkansen	for Hakata and Shin-Ōsaka
12	■ Kyūshū Shinkansen	for Kumamoto and Kagoshima-Chūō

== History ==
The station was opened on 12 March 2011.

== Passenger statistics ==
In fiscal 2020, the station was used by an average of 364 passengers daily (boarding passengers only).

== Surrounding area ==
- Omuta City Yoshino Elementary School

== See also ==
- Nishi Kyushu Shinkansen#History
- List of railway stations in Japan
