= Hainuzuka Station =

Railway station in Chikugo, Fukuoka Prefecture, Japan

JB 20 Hainuzuka Station 羽犬塚駅
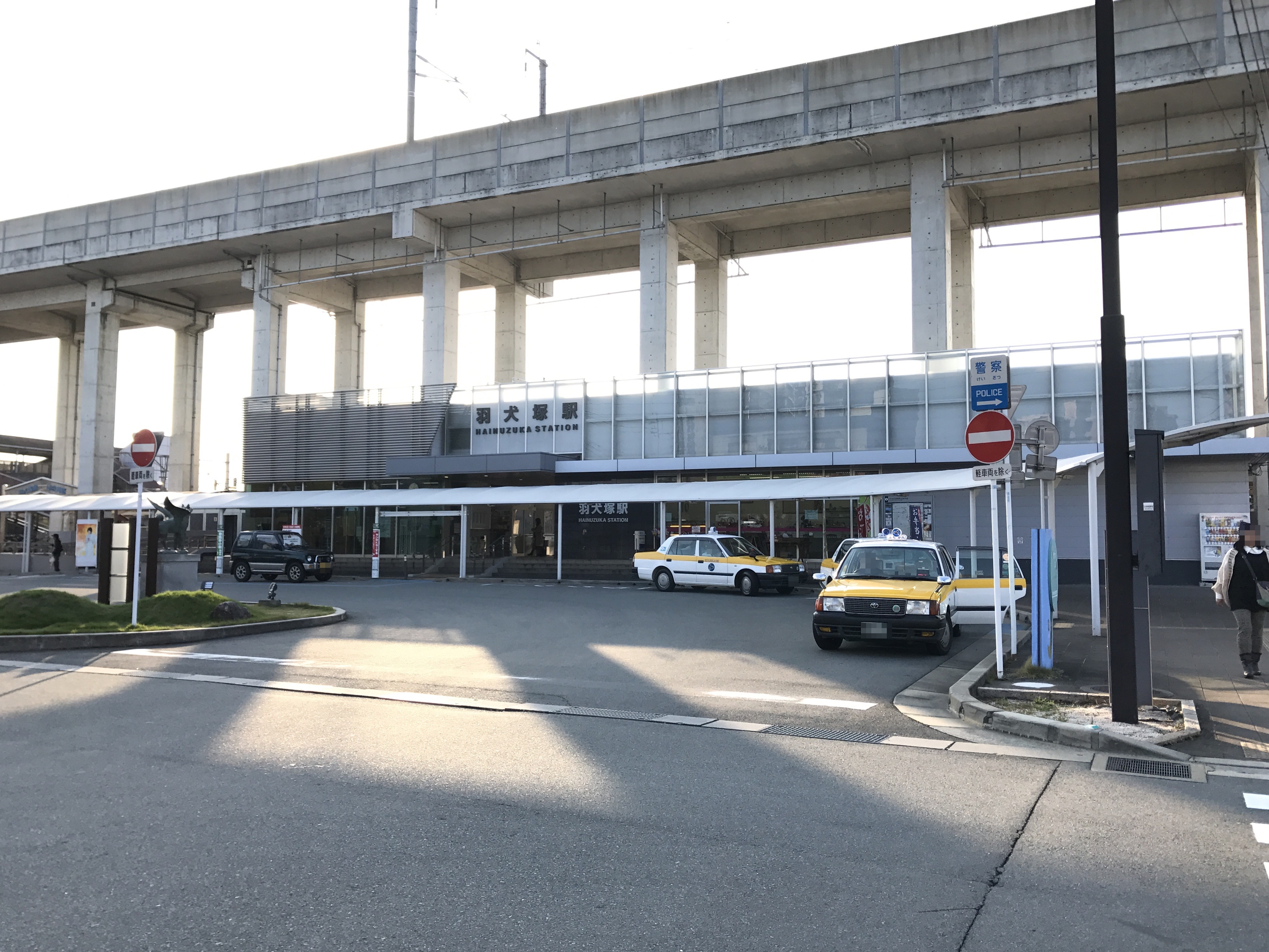
- Hainuzuka Station in 2016

General information
- Location: 178-3 Yamanoi, Chikugo-shi, Fukuoka-ken 833-0031; Japan
- Coordinates: 33°12′33″N 130°29′51″E
- Operator: JR Kyushu
- Line: JB Kagoshima Main Line
- Distance: 126.1 km from Mojikō
- Platforms: 1 side + 1 island platforms
- Tracks: 3

Construction
- Structure type: At grade
- Accessible: Yes - footbridge equipped with elevators

Other information
- Status: Staffed ticket window (Midori no Madoguchi) (outsourced)
- Website: Official website

History
- Opened: 1 April 1891

Passengers
- FY2020: 2205 daily
- Rank: 63rd (among JR Kyushu stations)

Services
Preceding station	JR Kyushu	Following station
Chikugo-Funagoya towards Kagoshima	Kagoshima Main Line	Nishimuta towards Mojikō
Location
- Location within Fukuoka Prefecture Location within Japan

Hainuzuka Station (羽犬塚駅, Hainuzuka-eki) is a passenger railway station located in the city of Chikugo, Fukuoka Prefecture, Japan. It is operated by JR Kyushu.

== Lines ==
The station is served by the Kagoshima Main Line and is located 126.1 km from the starting point of the line at Mojiko.

== Layout ==
The station consists of a side platform and an island platform serving three tracks at grade. The station building is built under the elevated tracks of the Kyushu Shinkansen which does not stop at the station. It houses a waiting room, a staffed ticket window and a mini-convenience store. Access to the island platform is by means of a footbridge which is equipped with elevators.

Management of the station has been outsourced to the JR Kyushu Tetsudou Eigyou Co., a wholly owned subsidiary of JR Kyushu specialising in station services. It staffs the ticket counter which is equipped with a Midori no Madoguchi facility.

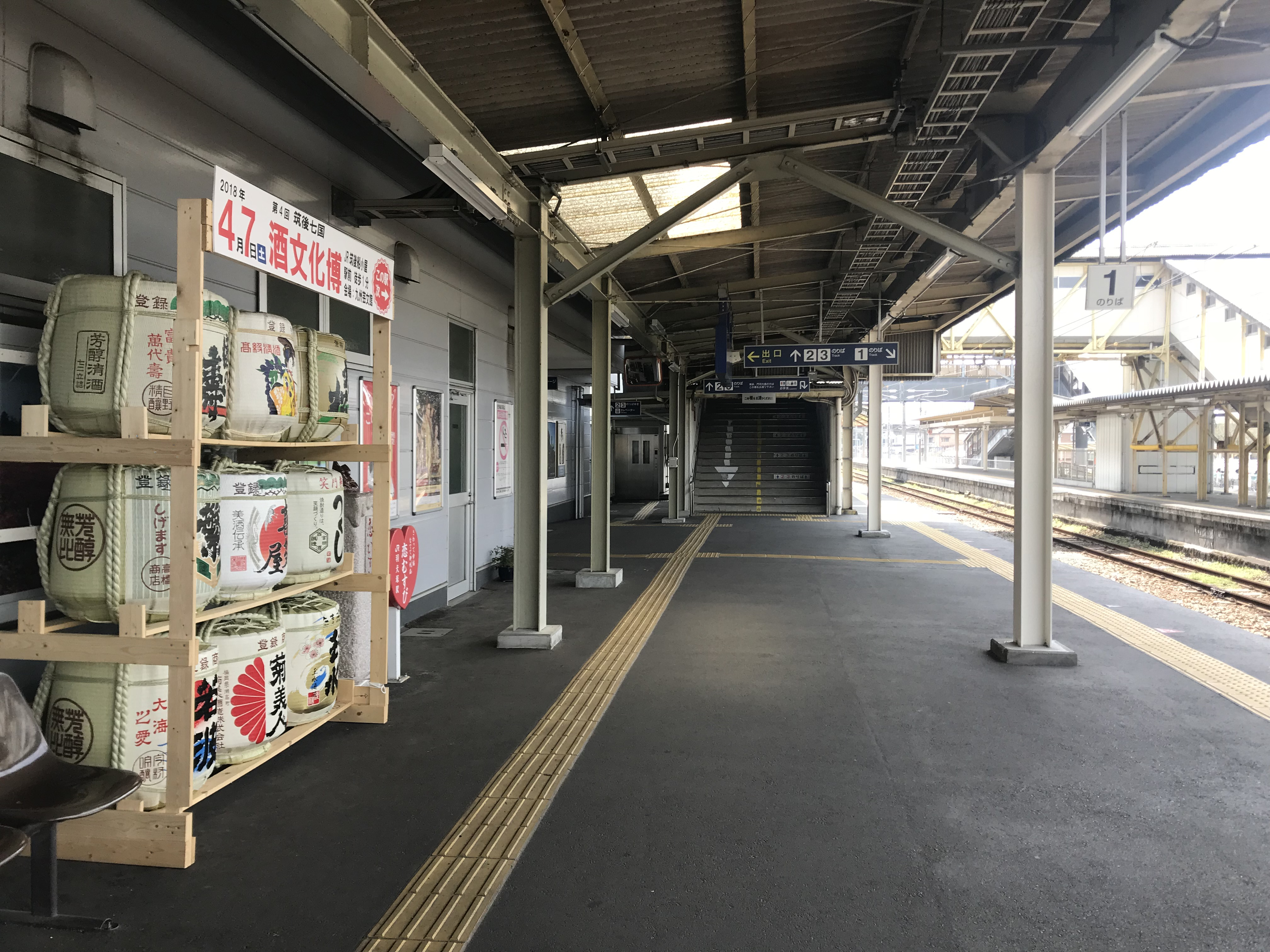
A view of the station platforms and tracks. Note the elevator door in the distance on the left.

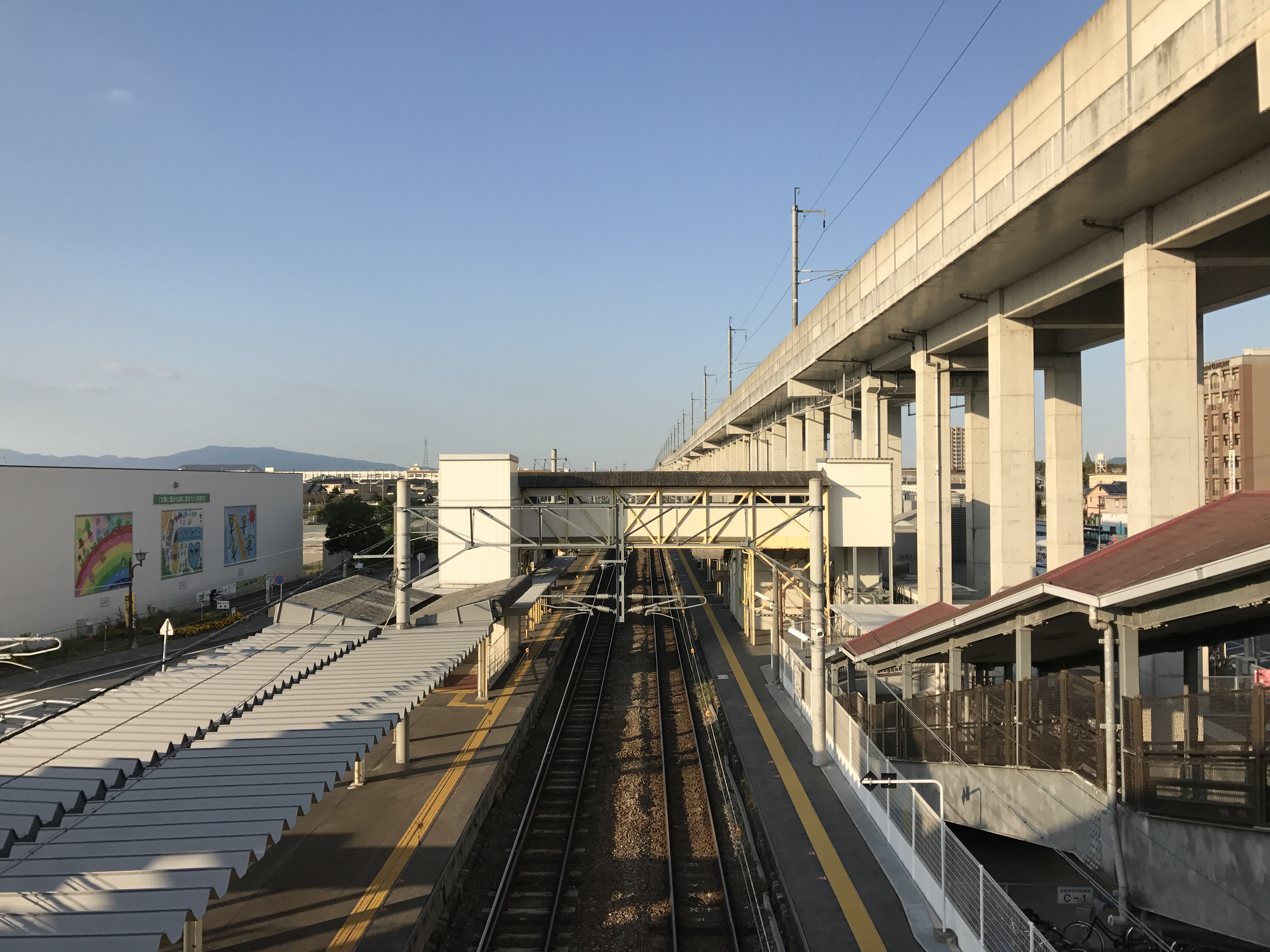
Another view of the platforms. Note there are two footbridges.

== Adjacent stations ==
←	Service	→
Kagoshima Main Line
JB 19 Nishimuta	Local	JB 21 Chikugo-Funagoya
JB 19 Nishimuta	Rapid	JB 21 Chikugo-Funagoya

== History ==
The privately run Kyushu Railway had opened a stretch of track between Hakata and the (now closed) Chitosegawa temporary stop on 11 December 1889. After several phases of expansion northwards and southwards, by February 1891, the line stretched from Kurosaki south to Kurume. In the next phase of expansion, the track was extended south to Takase (now Tamana) opening as the new southern terminus on 1 April 1891. Hainuzuka was opened on the same day as one of several intermediate stations on the new stretch of track. When the Kyushu Railway was nationalized on 1 July 1907, Japanese Government Railways (JGR) took over control of the station. On 12 October 1909, the station became part of the Hitoyoshi Main Line and then on 21 November 1909, part of the Kagoshima Main Line. With the privatization of Japanese National Railways (JNR), the successor of JGR, on 1 April 1987, JR Kyushu took over control of the station.

== Passenger statistics ==
In fiscal 2020, the station was used by an average of 2205 passengers daily (boarding passengers only), and it ranked 63rd among the busiest stations of JR Kyushu.

== Surrounding area ==
- Chikugo City Hall
- Fukuoka Prefectural Yame High School
- Fukuoka Prefectural Yame Technical High School

== See also ==
- List of railway stations in Japan
