= Kyushu Otani Junior College =

Coordinates: 33°14′28″N 130°30′19″E

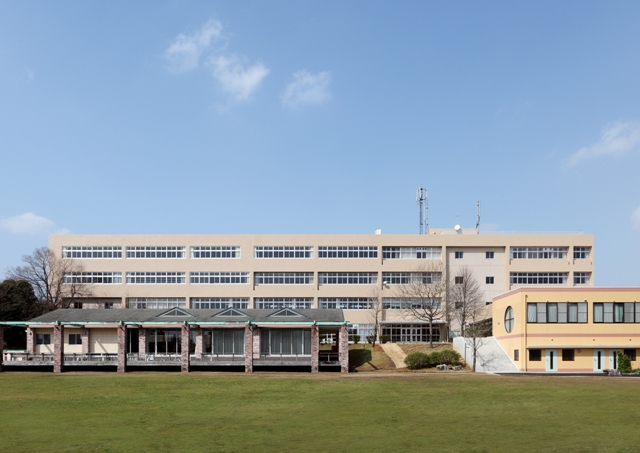
Kyushu Otani Junior College

Kyushu Otani Junior College (九州大谷短期大学, Kyūshū ōtani tanki daigaku) is a private junior college in Chikugo, Fukuoka, Japan, established in 1970. The predecessor of the school was founded in 1965.
