= List of Fukuoka City Subway stations =

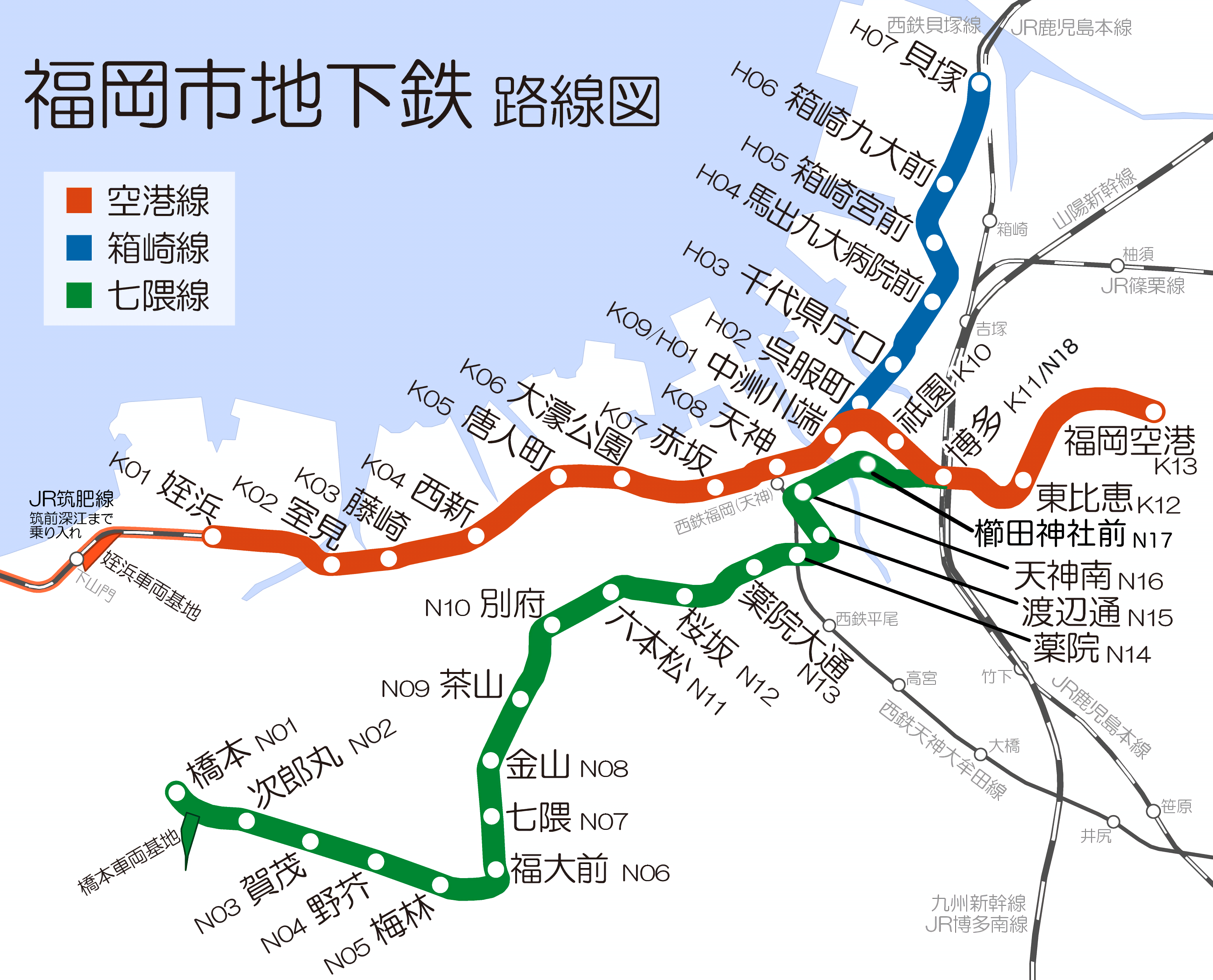
Fukuoka City Subway network map

There are currently 36 stations on the Fukuoka City Subway network operated by the Fukuoka City Transportation Bureau. The first section to open was the Airport Line, which began operation in July 1981 between Muromi Station and Tenjin Station. As of 2025, the network extends 31.4 km (19.5 mi) and consists of three lines, Airport, Hakozaki, and Nanakuma serving several wards across the city of Fukuoka.

== Stations ==
=== Airport Line ===
No.	Station name	Japanese	Distance (km)	Transfers	Location
K01	Meinohama	姪浜	0	Chikuhi Line (JK01) (through service)	Nishi
K02	Muromi	室見	1.5		Sawara
K03	Fujisaki	藤崎	2.3		Sawara
K04	Nishijin	西新	3.4		Sawara
K05	Tōjinmachi	唐人町	4.6		Chūō
K06	Ōhorikōen	大濠公園	5.4		Chūō
K07	Akasaka	赤坂	6.5		Chūō
K08	Tenjin	天神	7.3	Nanakuma Line (Tenjin-minami (N16)); Tenjin-Ōmuta Line (Nishitetsu Fukuoka (Tenjin) )	Chūō
K09	Nakasu-Kawabata	中洲川端	8.1	Hakozaki Line (H01) (through service)	Hakata
K10	Gion	祇園	9.1		Hakata
K11	Hakata	博多	9.8	Kyushu Shinkansen, Kagoshima Main Line, Sasaguri Line (Fukuhoku Yutaka Line); Hakata Minami Line, Sanyō Shinkansen Nanakuma Line (N18)	Hakata
K12	Higashi-Hie	東比恵	11.0		Hakata
K13	Fukuoka Airport	福岡空港	13.1		Hakata

=== Hakozaki Line ===
No.	Station name	Japanese	Distance (km)	Transfers	Location	
H01	Nakasu-Kawabata	中洲川端	0.0	Airport Line (through service)	Hakata	Fukuoka, Fukuoka
H02	Gofukumachi	呉服町	0.5		Hakata	Fukuoka, Fukuoka
H03	Chiyo-Kenchōguchi	千代県庁口	1.2		Hakata	Fukuoka, Fukuoka
H04	Maidashi-Kyūdai-byōin-mae	馬出九大病院前	2.1		Higashi	Fukuoka, Fukuoka
H05	Hakozaki-Miyamae	箱崎宮前	2.9		Higashi	Fukuoka, Fukuoka
H06	Hakozaki-Kyūdai-mae	箱崎九大前	3.7		Higashi	Fukuoka, Fukuoka
H07	Kaizuka	貝塚	4.7	Nishitetsu Kaizuka Line	Higashi	Fukuoka, Fukuoka

=== Nanakuma Line ===
No.	Station	Japanese	Distance (km)	Transfers	Location
N01	Hashimoto	橋本	0		Nishi
N02	Jirōmaru	次郎丸	1.0		Sawara
N03	Kamo	賀茂	1.7		Sawara
N04	Noke	野芥	2.6		Sawara
N05	Umebayashi	梅林	3.4		Jōnan
N06	Fukudaimae	福大前	4.3		Jōnan
N07	Nanakuma	七隈	4.9		Jōnan
N08	Kanayama	金山	5.7		Jōnan
N09	Chayama	茶山	6.5		Jōnan
N10	Befu	別府	7.5		Jōnan
N11	Ropponmatsu	六本松	8.3		Chūō
N12	Sakurazaka	桜坂	9.2		Chūō
N13	Yakuin-ōdōri	薬院大通	10.2		Chūō
N14	Yakuin	薬院	10.8	Nishitetsu Tenjin Ōmuta Line (T-02)	Chūō
N15	Watanabe-dōri	渡辺通	11.3		Chūō
N16	Tenjin-Minami	天神南	12.0	Airport Line (Tenjin); Nishitetsu Tenjin Ōmuta Line (Fukuoka)	Chūō
N17	Kushida Shrine	櫛田神社前	13.0		Chūō
N18	Hakata	博多	13.6	Airport Line; Kyushu Shinkansen, Kagoshima Main Line, Sasaguri Line (Fukuhoku Yutaka Line); Hakata Minami Line, Sanyō Shinkansen	Hakata
