= Fukuoka Subway 3000 series =

Japanese train type

Fukuoka Subway 3000/3000A series
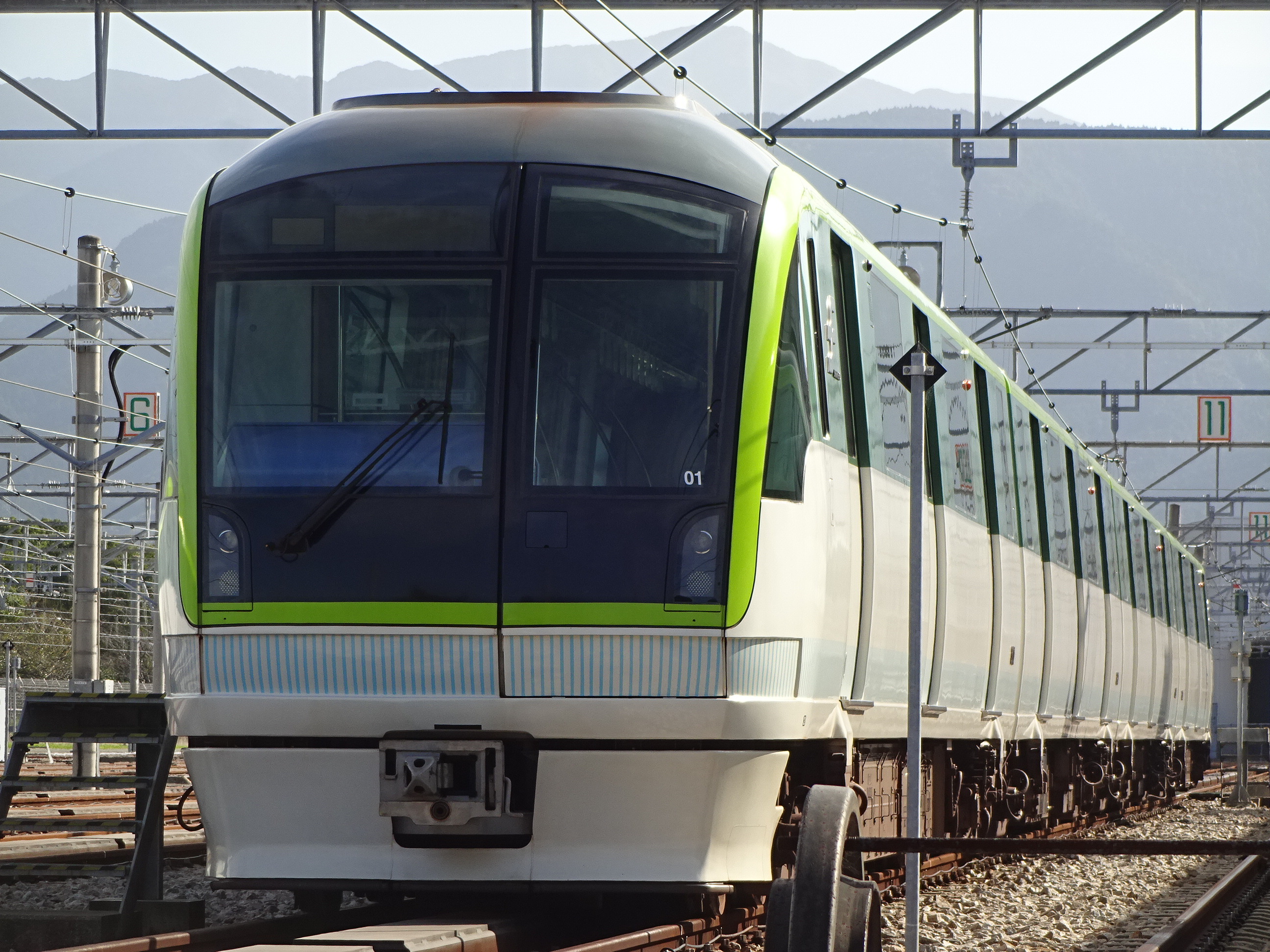
- 3000 series set 01 at Hashimoto Depot in October 2015
- Manufacturer: Hitachi Rail
- Designer: Alexander Neumeister
- Family name: Hitachi A-train
- Entered service: 3 February 2005
- Number under construction: 16 vehicles (4 sets)
- Number in service: 84 vehicles (21 sets)
- Formation: 4 cars per trainset
- Capacity: 378
- Operator: Fukuoka City Transportation Bureau
- Line served: Nanakuma Line

Specifications
- Car body construction: Aluminium alloy
- Car length: 16.750 m (54 ft 11.4 in) (end cars); 16.500 m (54 ft 1.6 in) (intermediate cars)
- Width: 2.490 m (8 ft 2.0 in)
- Height: 3.145 m (10 ft 3.8 in)
- Doors: 3 pairs per side
- Maximum speed: 70 km/h (43 mph)
- Weight: 105.1 t (103.4 long tons; 115.9 short tons)
- Traction system: IGBT–VVVF type VFI-HL-2415B (Hitachi)
- Traction motors: 150 kW (201 hp) MB-7008-A 3-phase AC linear induction motor
- Acceleration: 3.2 km/(h⋅s) (2.0 mph/s)
- Deceleration: Service: 4.0 km/(h⋅s) (2.5 mph/s); Emergency: 4.5 km/(h⋅s) (2.8 mph/s)
- Power supply: 1,500 V DC overhead lines
- Current collection: Pantograph
- Braking systems: Regenerative brake, Brake-by-wire
- Safety systems: ATC, ATO, SR
- Track gauge: 1,435 mm (4 ft 8 1/2 in)

The Fukuoka Subway 3000 series and 3000A series (福岡市交通局3000系・3000A系) are electric multiple unit train types operated by Fukuoka City Transportation Bureau on the Nanakuma Line in Fukuoka, Japan.

== Design ==
The exterior was designed by the German industrial designer Alexander Neumeister. Each side of the cars is equipped with three pairs of doors. The bodyside is white with a small light-green line which runs from the front along the top of the windows. This represents the ridge of Mount Abura (located in Jōnan-ku, Sawara-ku and Minami-ku, Fukuoka). Muromi River (located in Nishi-ku and Sawara-ku, Fukuoka) is represented by a light blue stripe along the bottom of the train. There is an emergency door at each end of the train.

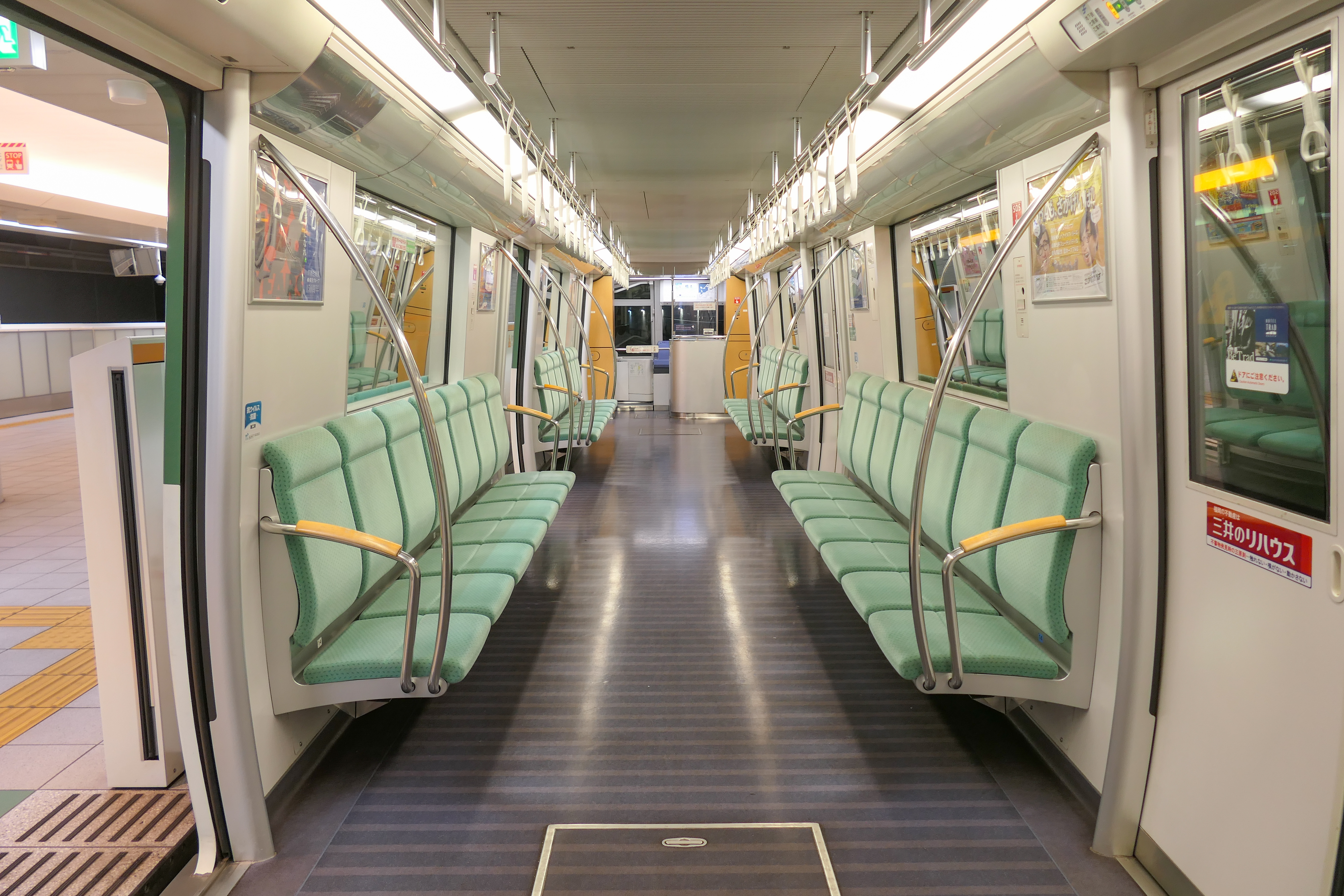
Train interior

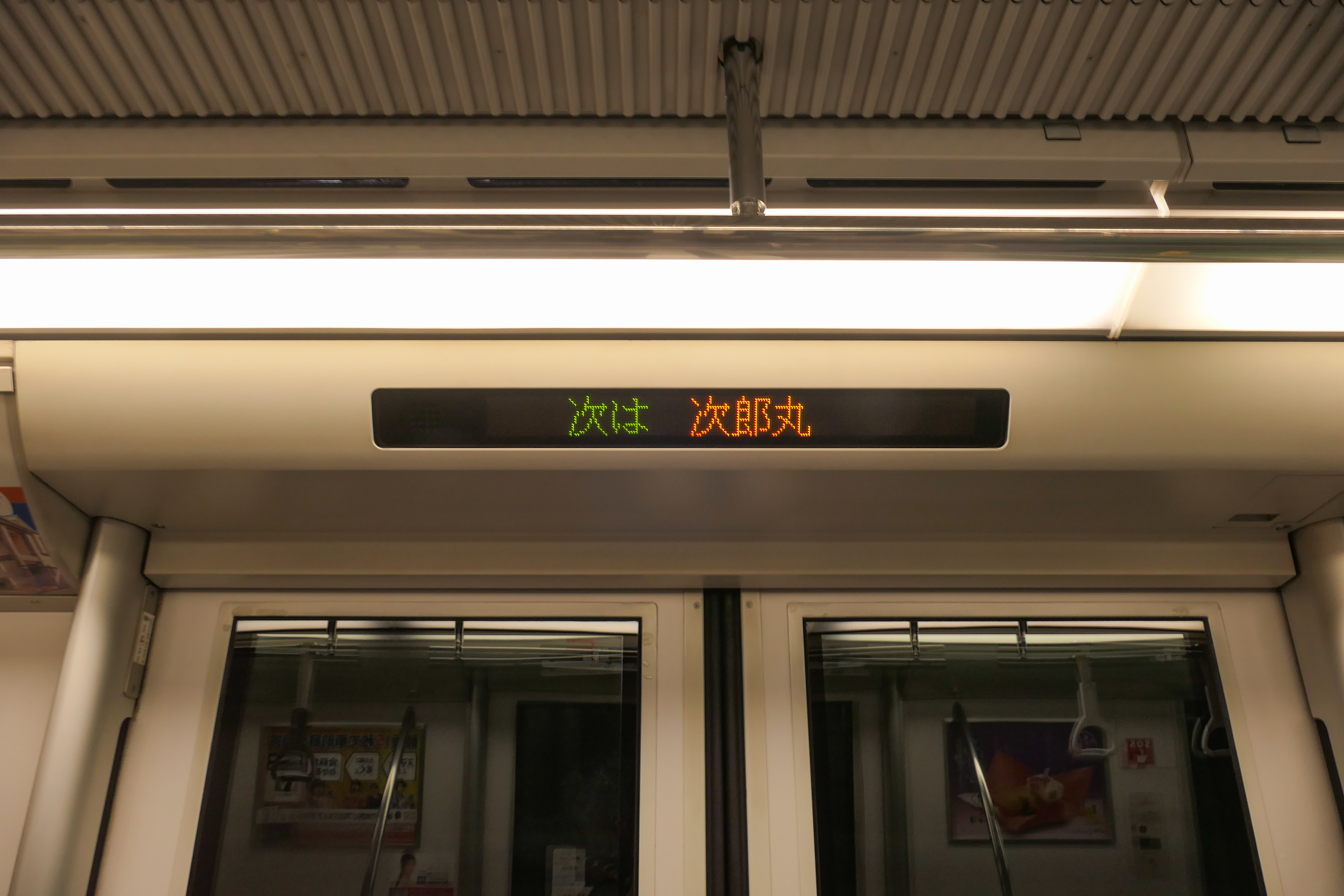
LED passenger information display

== Formation ==
As of February 2024, the 3000 series fleet consists of 21 four-car sets. They are formed as follows with all cars being motored.

| Car No. | 1 | 2 | 3 | 4 |
|---|---|---|---|---|
| Designation | M1c | M1 | M3 | M3c |
| Numbering | 31xx | 32xx | 35xx | 36xx |

== Equipment ==
Trainsets consist of four cars, all motored. The trains are equipped with ATO and can be operated unmanned, but driver-only operation is used. The trains use Insulated-gate bipolar transistor (IGBT), a variable-frequency drive system, and LED train destination indicator panels. All cars are air-conditioned.

== History ==
The original 3000 series was introduced on 3 February 2005 on the newly opened Nanakuma Line between Tenjin-Minami and Hashimoto. Unlike the 1000 series and 2000 series trains operated on the Airport Line and Hakozaki Line, the 3000 series trains are standard gauge (1,435 mm (4 ft 8 1/2 in)) and use linear motor propulsion.

=== 3000A series ===
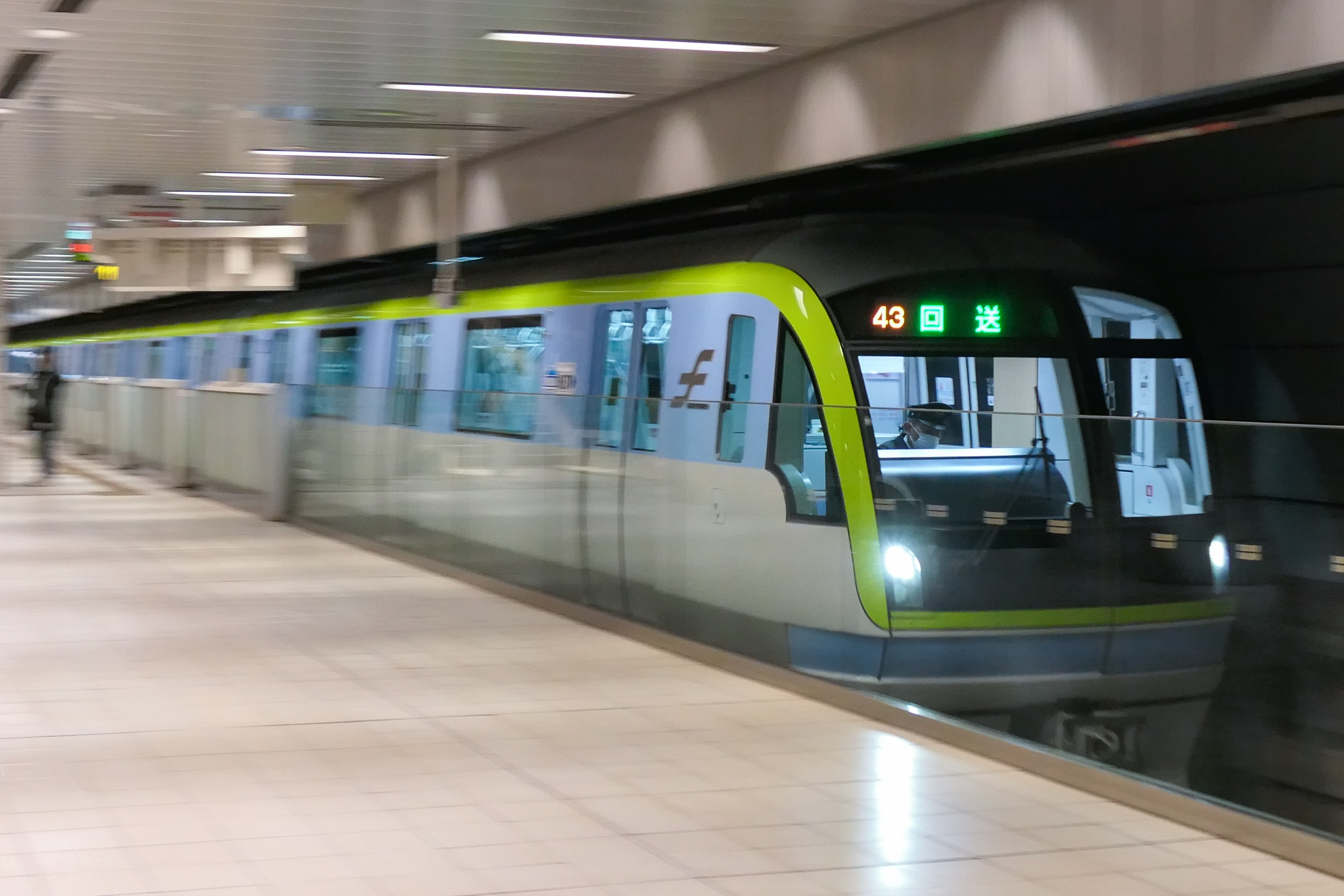
A 3000A series set in December 2022

Four new sets, designated as 3000A series, were ordered in 2021 in anticipation for an increase in service needed when the Nanakuma Line extension from Tenjin-Minami to Hakata would open on 27 March 2023.

Externally, these sets distinguished from older sets by their sky-blue and green livery. Internally, the sets' intermediate cars feature sets of "universal design" priority seats that are 490 millimetres (19.3 in) high, a 60-millimetre (2.4 in) increase over other seats. The Fukuoka City Transportation Bureau reports that the heightened seats are designed to be easier to sit on and stand up from.

The first set was delivered in September 2021, and the 3000A series sets made their first trips in revenue service in February 2022.

Four sets were ordered in 2024 to allow for an increase in frequency from 17 to 21 trains per hour.

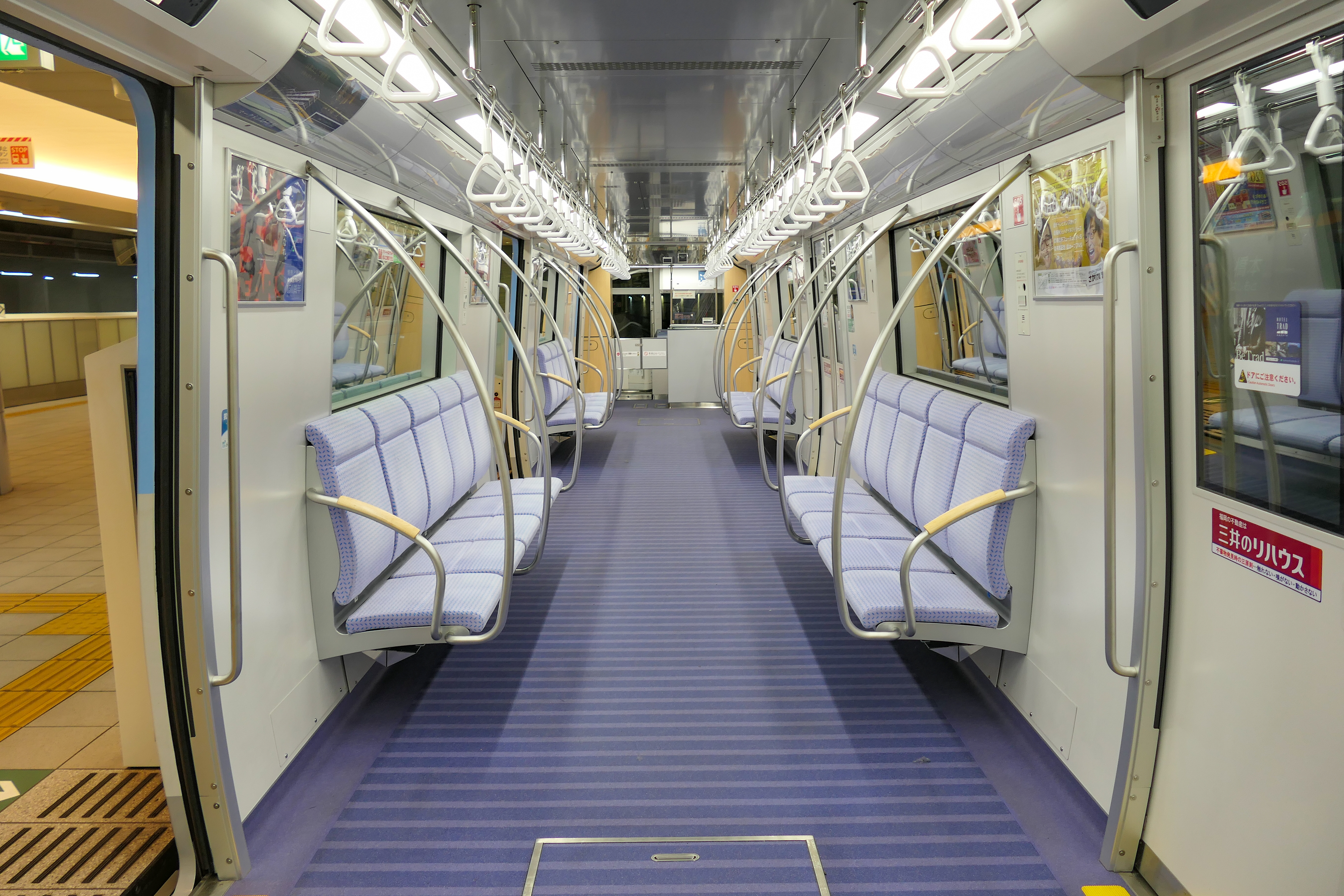
3000A series interior

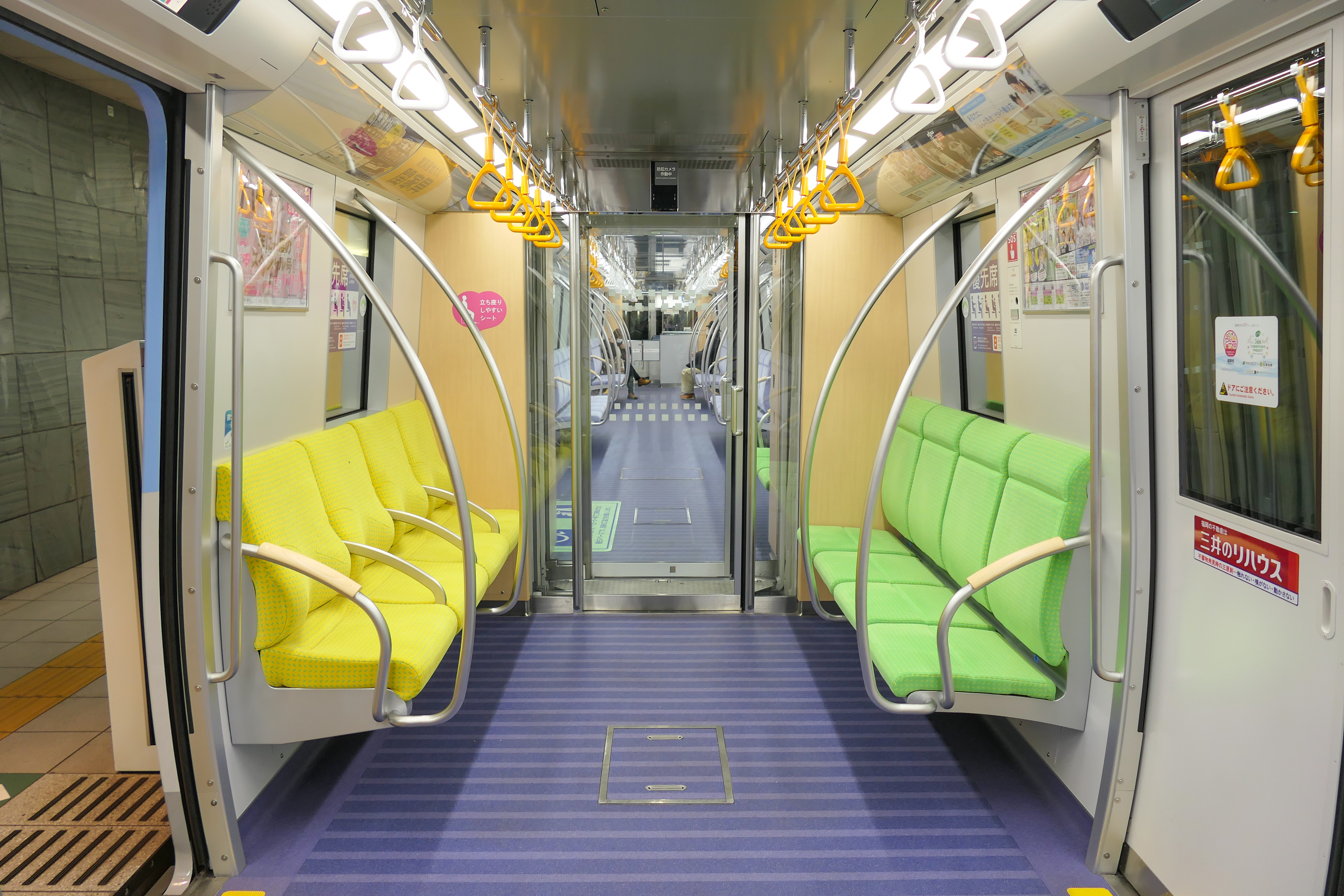
3000A series priority seating. The heightened seats are distinguished by their yellow colour.
