= Umebayashi =

Umebayashi may refer to:

- Shigeru Umebayashi (梅林 茂, born 1951), Japanese composer
- Umebayashi Station (梅林駅) is a subway station on the Fukuoka City Subway Nanakuma Line in Japan
