= Watanabe-dōri Station =

Metro station in Fukuoka, Japan

Coordinates: 33.5841°N 130.4049°E

N15 Watanabe-dōri Station 渡辺通駅
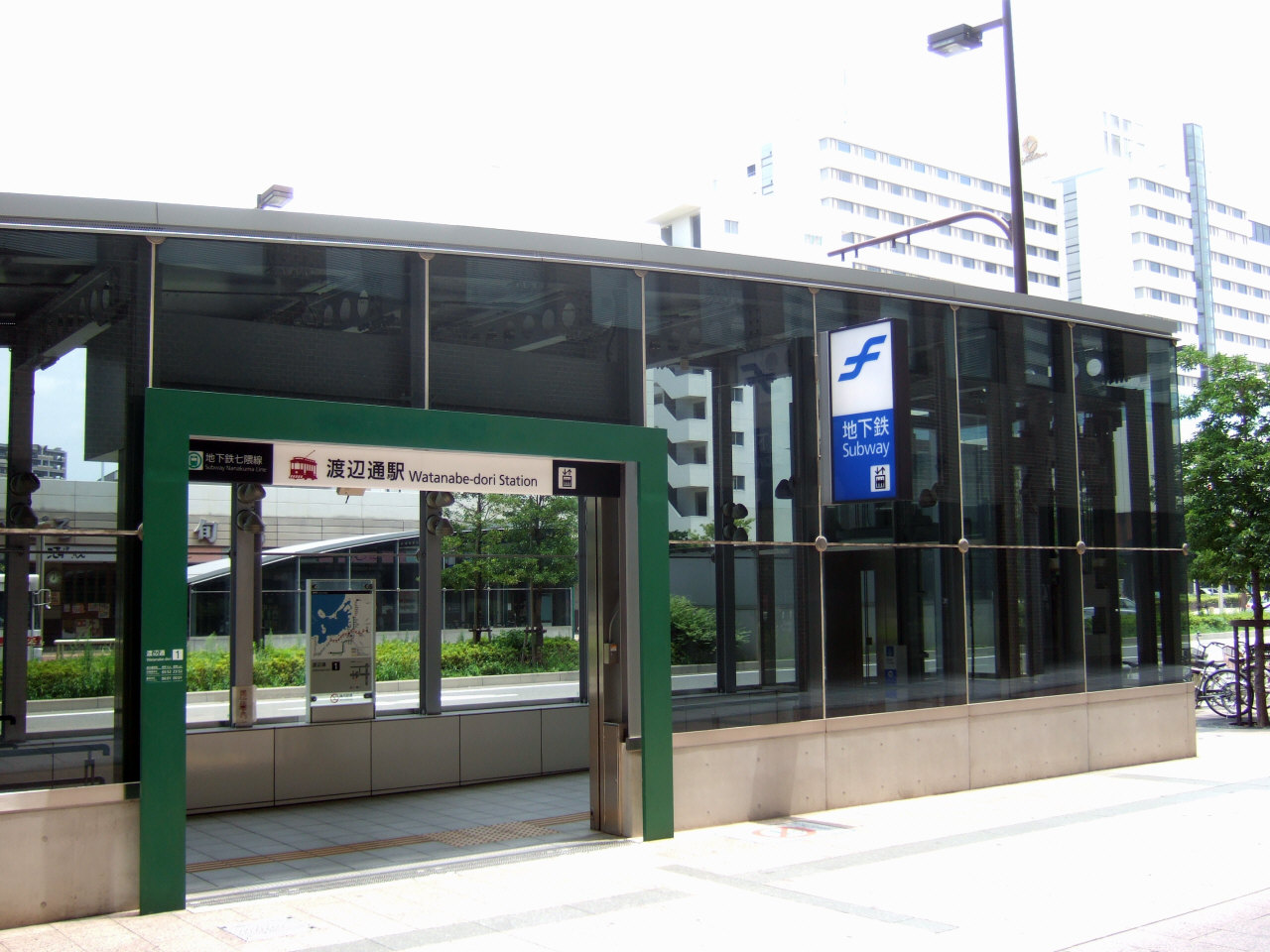

General information
- Location: 1-chōme Watanabe-dōri, Chūō, Fukuoka, Fukuoka （福岡市中央区渡辺通1丁目） Japan
- System: Fukuoka City Subway station
- Operator: Fukuoka City Subway
- Line: Nanakuma Line

Other information
- Station code: N15

History
- Opened: 3 February 2005; 21 years ago

Services
Preceding station	Fukuoka City Subway	Following station
Yakuin N14 towards Hashimoto	Nanakuma Line	Tenjin-Minami N16 towards Hakata
Location

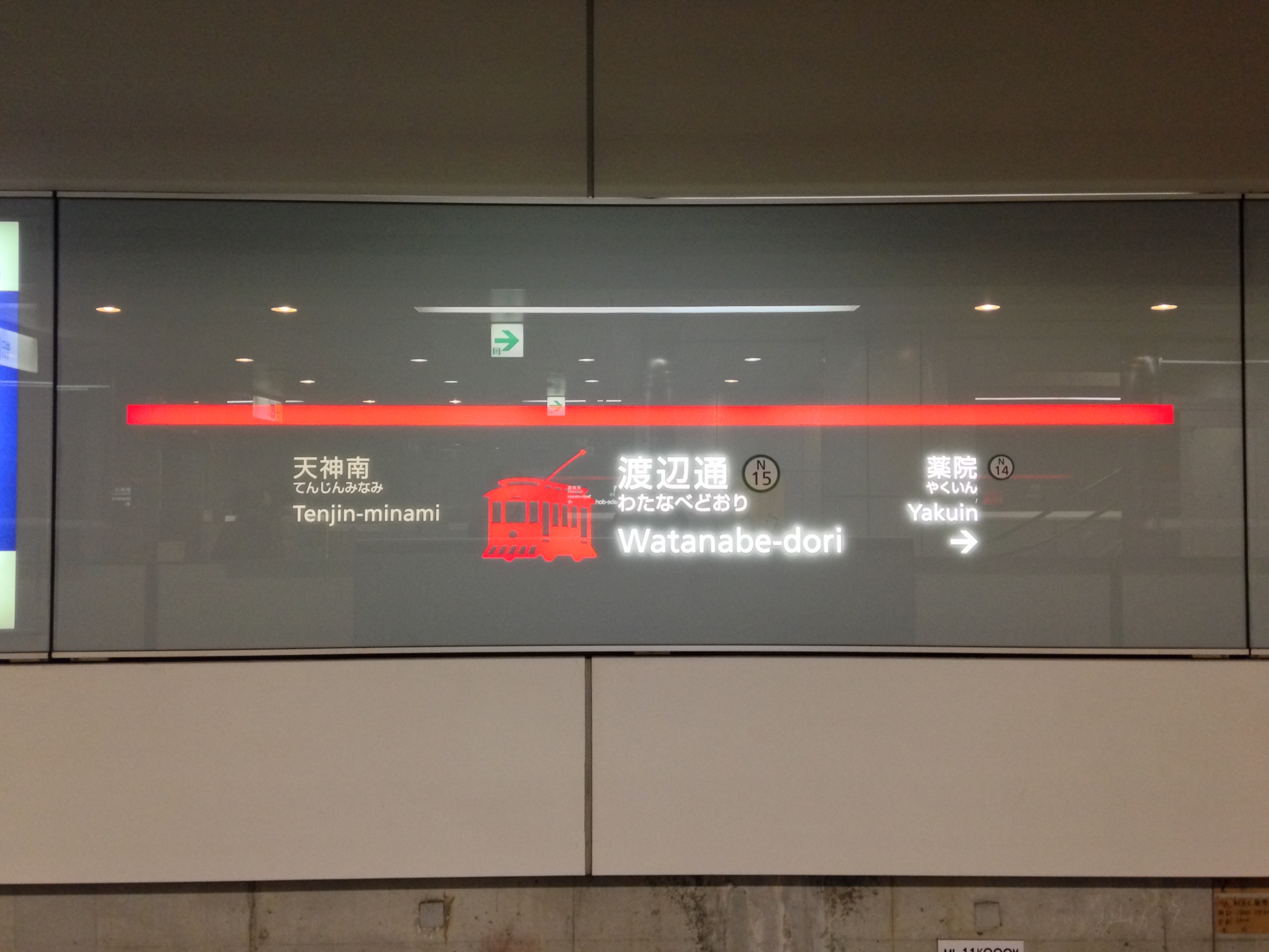
Running in board

Watanabe-dōri Station (渡辺通駅, Watanabe-dōri-eki) is a train station located in Chūō-ku, Fukuoka. Watanabe-dōri (ja:渡辺通り) means "Mr. Watanabe's avenue" in Japanese, to commemorate Yohatirō Watanabe (渡辺與八郎)'s efforts to establish the tram line here in 1911. The station's symbol mark is a tram, in red, that used to run on the line.

== Lines ==
- Fukuoka City Subway
  - Nanakuma Line

== Platforms ==
1	■ Nanakuma Line	for Hakata
2	■ Nanakuma Line	for Hashimoto
