= Kushida Shrine Station =

Metro station in Fukuoka, Japan

N17 Kushida Shrine Station 櫛田神社前駅
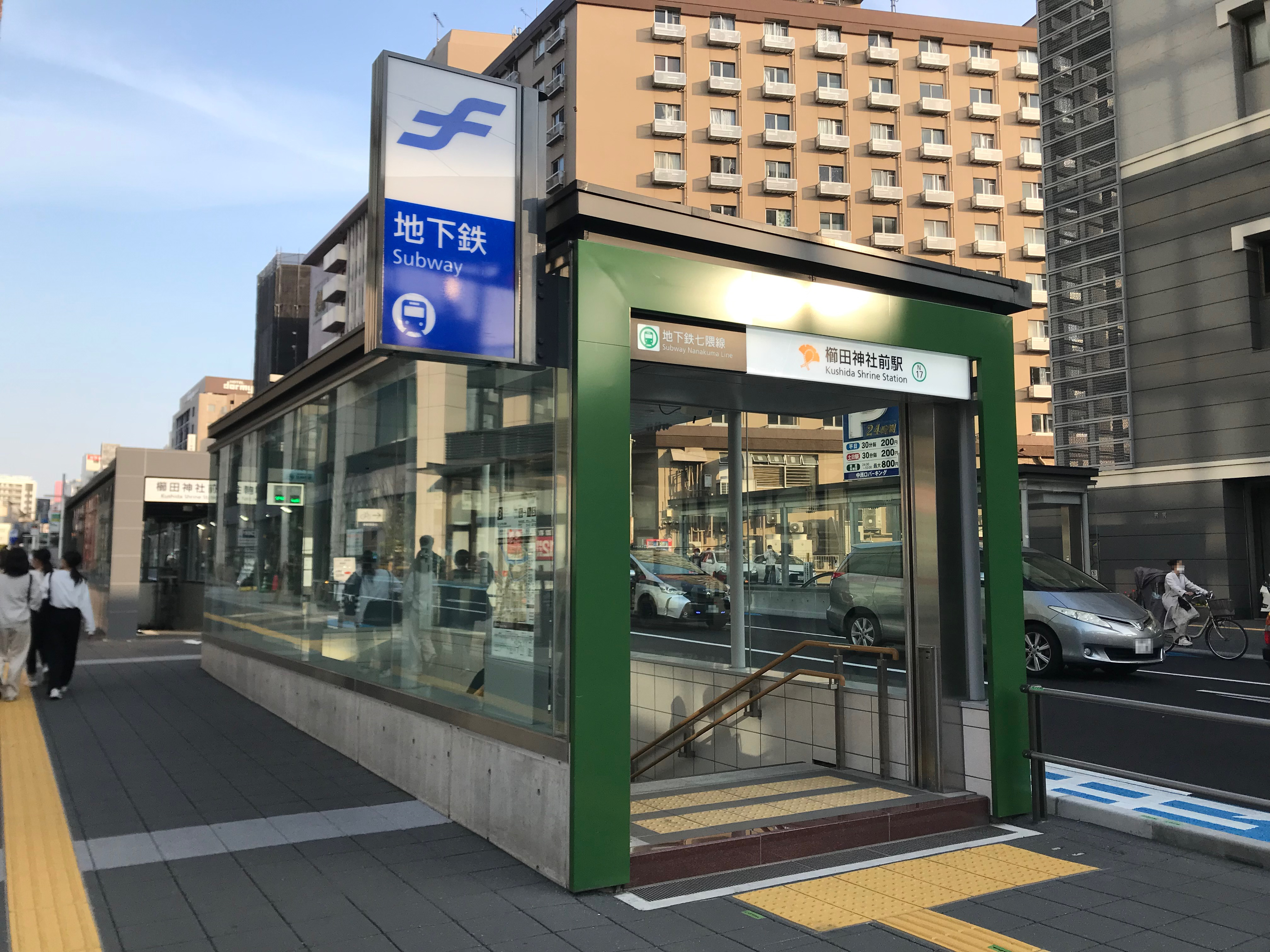
- Exit of Kushida Shrine Station

General information
- Location: Hakata Ward, Fukuoka, Fukuoka; Japan
- System: Fukuoka City Subway station
- Operator: Fukuoka City Subway
- Line: Nanakuma Line
- Platforms: 2 - island platforms
- Tracks: 2

Construction
- Structure type: Underground

Other information
- Station code: N17

History
- Opened: 27 March 2023

Services
Preceding station	Fukuoka City Subway	Following station
Tenjin-Minami N16 towards Hashimoto	Nanakuma Line	Hakata N18 Terminus
Location
- Location within Fukuoka Prefecture Location within Japan

Kushida Shrine Station (櫛田神社前駅, Kushida Jinja-mae-eki) is a subway station on the Fukuoka City Subway Nanakuma Line in Hakata-ku, Fukuoka in Japan. The station symbol is a yellow ginkgo leaf with a Kakinawa rope used in the Hakata Gion Yamakasa festival.

== Lines ==
- Fukuoka City Subway
  - Nanakuma Line

== Platforms ==
1	■ Nanakuma Line	for Hakata
2	■ Nanakuma Line	for Hashimoto

== History ==
The name of the station was finalized on 1 July 2021, and its symbol was revealed on 7 January 2022.

Kushida Shrine Station began operations on 27 March 2023, when the Nanakuma Line was extended east to Hakata Station. Originally scheduled for a 2020 opening, a sinkhole pushed back the opening date by three years.

== Surrounding area ==
- Canal City Hakata
- Kushida Shrine
