= Yakuin Station =

Railway and metro station in Fukuoka, Japan

T 02 N14 Yakuin Station 薬院駅
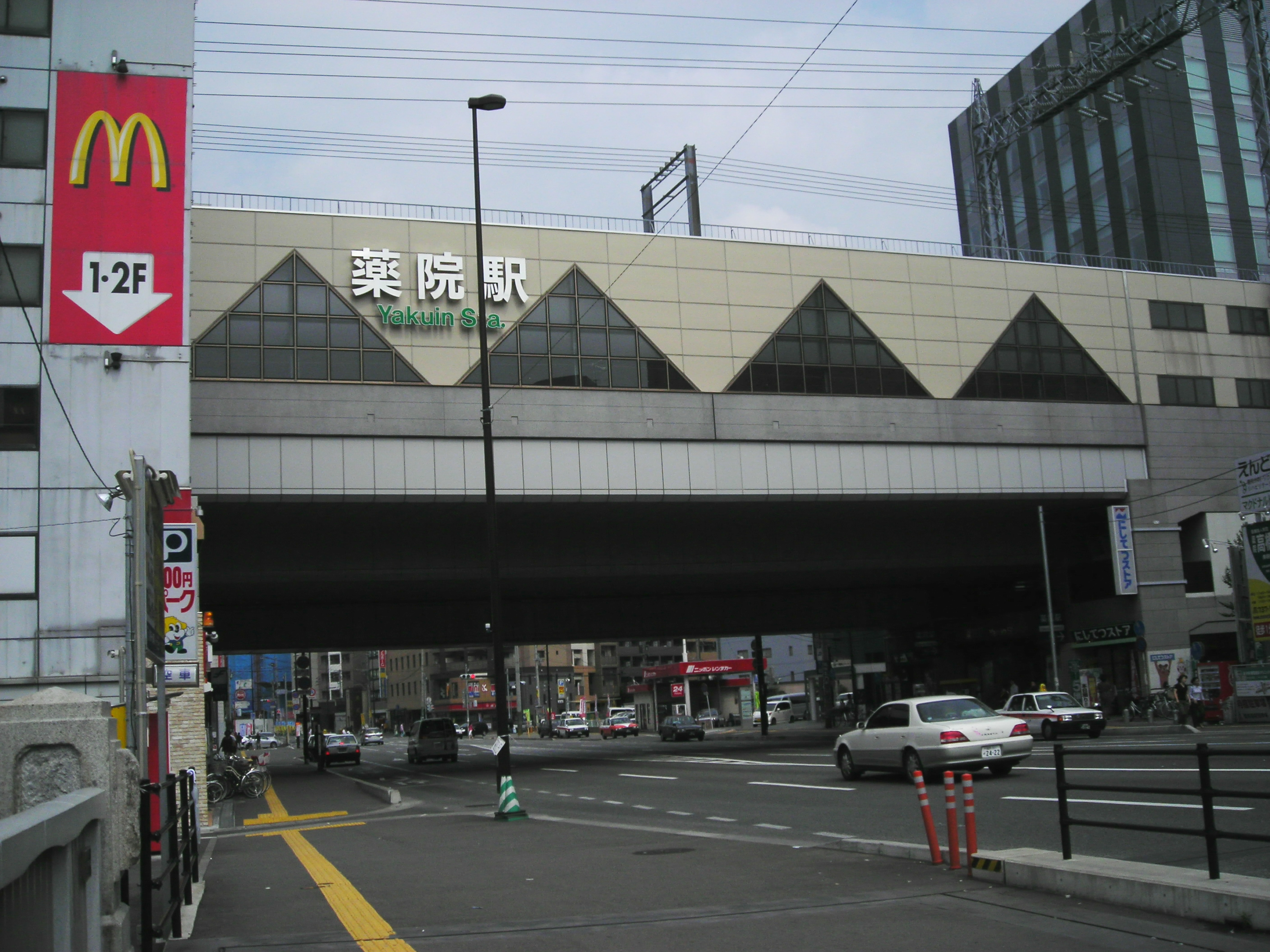
- Yakuin Station

General information
- Location: 21-16 1-chōme Shirogane, Chūō-ku, Fukuoka-shi, Fukuoka-ken
- Coordinates: 33°34′54.93″N 130°24′6.06″E
- Operator: Fukuoka City Subway; Nishitetsu
- Lines: Nanakuma Line; ■ Tenjin Ōmuta Line
- Platforms: 2 side + 2 island platforms

Other information
- Station code: T02, N14

History
- Opened: 1 June 1927

Passengers
- FY2022: 35,012 (NNR); 9,528 (Fukuoka Subway)

Services
Preceding station	Fukuoka City Subway	Following station
Yakuin-ōdōri towards Hashimoto	Nanakuma Line	Watanabe-dōri towards Hakata
Preceding station	Nishitetsu	Following station
Nishitetsu Fukuoka (Tenjin) Terminus	Tenjin Ōmuta Line Local	Nishitetsu Hirao towards Ōmuta
Nishitetsu Fukuoka (Tenjin) Terminus	Tenjin Ōmuta Line Express	Ōhashi towards Ōmuta
Location
- Location within Fukuoka Prefecture Location within Japan

Yakuin Station (薬院駅, Yakuin-eki) is a passenger railway station located in Chūō-ku, Fukuoka. The above ground portion is operated by the private transportation company Nishi-Nippon Railroad (NNR), and has station number T02, and the underground portion is operated by the Fukuoka City Subway The subway station's symbol mark is a mortar and pestle in light green, because 薬院 means medicinal plant botanical garden in Japanese.

== Lines ==
The station is served by the Nishitetsu Tenjin Ōmuta Line and is 0.8 kilometers from the starting point of the line at Nishitetsu Fukuoka (Tenjin) Station. It is also served by the subway Nanakuma Line and is 10.8 kilometers form the terminus of that line at Hashimoto.

== Station layout ==
The above ground station consists of two elevated opposed side platforms with the station building underneath. The subway station is one-floor underground, with an island platform on the second-floor underneath.

=== Nishitetsu ===
1	■ Tenjin Ōmuta Line	for Futsukaichi, Kurume, Yanagawa and Ōmuta
2	■ Tenjin Ōmuta Line	for Fukuoka

=== Fukuoka City Subway ===
1	■ Nanakuma Line	for Hakata
2	■ Nanakuma Line	for Hashimoto

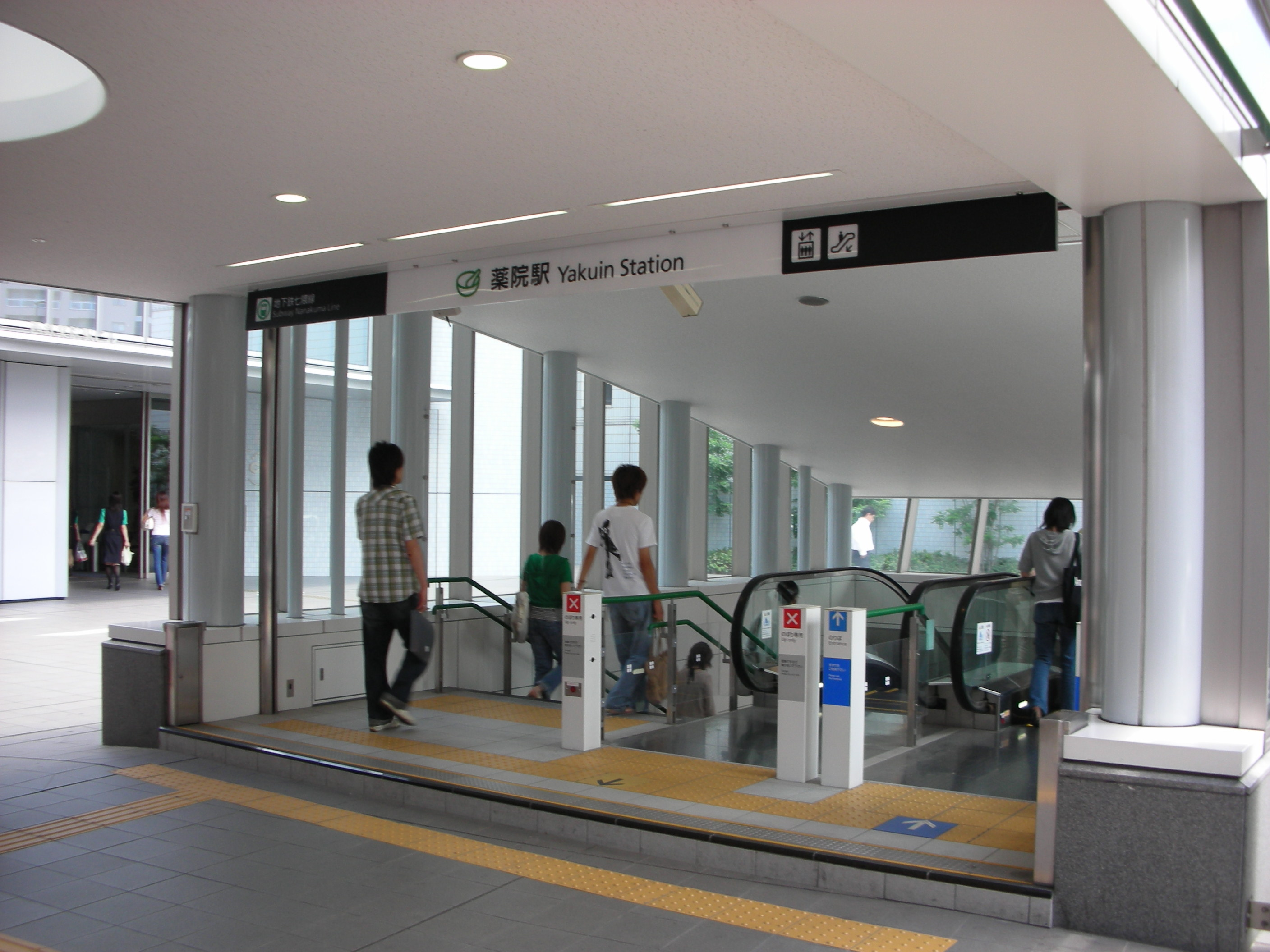
Yakuin Station in Fukuoka City Subway

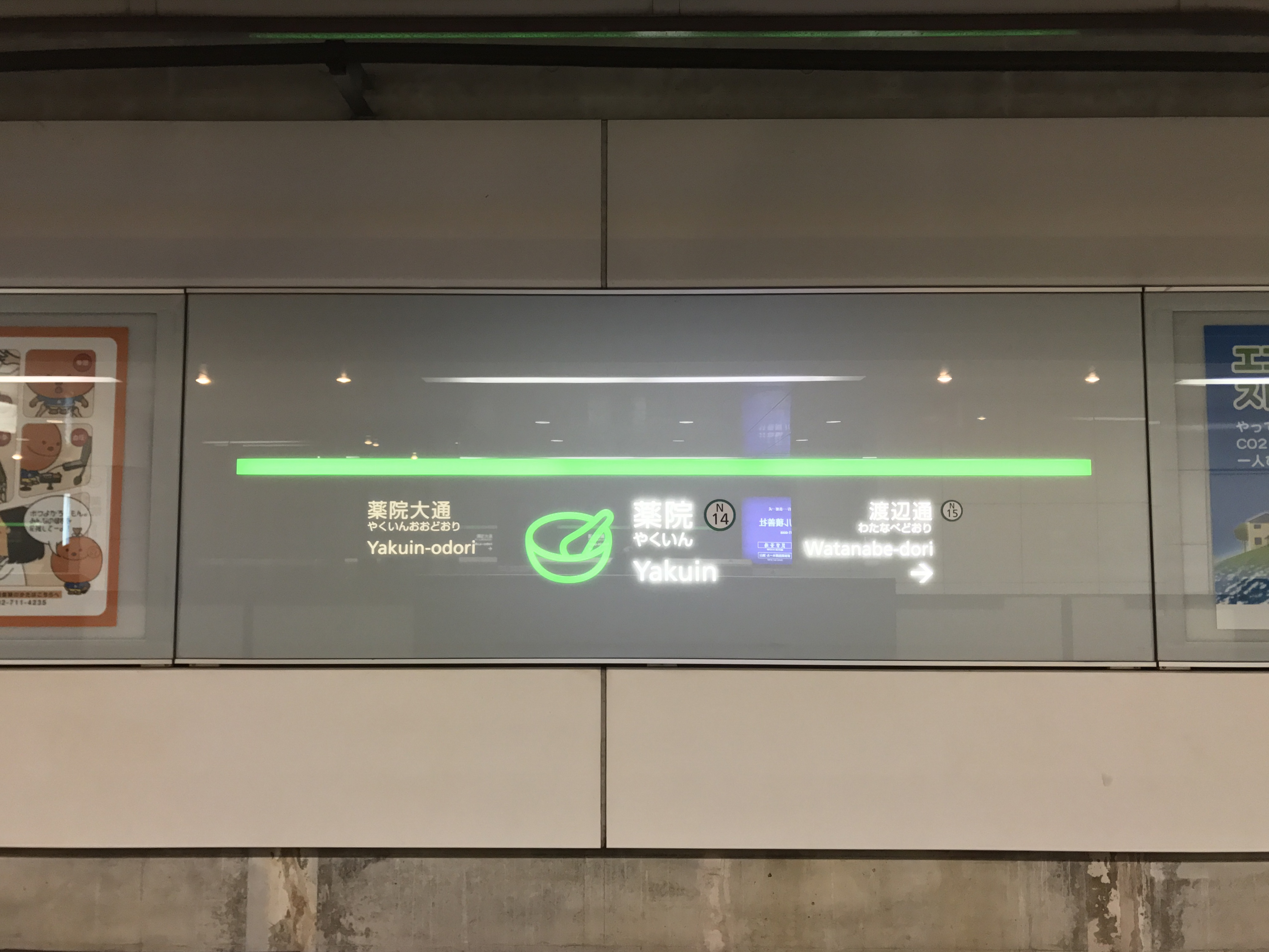
Subway's Running in board

== History ==
The station was opened on 1 June 1927 as a station on the Kyushu Railway. The subway station opened on 3 February 2005.

== Passenger statistics ==
In fiscal 2022, the NNR station was used by 35,012 passengers daily. During the same period, the Fukuoka Subway portion of the station was used by 9,528 passengers daily.

== See also ==
- List of railway stations in Japan
