= Umebayashi Station =

Metro station in Fukuoka, Japan

Coordinates: 33°32′45″N 130°21′18″E

N05 Umebayashi Station 梅林駅
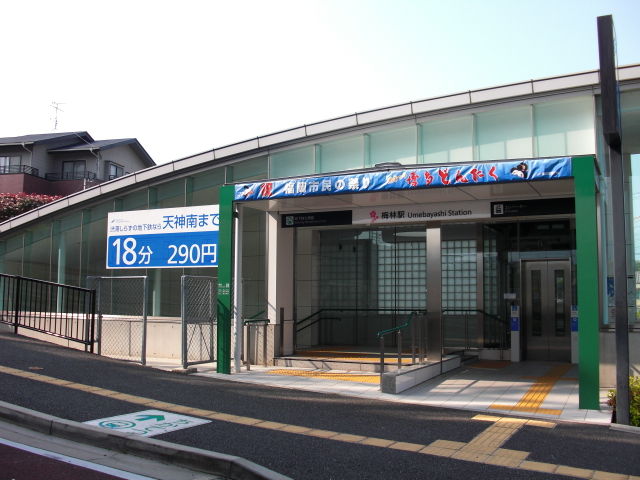

General information
- Location: Jōnan, Fukuoka, Fukuoka; Japan
- System: Fukuoka City Subway station
- Operator: Fukuoka City Subway
- Line: Nanakuma Line

Other information
- Station code: N05

History
- Opened: February 3, 2005; 21 years ago

Passengers
- 2006: 810 daily

Services
| Preceding station | Fukuoka City Subway | Following station |
|---|---|---|
| Noke N04 towards Hashimoto | Nanakuma Line | Fukudaimae N06 towards Hakata |
Location

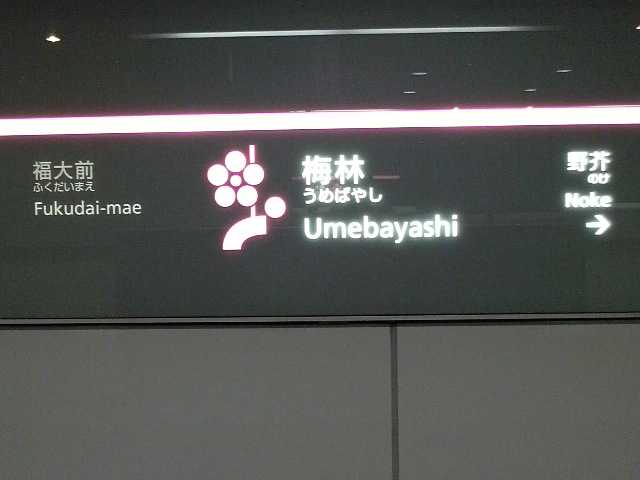
Station symbol

Umebayashi Station (梅林駅) is a subway station on the Fukuoka City Subway Nanakuma Line in Jōnan-ku, Fukuoka in Japan. Its station symbol is a picture of a plum blossom in pink.

It is the southernmost subway station in the entire country.

== Lines ==
- Fukuoka City Subway
  - Nanakuma Line

== Platforms ==
| 1 | ■ Nanakuma Line | for Hakata |
| 2 | ■ Nanakuma Line | for Hashimoto |

== Vicinity ==
- Umebayashinaka Park
- Fukuoka University Hospital
- Yamato Transport Company
- Office of The Times
- Umebayashi Kofun

== History ==
- February 3, 2005: Opening of the station
- December 22, 2005: Elevator closed because of an accident
- February 2007: Motorcycle and Bicycle parking area opened
