= Nanakuma Line =

Metro line in Fukuoka prefecture, Japan

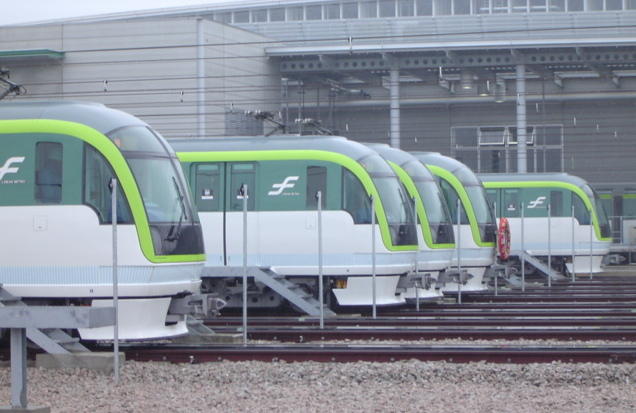
- 3000 series trainsets at Hashimoto depot

Overview
- Locale: Fukuoka, Fukuoka
- Termini: Hashimoto; Hakata
- Stations: 18
- Color on map: Green

Service
- Type: Rapid transit
- System: Fukuoka City Subway
- Depot: Hashimoto
- Rolling stock: 3000 series

History
- Opened: 3 February 2005; 21 years ago
- Last extension: 2023

Technical
- Line length: 13.6 km (8.5 mi)
- Num of tracks: 2
- Track gauge: 1,435 mm (4 ft 8 1/2 in) standard gauge
- Electrification: 1,500 V DC from overhead catenary

The Nanakuma Line (七隈線, Nanakuma-sen) is a subway line, part of the Fukuoka City Subway system in Fukuoka, Japan. It runs from Hashimoto Station in Nishi Ward to Hakata Station in Hakata Ward, all within Fukuoka. The line's color on maps is green. Officially, the line is called Line 3 (Nanakuma Line) (3号線(七隈線), San-gō-sen (Nanakuma-sen)). Like other lines on the subway system, stations are equipped with automatic platform gates, and trains are automatically operated by an ATO system.

== Overview ==
The line is 13.6 km (8.5 mi) long and serves eighteen stations across five wards in Fukuoka. All stations are equipped with platform screen doors.

Unlike the Airport Line and the Hakozaki Line which both run at 1,067 mm (3 ft 6 in), the Nanakuma Line runs on 1,435 mm (4 ft 8 1/2 in) standard gauge.

Station numbering for all stations on the Fukuoka City Subway was introduced in March 2011.

During peak hours, the frequency is one train every 3 minutes 45 seconds. Starting on 11 March 2023, the interval was increased to every 3 minutes 30 seconds.

== Stations ==
All stations are in Fukuoka, Fukuoka Prefecture.

The line is entirely underground.

No.	Station name	Japanese	Distance (km)		Transfers	Location
No.	Station name	Japanese	Between stations	Total	Transfers	Location
N01	Hashimoto	橋本	-	0		Nishi
N02	Jirōmaru	次郎丸	1.0	1.0		Sawara
N03	Kamo	賀茂	0.7	1.7		Sawara
N04	Noke	野芥	0.9	2.6		Sawara
N05	Umebayashi	梅林	0.8	3.4		Jōnan
N06	Fukudaimae	福大前	0.9	4.3		Jōnan
N07	Nanakuma	七隈	0.6	4.9		Jōnan
N08	Kanayama	金山	0.8	5.7		Jōnan
N09	Chayama	茶山	0.8	6.5		Jōnan
N10	Befu	別府	1.0	7.5		Jōnan
N11	Ropponmatsu	六本松	0.8	8.3		Chūō
N12	Sakurazaka	桜坂	0.9	9.2		Chūō
N13	Yakuin-ōdōri	薬院大通	1.0	10.2		Chūō
N14	Yakuin	薬院	0.6	10.8	Nishitetsu Tenjin Ōmuta Line (T-02)	Chūō
N15	Watanabe-dōri	渡辺通	0.5	11.3		Chūō
N16	Tenjin-Minami	天神南	0.7	12.0	Airport Line (Tenjin); Nishitetsu Tenjin Ōmuta Line (Fukuoka)	Chūō
N17	Kushida Shrine	櫛田神社前	1.0	13.0		Chūō
N18	Hakata	博多	0.6	13.6	Airport Line (K11); San'yō Shinkansen; Hakataminami Line; Kyūshū Shinkansen; Relay Kamome (Nishi Kyushu Shinkansen connection); JA JB Kagoshima Main Line (JA00/JB00); JC Fukuhoku Yutaka Line (JC00)	Hakata

== History ==
This is the fourth linear motor subway line to be built in Japan, opening on 3 February 2005. The Nanakuma Line was originally conceived in the 1960s to provide access to Nakamura Gakuen University and Fukuoka University, and in 1975 it was planned to run from Tenjin-Minami Station to Jōnan Station as a linear-motored subway, but the plan was subsequently amended for the line to end at Hashimoto Station.

The name for the line was selected in a naming contest. "Nanakuma Line", which finished third, was selected over the first-place "Jonan Line" and runner-up "Fukudai Line" because of its stronger historical connotations as well as being more geographically accurate compared to the other names. Nanakuma is a district in Jōnan ward which is close to the center of the line.

The line links the Central business district and the southwestern part of the city which previously did not have a railway line.

Construction on a 1.6 km (0.99 mi) extension from Tenjin-Minami to Hakata station via Canal City received its final planning permissions in 2014. The plan also included a new station in the area of the Kushida Shrine. Construction was initially scheduled to be completed by 2020, but delays after a sinkhole opening up in front of JR Hakata Station pushed the schedule up by three years. On 7 January 2021, Fukuoka City announced the planned opening of the extension by March 2023. The city also reported that there were no delays as a result of the COVID-19 Pandemic. The extension to Hakata Station via Kushida Shrine Station began operation on 27 March 2023.

=== Future Plans ===
==== Fukuoka Airport extension ====
On 21 November 2022, Fukuoka mayor Sōichirō Takashima announced plans to extend the Nanakuma line to Fukuoka Airport. The extension is expected to head east from the terminus at Hakata Station and run for around 3.0 km (1.9 mi) to the international terminal at the airport. Currently, the domestic terminal at Fukuoka Airport is served by the Airport Line on the subway network. However, the international terminal lacks a rail connection. A free shuttle bus currently connects the two terminals.

Expansion of line capacity

To alleviate crowding due to increased passenger volume, plans were announced in 2026 to convert the presently 4-car Nanakuma Line to a 6-car line, with the city aiming to launch the phased operations of these 6-car train services from FY2030 onwards. Including the work needed to expand and modify platforms as well as upgrade train yards, the plans would cost an estimated 36 billion yen.

== Rolling stock ==
The line currently employs four-car long 3000 series trains purchased in 2005 for the start of revenue service. There are 17 sets accounting for 68 cars.

A further four sets were ordered in 2021. These sets, designated as 3000A series, feature a blue and green livery and were intended for an increase in service when the Nanakuma Line was extended from Tenjin-Minami to Hakata in March 2023.

== See also ==
- List of railway lines in Japan
