= Tenjin-Minami Station =

Metro station in Fukuoka, Japan

Coordinates: 33.5881952°N 130.4017282°E

N16 Tenjin-Minami Station 天神南駅
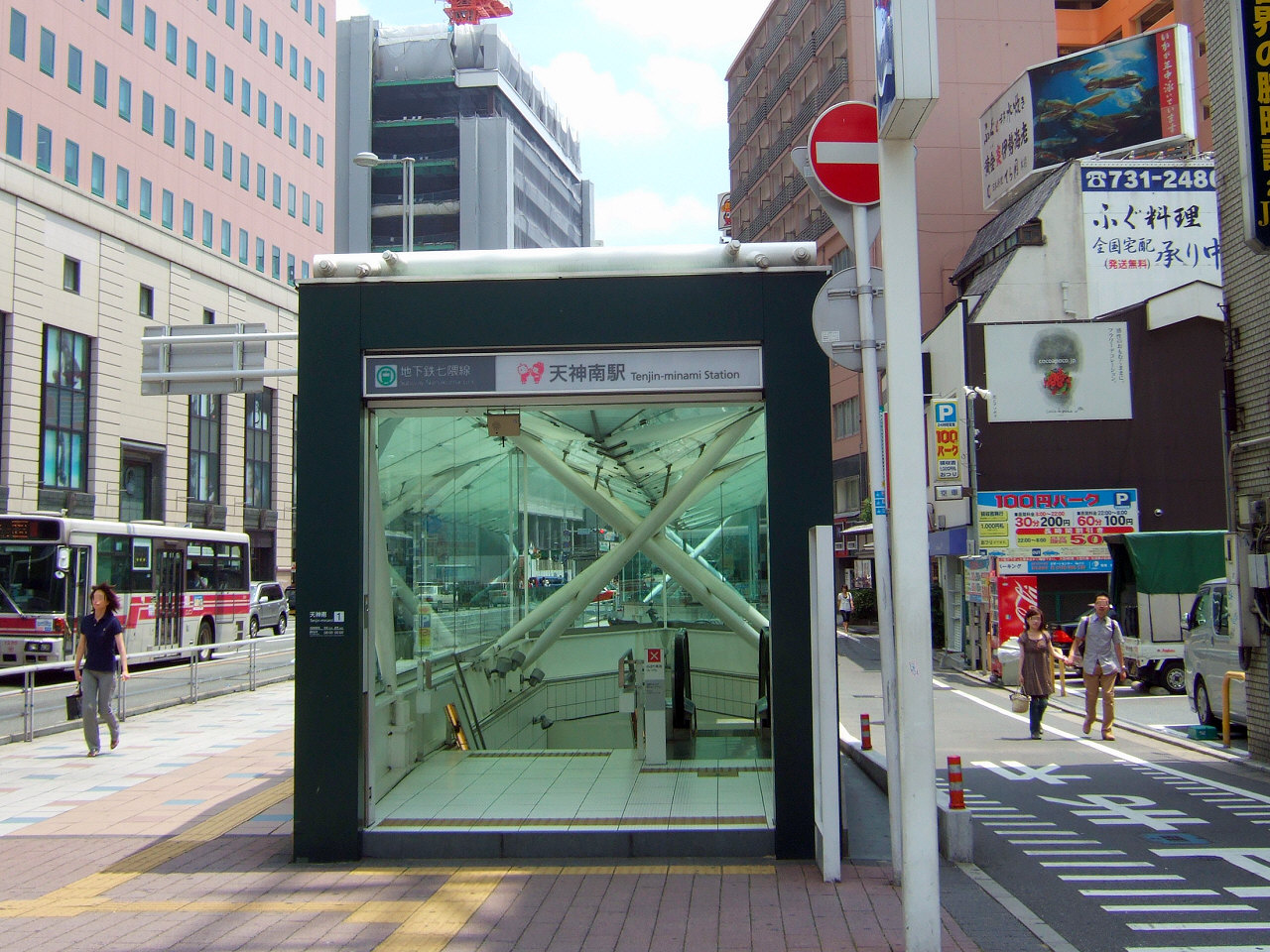
- Exit 1 of Tenjin-Minami Station

General information
- Location: 1-chōme Tenjin, Chūō, Fukuoka, Fukuoka （福岡市中央区天神1丁目） Japan
- System: Fukuoka City Subway station
- Operator: Fukuoka City Subway
- Line: Nanakuma Line

Other information
- Station code: N16

History
- Opened: 3 February 2005; 21 years ago

Services
Preceding station	Fukuoka City Subway	Following station
Watanabe-dōri N15 towards Hashimoto	Nanakuma Line	Kushida Shrine N17 towards Hakata
Location

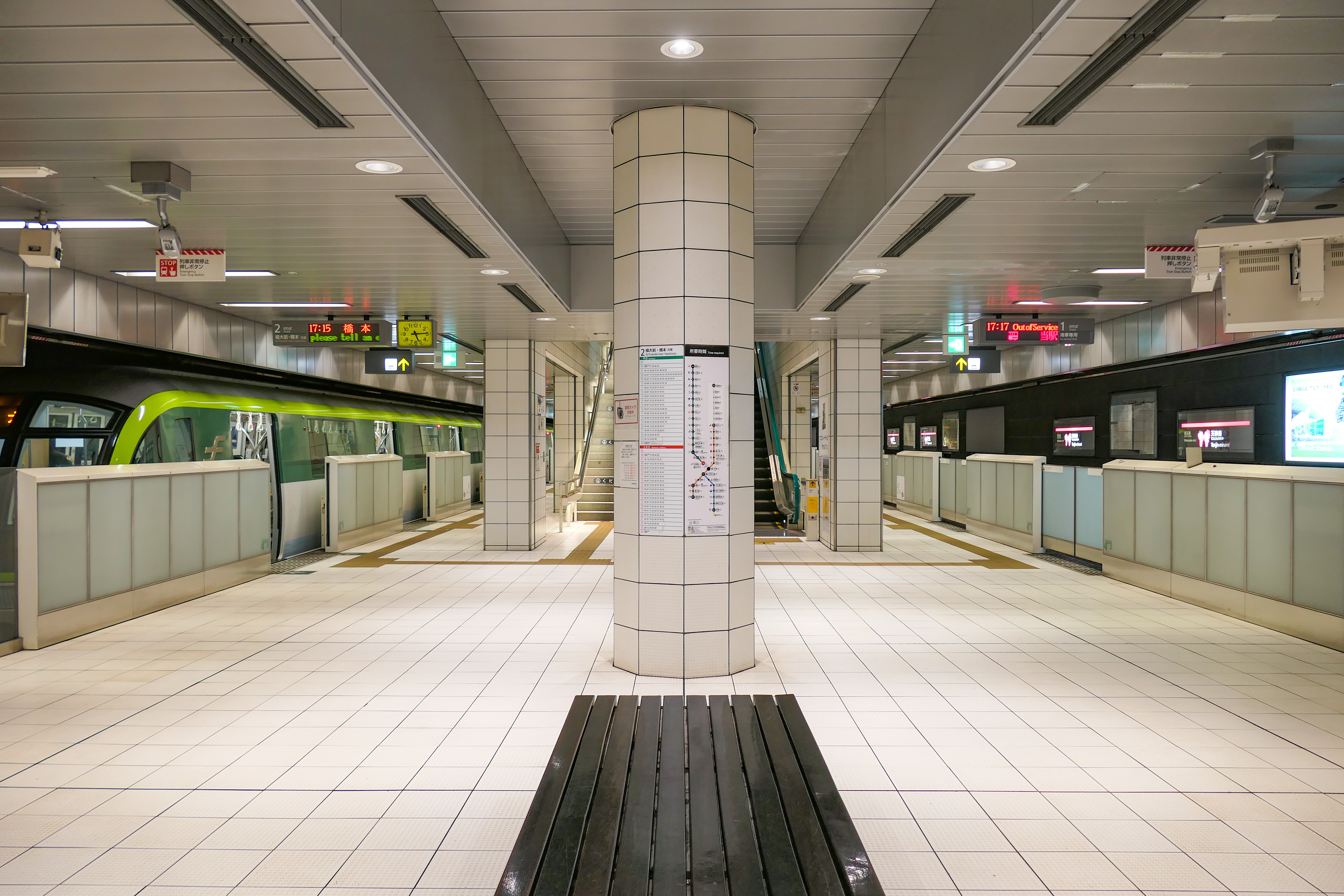
Platform

Tenjin-Minami Station (天神南駅, Tenjin-Minami-eki) is a subway station located in Chūō-ku, Fukuoka. It is connected to Tenjin Station and Nishitetsu Fukuoka (Tenjin) Station through the Tenjin Chikagai (天神地下街), an underground shopping street. The station symbol is of children, in pink, playing the "Tōryanse" game (similar to the London Bridge game).

== Lines ==
- Fukuoka City Subway
  - Nanakuma Line
- Transit to/from
  - Airport Line (Tenjin)
  - Nishi-Nippon Railroad: Tenjin Ōmuta Line (Fukuoka)

== Platforms ==
1	■ Nanakuma Line	for Hakata
2	■ Nanakuma Line	for Hashimoto

== History ==
The station opened on 3 February 2005 as the western terminus of the Nanakuma Line.

From 27 March 2023, all services continued west with the opening of a 1.6 km (0.99 mi) extension to Hakata Station.
