= Nishi-ku, Fukuoka =

Coordinates: 33°34′58″N 130°19′23″E

Nishi 西区
- Ward
- Nishi Ward
- Flag Seal

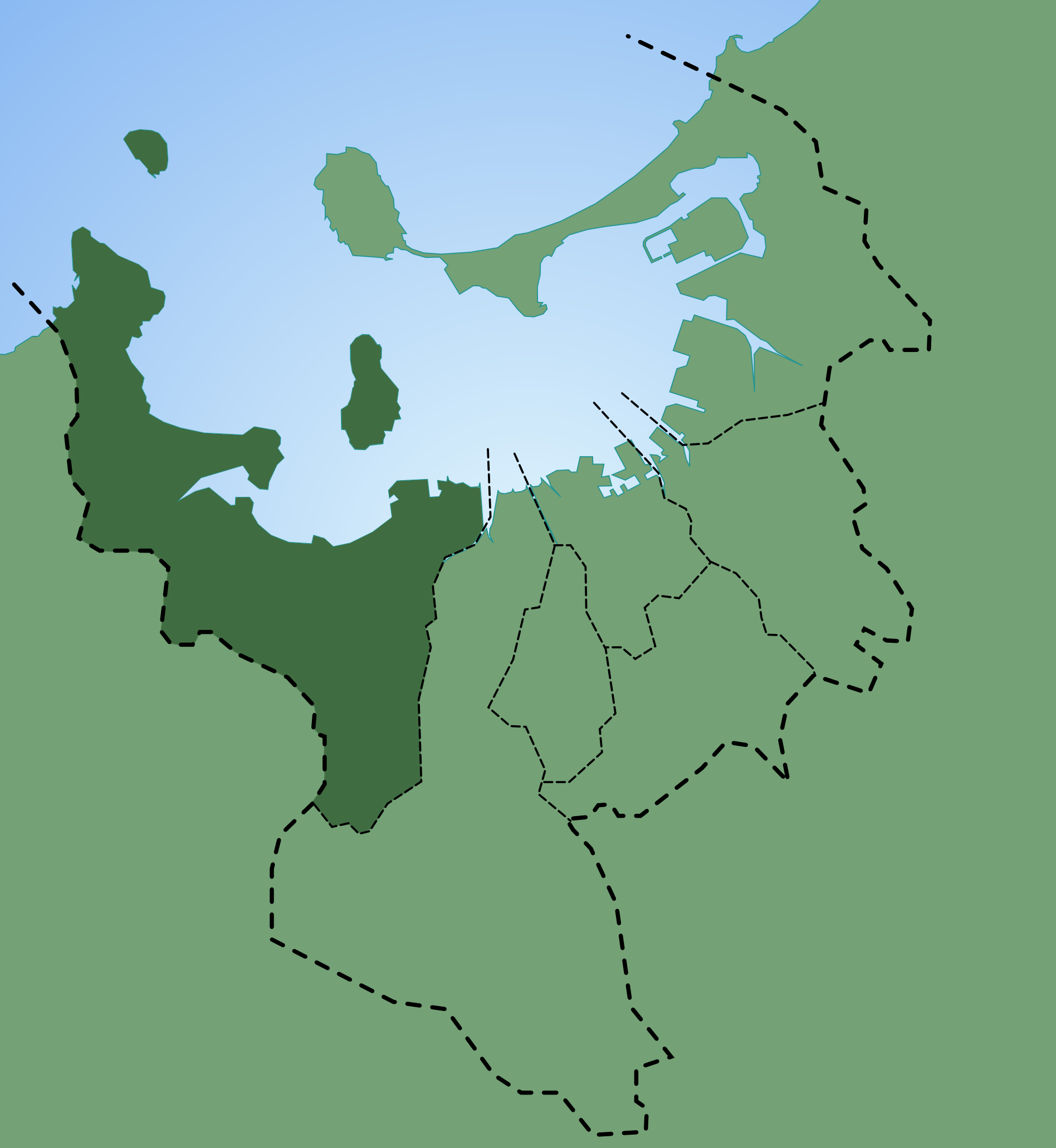
- Location of Nishi Ward in Fukuoka

- Country: Japan
- Region: Kyushu
- Prefecture: Fukuoka
- City: Fukuoka
- Time zone: UTC+9 (Japan Standard Time)

Nishi-ku (西区) is one of the seven wards of Fukuoka City, Japan. Meaning literally "west ward," it is bordered to the east by Sawara-ku, and to the west by Itoshima. As of 2003, it has a population of 173,813 people and an area of 83.81 km^{2}. As of 2016, its population had increased to 206,000 people. It has recently gained additional infrastructure in the form of the Nanakuma Line, in addition to the Fukuoka City Subway and the Chikuhi Line.

At the time of Fukuoka City's official designation as a City in 1972, Nishi-ku covered a larger area than it does today. On May 1, 1982, Nishi-ku was subdivided into the three smaller wards of Nishi-ku, Sawara-ku and Jōnan-ku.

== Facilities ==
=== Commerce ===
- Sky Dream Fukuoka

== Notable people ==
- Yukari Oshima, Japanese actress and martial artist, popular in Asia (mainly Japan, Hong Kong and the Philippines).

== Gallery ==
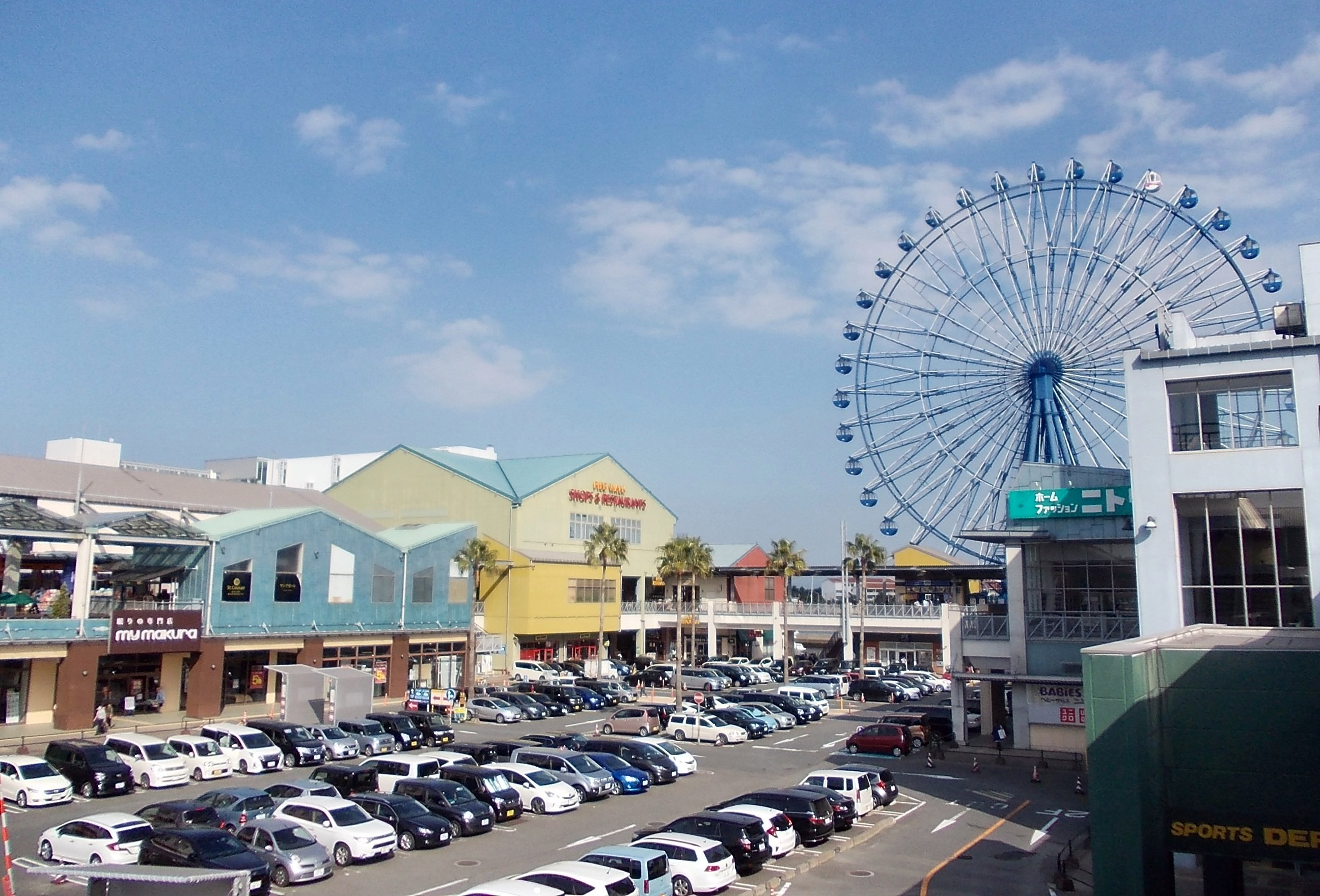
Marinoa City Fukuoka outlet mall and Sky wheel Ferris wheel in the background.

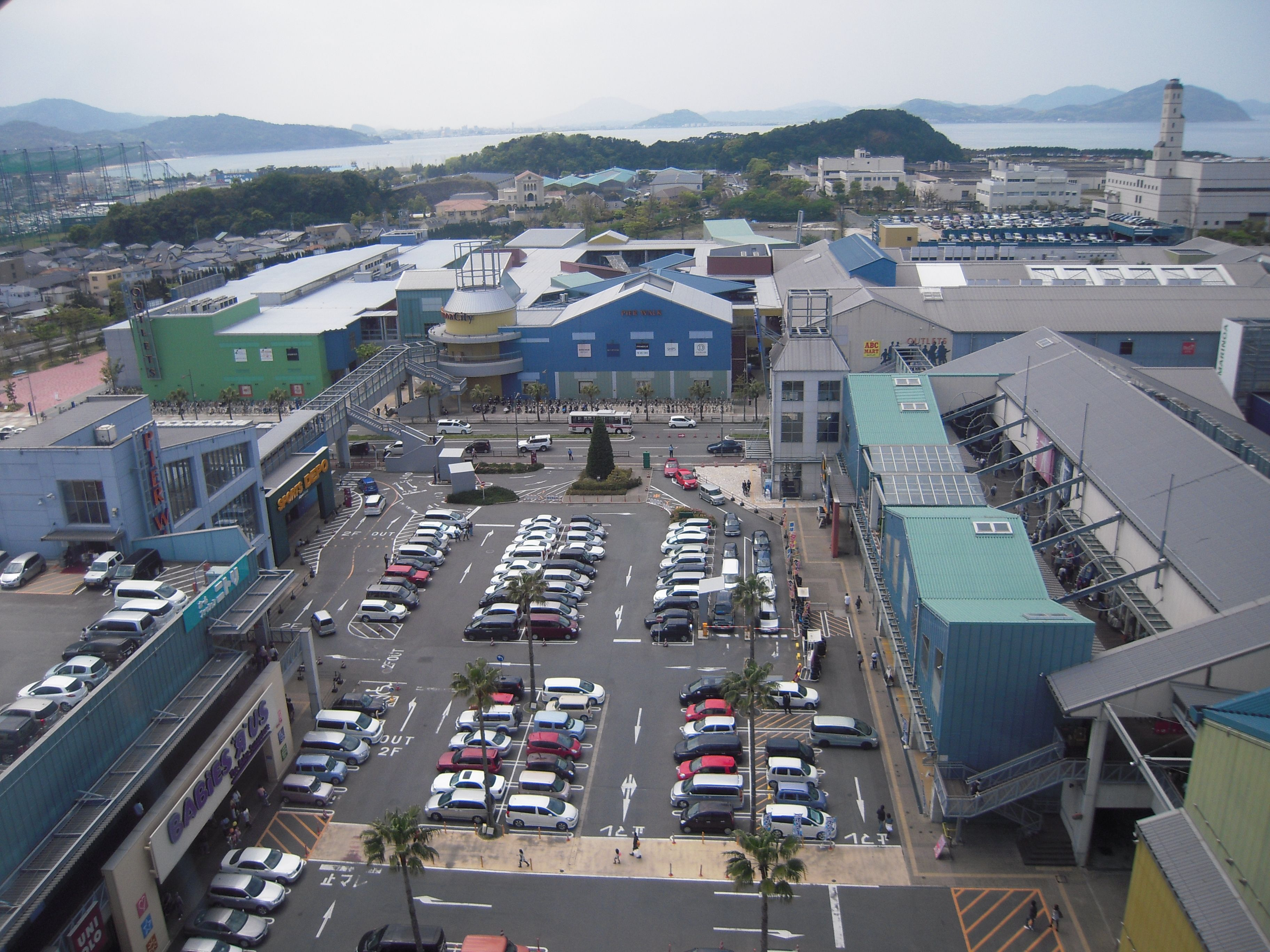
Marinoa City Fukuoka outlet mall seen from top of the Sky Ferris wheel.

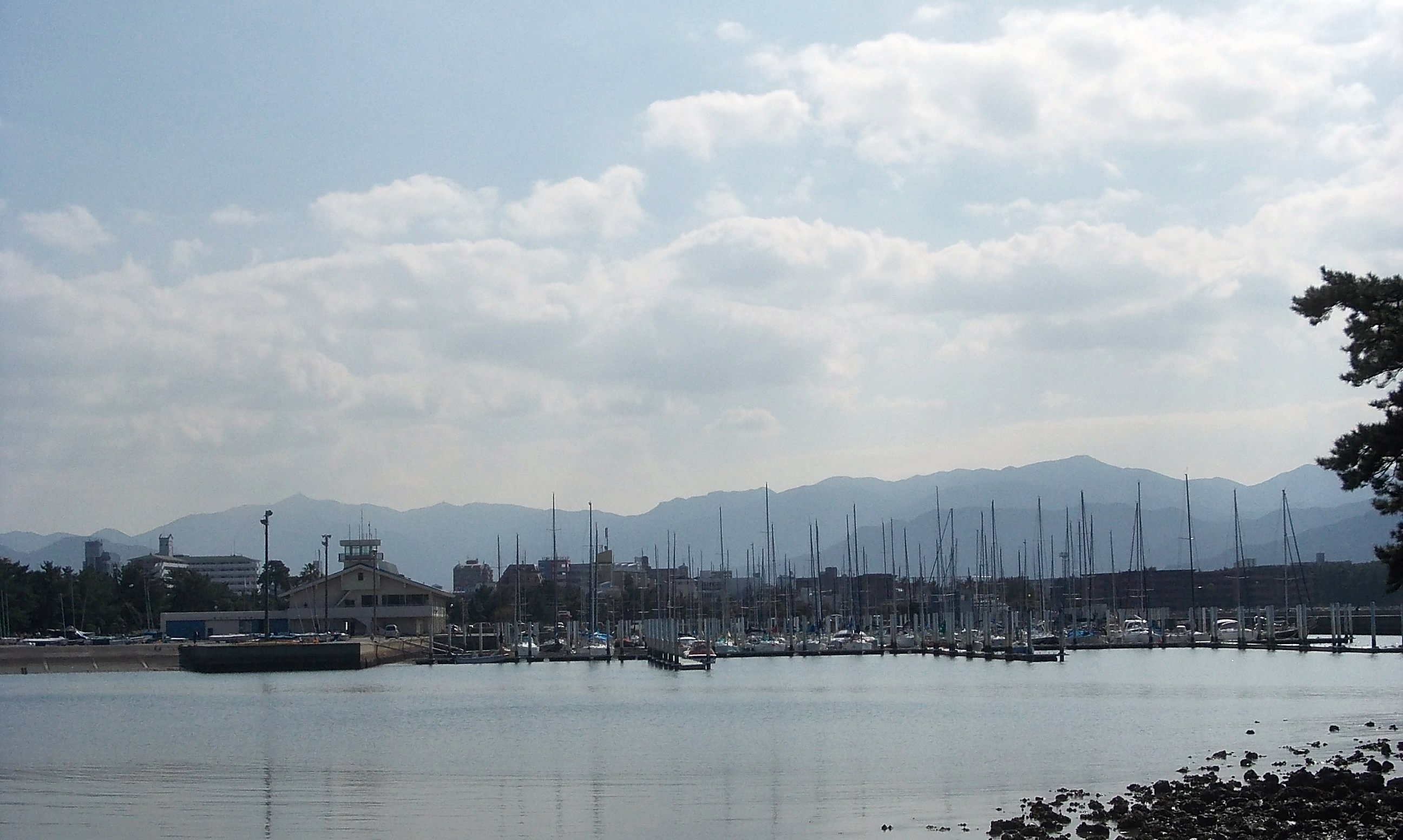
Fukuoka City Odo Yacht Harbor

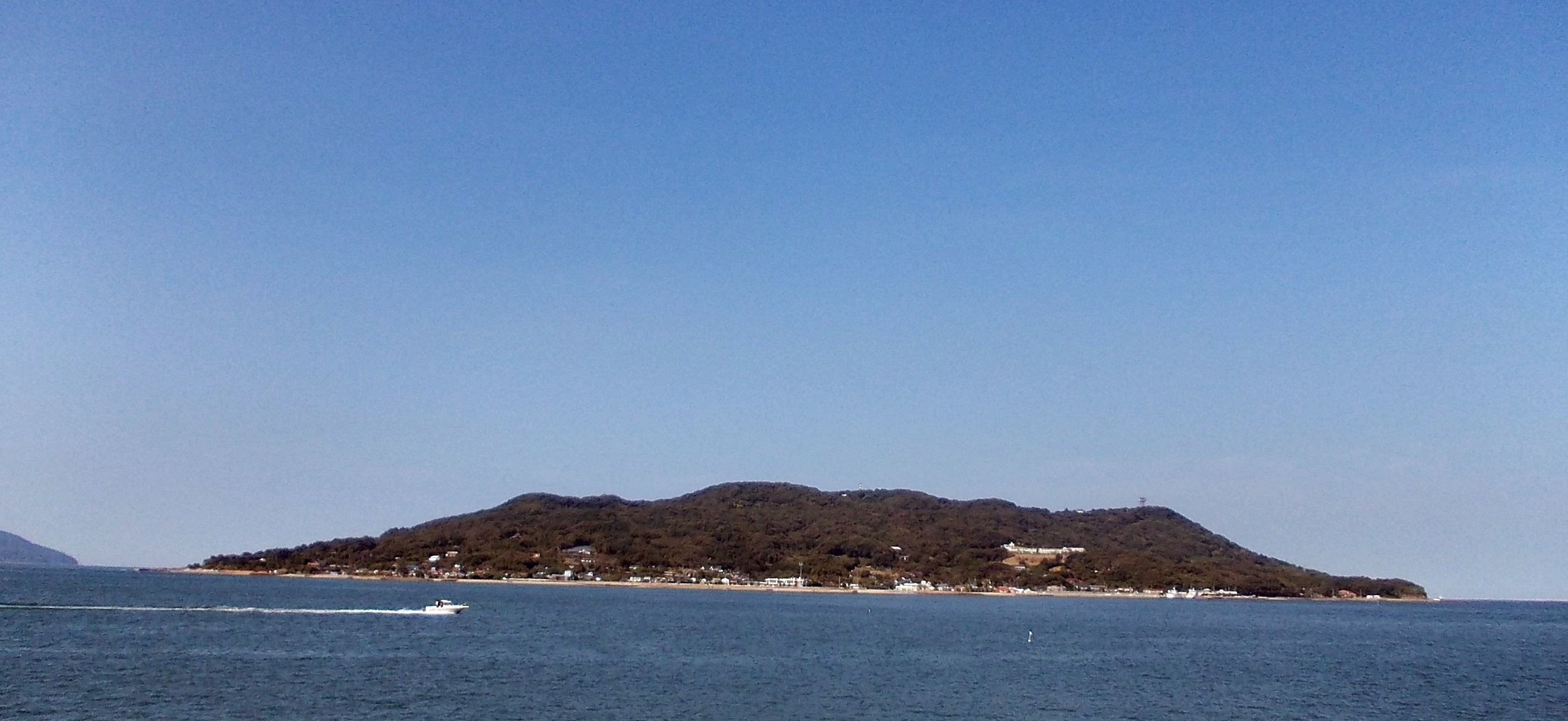
Nokonoshima Island

== See also ==
- Genkai Island
