= Hashimoto Station (Fukuoka) =

Metro station in Fukuoka, Japan

Coordinates: 33°33′19″N 130°19′16″E

N01 Hashimoto Station 橋本駅
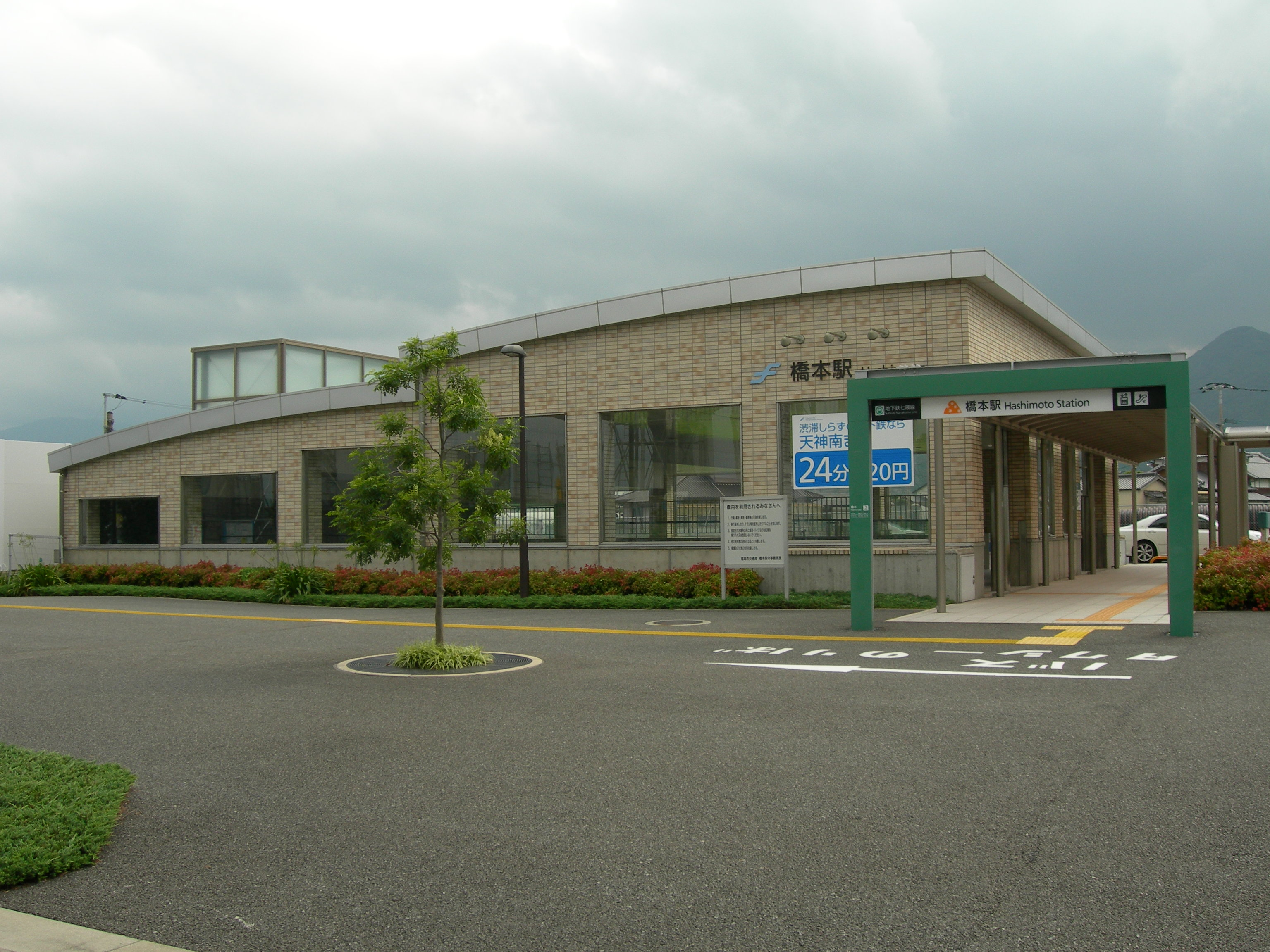

General information
- Location: Nishi, Fukuoka, Fukuoka; Japan
- System: Fukuoka City Subway station
- Operator: Fukuoka City Subway
- Line: Nanakuma Line

Other information
- Station code: N01

History
- Opened: February 3, 2005; 21 years ago

Passengers
- 2006: 1,900 daily

Services
Preceding station	Fukuoka City Subway	Following station
Terminus	Nanakuma Line	Jirōmaru N02 towards Hakata
Location

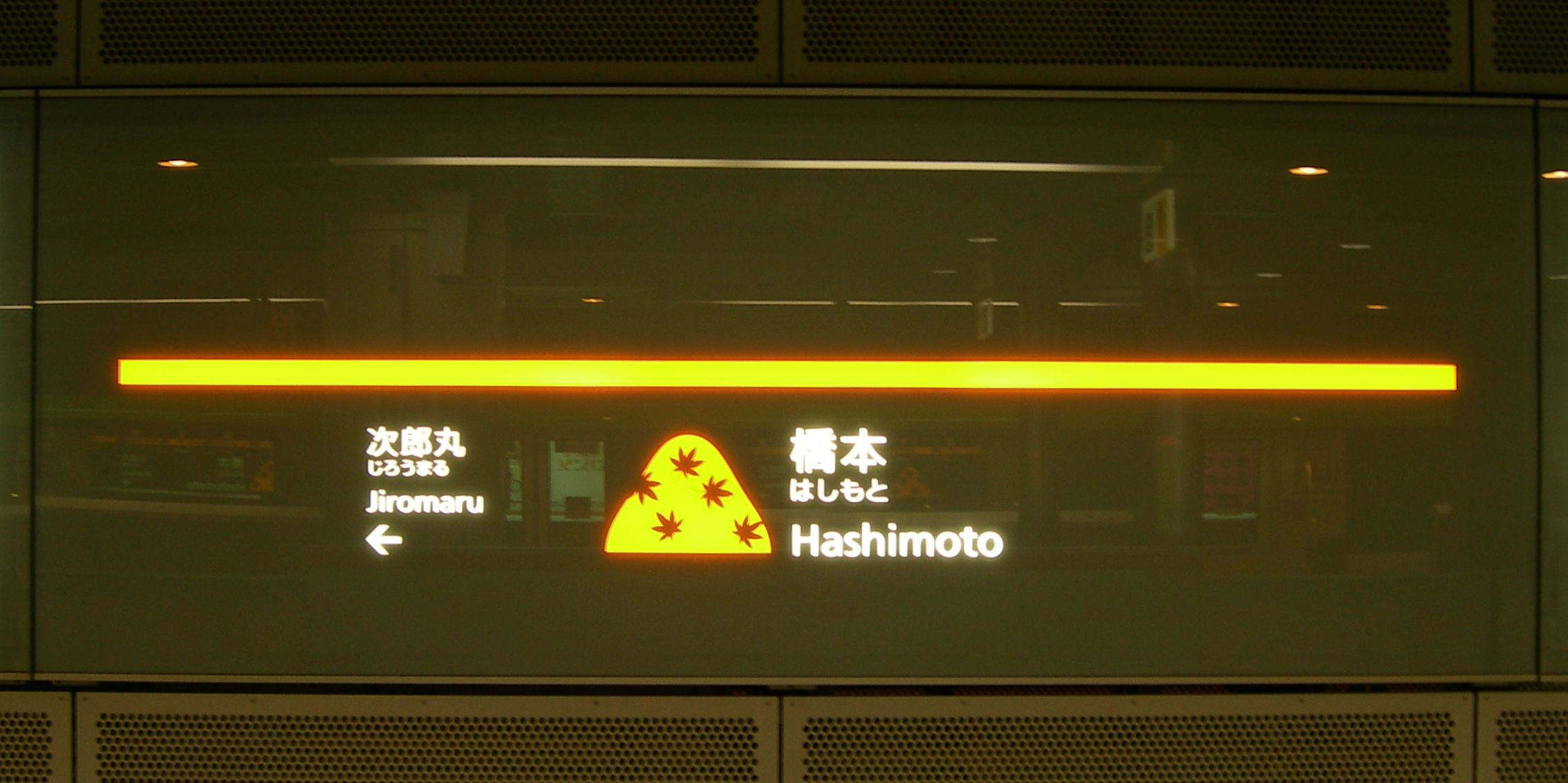
Station symbol

Hashimoto Station (橋本駅) is a subway station on the Fukuoka City Subway Nanakuma Line in Nishi-ku, Fukuoka. The station's symbol is a picture of maple leaves in front of an orange mountain, because there used to be Momiji-Hachimangu (ja:紅葉八幡宮).

Upon the opening of the Nanakuma Line in 2005, Hashimoto became the westernmost underground railway station in Japan.

== Lines ==
- Fukuoka City Subway
  - Nanakuma Line

== Platforms ==
1	■ Nanakuma Line	for Fukudaimae, Ropponmatsu, Yakuin and Hakata
2	■ Nanakuma Line	for Fukudaimae, Ropponmatsu, Yakuin and Hakata
3	■ Nanakuma Line	Terminus platform

== Vicinity ==
- Route 202
- Deodeo
- Nanakuma Line train depot
- Suga Shrine
- Hashimoto Park
- Nishitetsu bus station

== History ==
- February 3, 2005: Opening of the station
