= Fukuoka City Subway =

Rapid transit system in Fukuoka, Japan

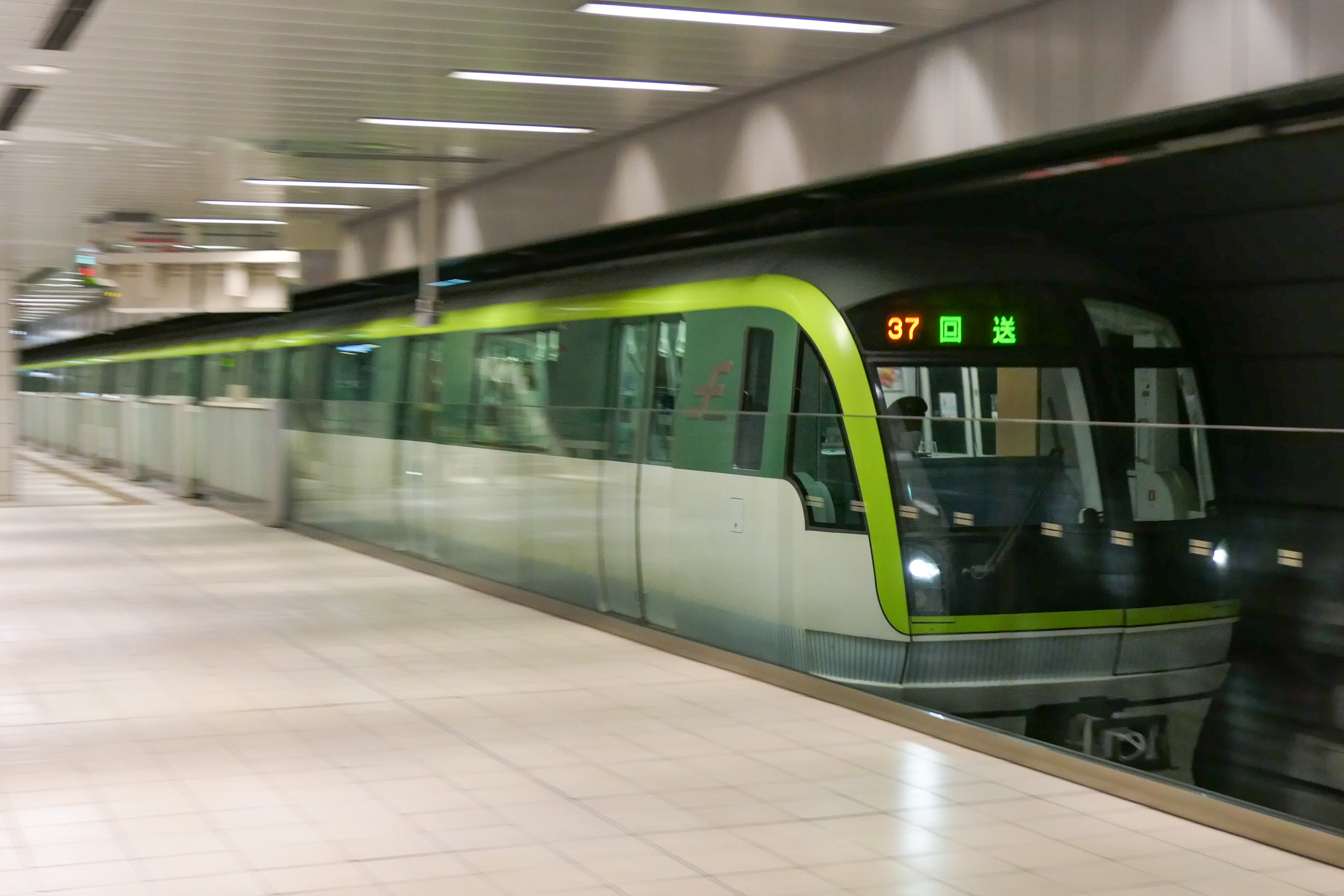
- A 3000A series train at Tenjin-Minami Station

Overview
- Native name: 福岡市地下鉄; Fukuoka-shi Chikatetsu
- Locale: Fukuoka, Japan
- Transit type: Rapid transit
- Number of lines: 3
- Number of stations: 36
- Website: Fukuoka City Subway

Operation
- Began operation: July 26, 1981; 45 years ago
- Operator: Fukuoka City Transportation Bureau

Technical
- System length: 31.4 km (19.5 mi)
- Track gauge: 1,067 mm (3 ft 6 in) (Note: Lines 1-2); 1,435 mm (4 ft 8 1/2 in) (Note: Line 3)
System map
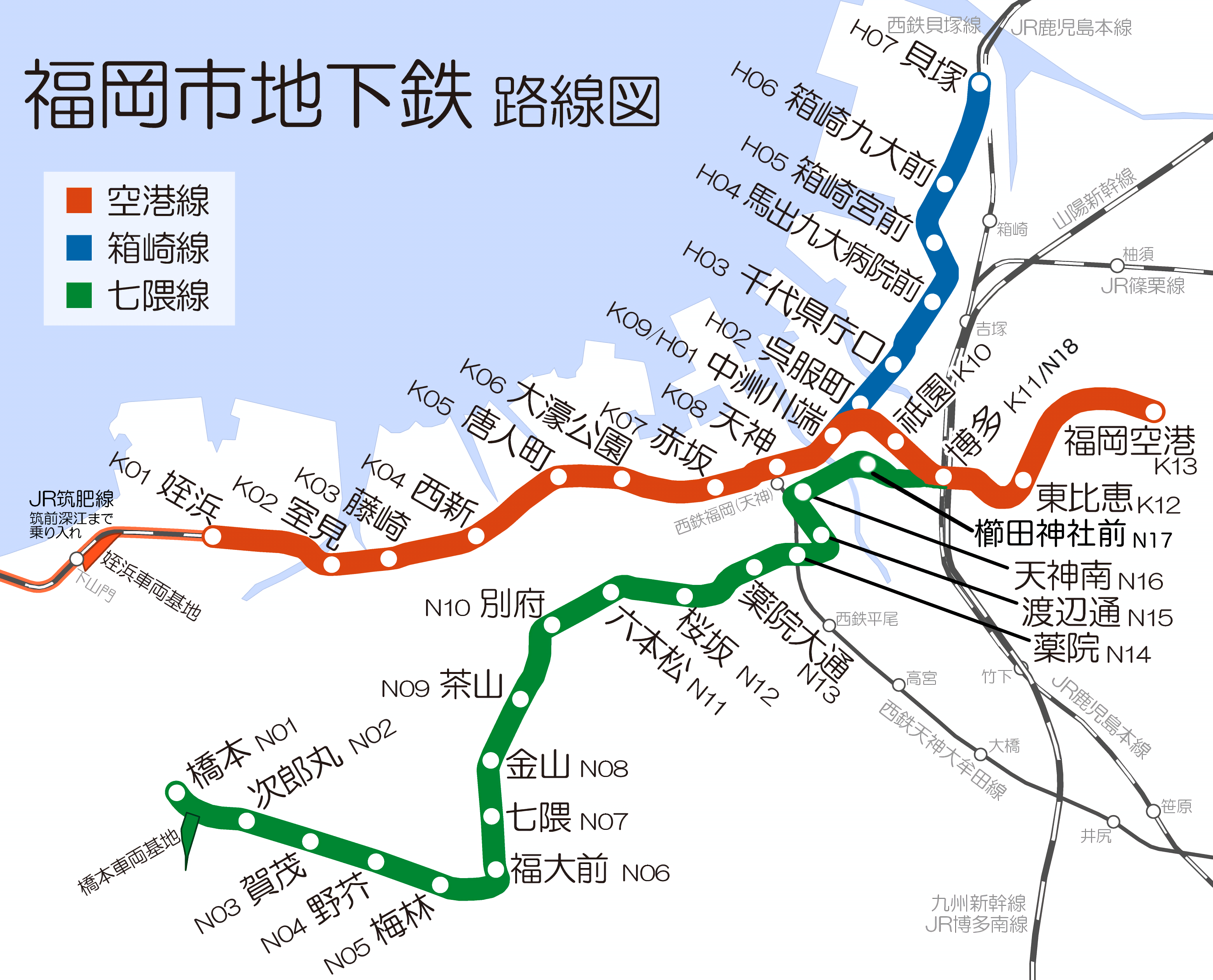
Orange: Airport Line
Blue: Hakozaki Line
Green: Nanakuma Line

The Fukuoka City Subway (福岡市地下鉄, Fukuoka-shi Chikatetsu) is a subway system that serves Fukuoka, Japan.

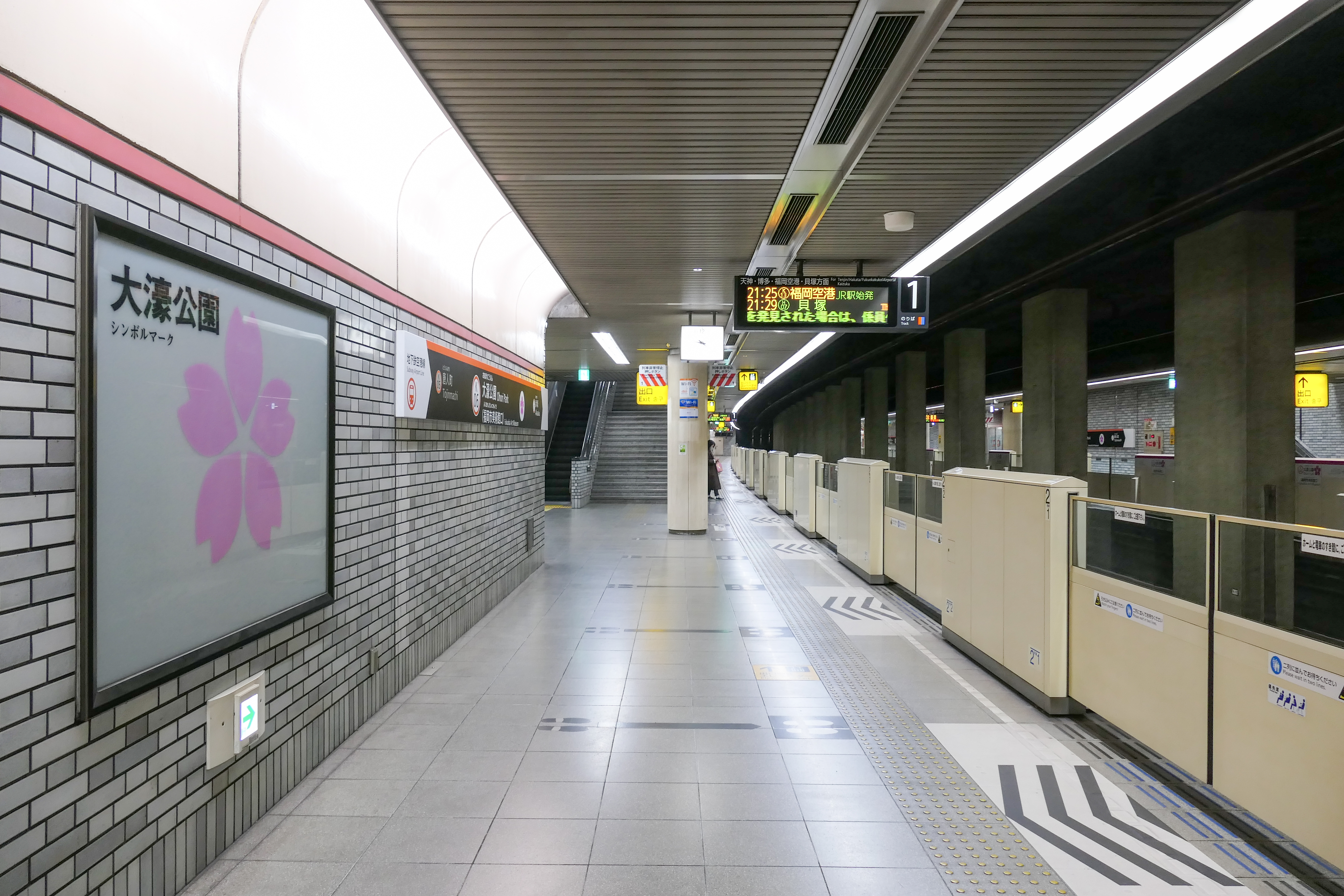
Ōhorikōen Station on the Airport Line

The lines are operated by the Fukuoka City Transportation Bureau (福岡市交通局, Fukuoka-shi Kōtsūkyoku). Unlike most other public operators in Japan, the company only operates subways without any bus lines.

All stations are equipped with automatic platform gates. All lines are automatically operated by ATO system, although drivers are used as a precaution. The lines introduced Hayakaken, a smart card system from March 2009. This superseded the prepaid magnetic card systems.

== History ==
=== Timeline ===
- June 20, 1961 - The Fukuoka City Master Plan (福岡市総合計画) includes a proposal for a high-speed circular railway within the city.
- December 22, 1973 - The Fukuoka City Council passes a resolution for the city to undertake a high-speed transportation project.
- August 22, 1974 - A local railway license is granted for the Meinohama–Hakata section (Line 1) and the Nakasu-Kawabata–Kaizuka section (Line 2).
- November 12, 1975 - Construction begins.
- July 26, 1981 - Airport Line section: Muromi - Tenjin opened.
- April 20, 1982 - Airport Line section: Tenjin - Nakatsu-Kawabata & Hakozaki Line section: Nakatsu-Kawabata - Gofukumachi commenced operations.
- March 22, 1983 - Airport Line section: Muromi - Meinohama & Nakatsu-Kawabata - Hakata opened.
- April 27, 1984 - Hakozaki Line section: Gofukumachi - Maidashi-Kyudaibyoinmae commenced service.
- March 03, 1985 - Airport Line Hakata station now at Hakata railway station
- January 31, 1986 - Hakozaki Line section: Maidashi-Kyudaibyoinmae - Hakozaki-Kyudaimae commenced service.
- November 12, 1986 - Hakozaki Line section: Hakozaki-Kyudaimae - Kaizuka commenced operations.
- March 03, 1993 - Airport Line section: Hakata - Fukuoka Airport opened to public.
- February 03, 2005 - Nanakuma Line section: Hashimoto - Tenjin-minami opened.
- March 27, 2023 - Nanakuma Line section: Tenjin-minami - Hakata opened.

== Lines ==
The Fukuoka City Subway has three lines; the Airport Line, the Hakozaki Line, and the Nanakuma Line.

Hakata and Nakasu-Kawabata stations are counted twice (as Kūkō-Nanakuma and Kūkō-Hakozaki interchanges, respectively). The total number of individual stations is therefore 36.

Name	Line color	Line icon	Mark	Line	First Opened	Last Extension	Length	Stations	Gauge	Train Length
Airport Line	Orange		K	Line 1	1981	1993	13.1 km (8.1 mi)	13	1,067 mm (3 ft 6 in)	6 cars
Hakozaki Line	Blue		H	Line 2	1982	1986	4.7 km (2.9 mi)	7	1,067 mm (3 ft 6 in)	6 cars
Nanakuma Line	Green		N	Line 3	2005	2023	13.6 km (8.5 mi)	18	1,435 mm (4 ft 8 1/2 in)	4 cars

== Airport rail link ==
Visitors traveling to Fukuoka by Shinkansen (bullet train) disembark at JR Hakata Station. They can then transfer to the Fukuoka City Subway system by changing to Hakata Subway station, located under JR Hakata station. Fukuoka Airport is also linked to the Fukuoka City Subway with the Airport Line, making it the only subway line in Japan that directly links to an airport. (Note: The Toei Asakusa Line connects Narita and Haneda airports, serving Tokyo, via through service.) Downtown Fukuoka city can be reached in about 10 minutes by subway, making Fukuoka Airport one of the most accessible major-city airports in the world.

== Stations ==
=== Station logos ===
Fukuoka City Subway employs unique logos (symbol mark and symbol color) for each station, much like Mexico City Metro. For example, Fukuoka Airport Station, has a logo symbolizing an airplane. The symbol marks of the Airport and Hakozaki Line stations were designed by Isao Nisijima, with those of Nanakuma Line stations being designed by his son Masayuki Nisijima, building on his father's posthumous works.

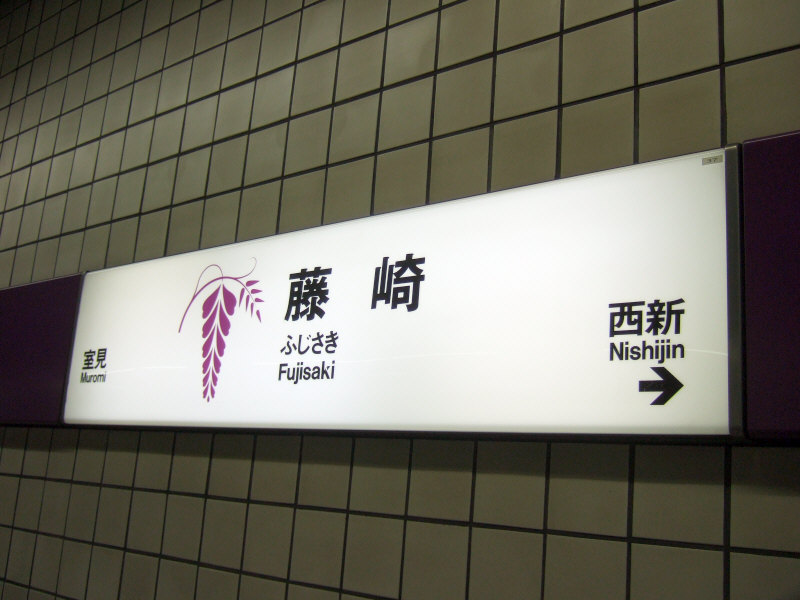
Fujisaki Station sign - symbol is a wisteria flower.

== Rolling stock ==
=== Airport Line/Hakozaki Line ===
- 1000N series
- 2000N series
- 4000 series

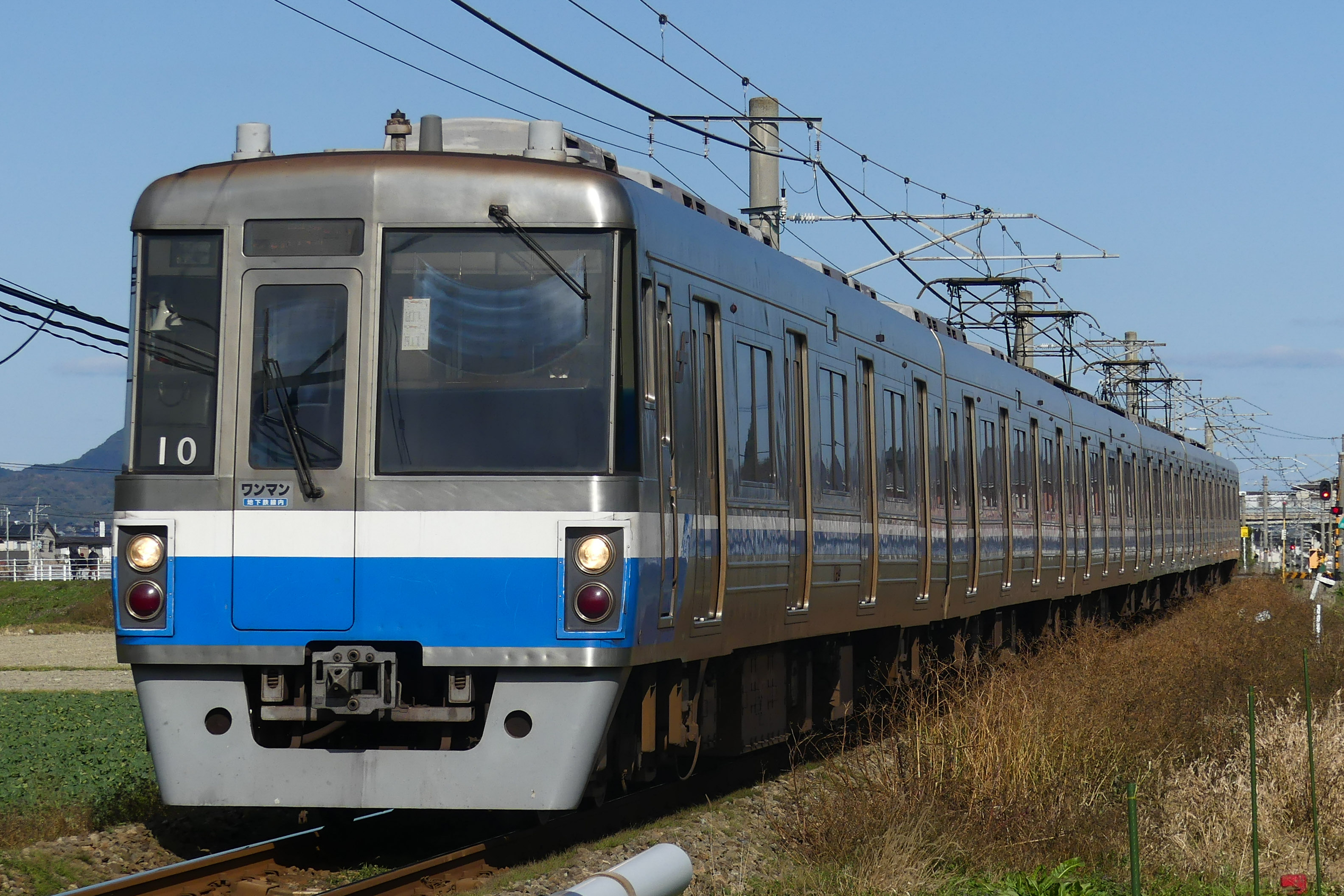
1000N series

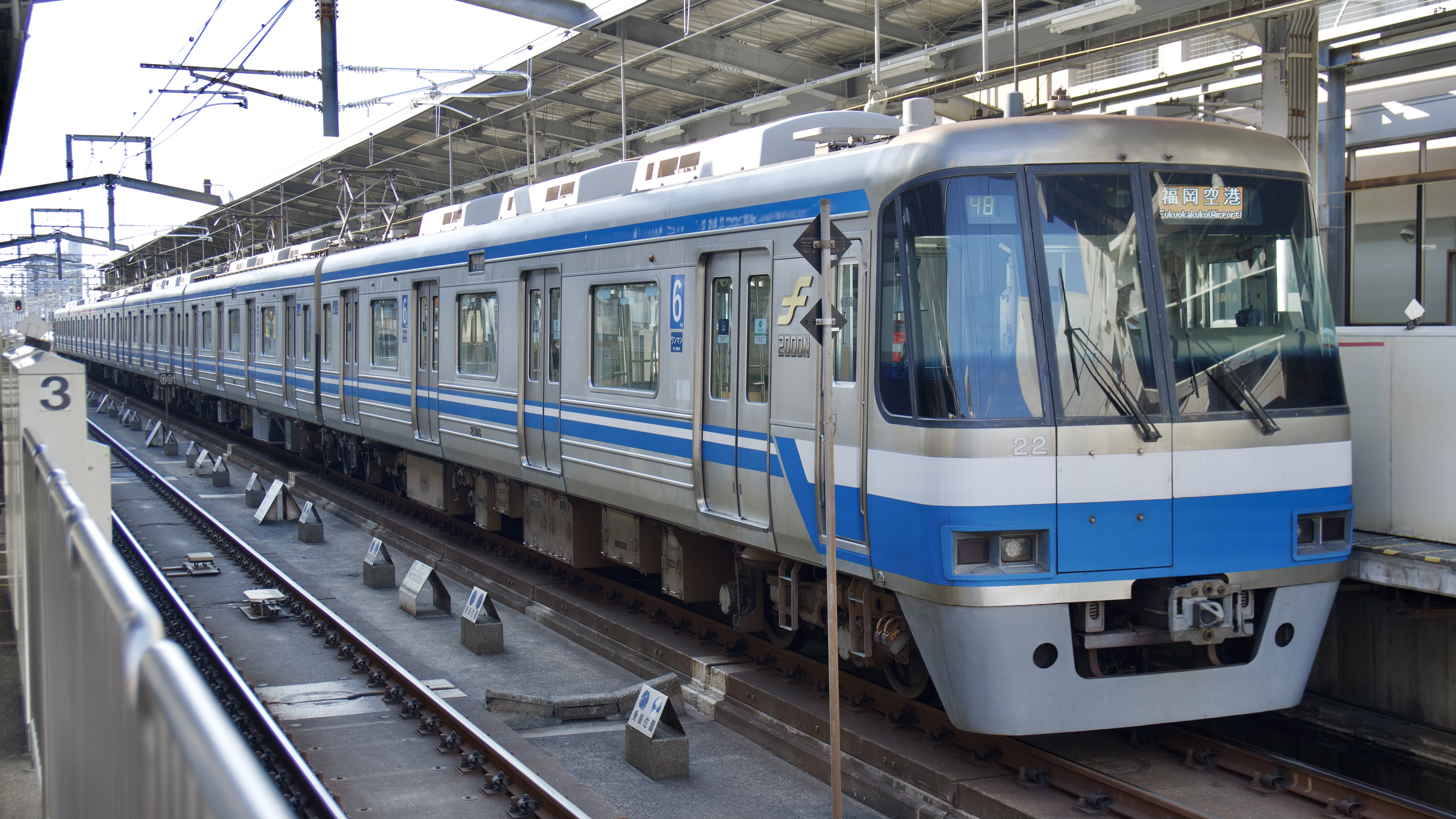
2000N series

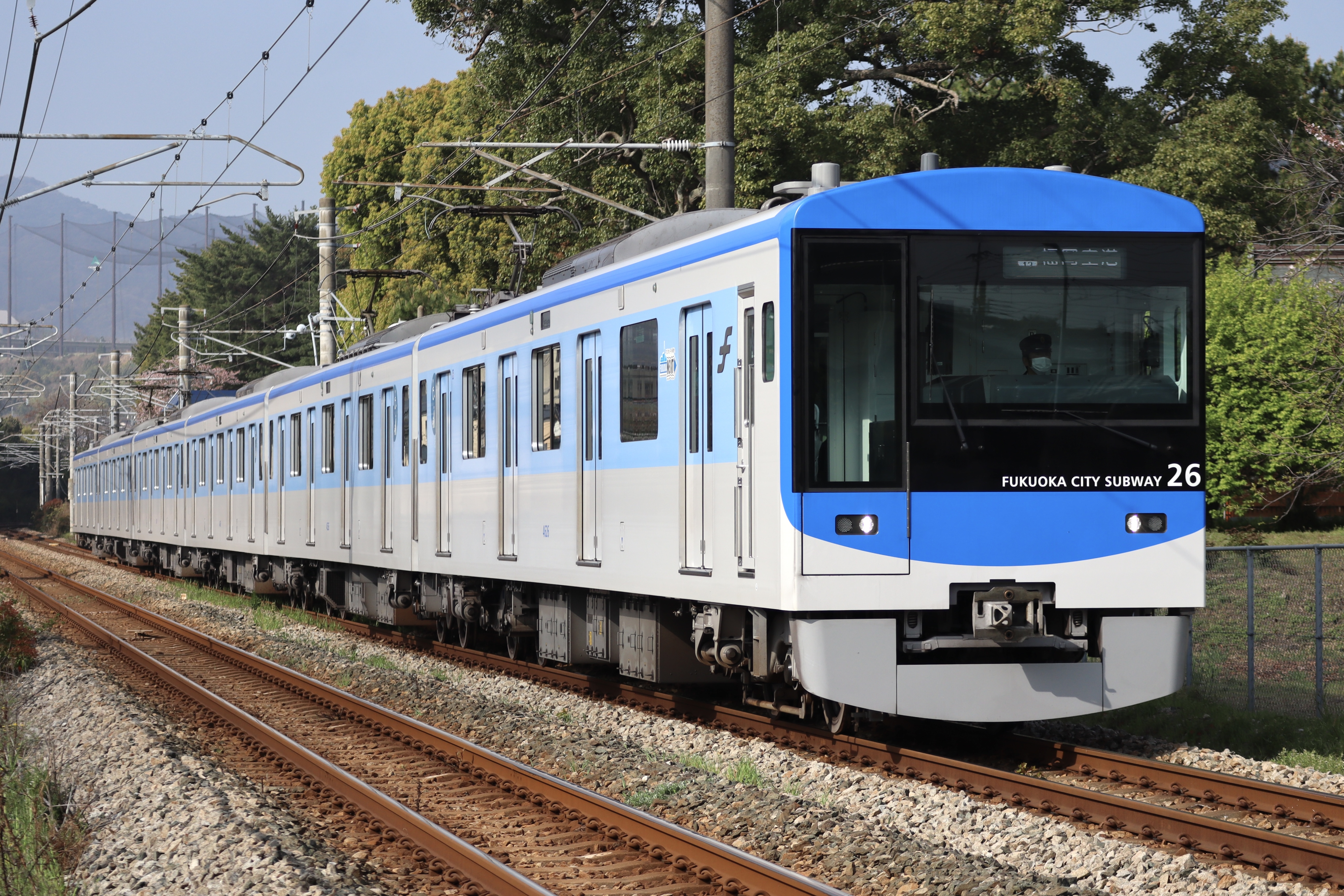
4000 series

=== Nanakuma Line ===
- 3000 series (3000A series)

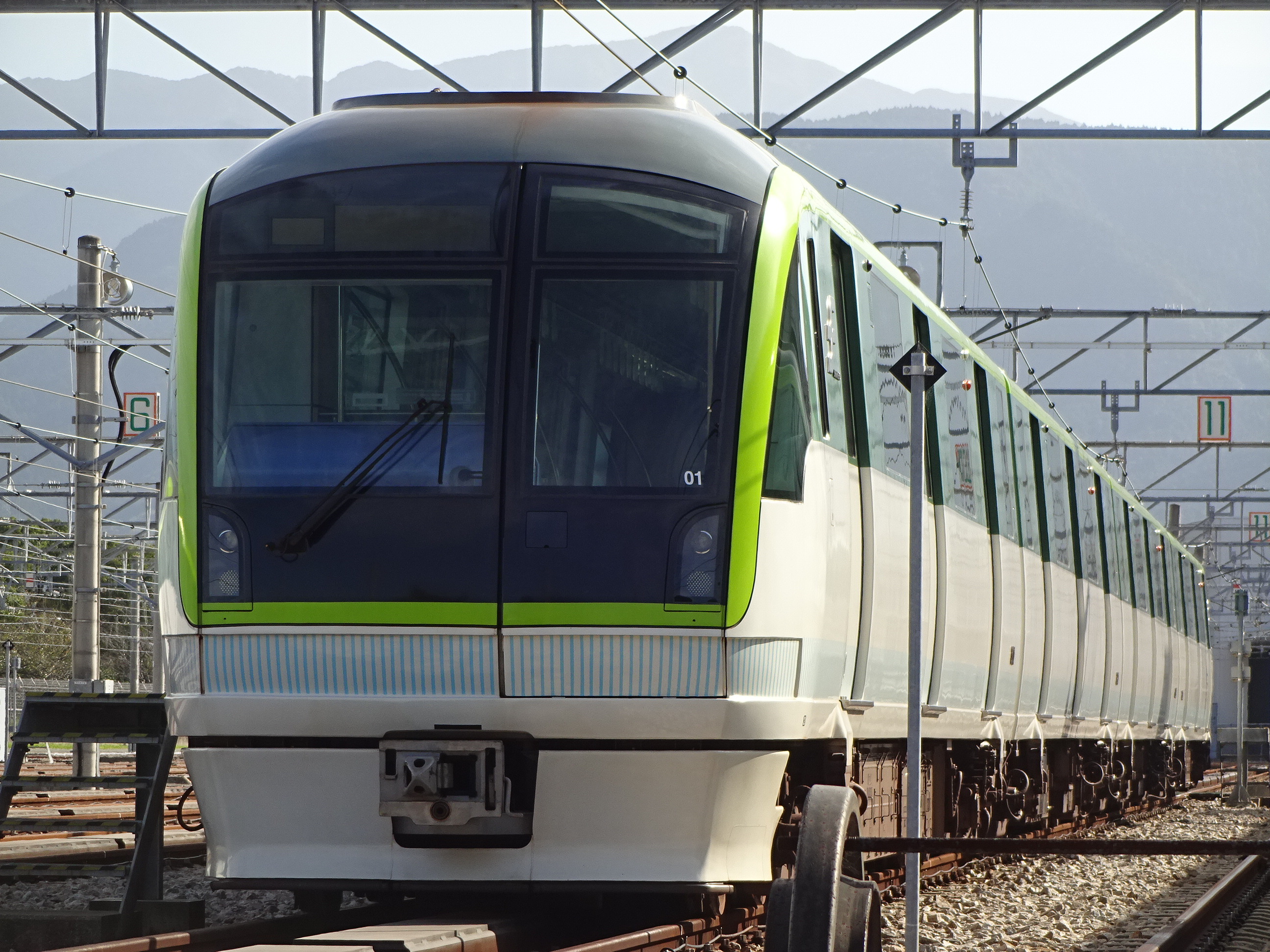
3000 series

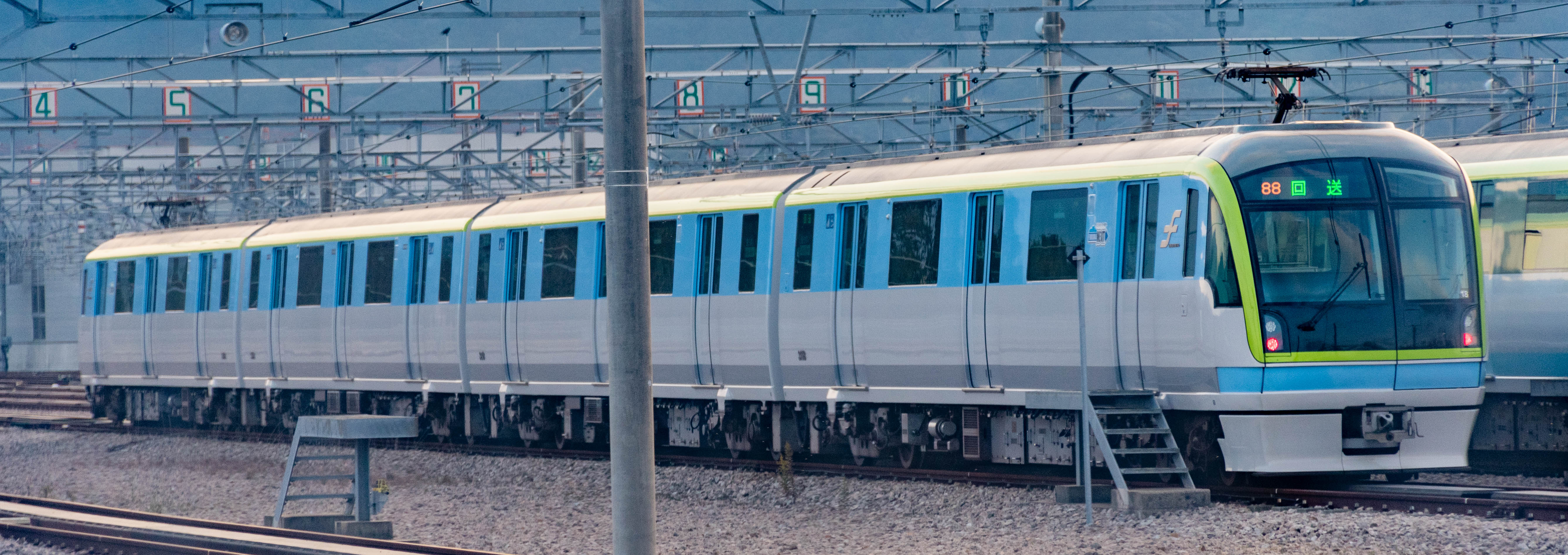
3000A series

== Fares ==
Ticket prices for the subway lines are determined by the distance traveled (¥200-340). Tickets for the subway can be purchased at all subway station ticket machines.

=== Special tickets ===
==== Magnetic cards ====
- One Day Pass (一日乗車券, Ichinichi jōshaken) – unlimited travel for one day
  - Airport Line, Nanakuma Line, Hakozaki Line
    - ¥640
    - Chikamaru Ticket (ちかまるきっぷ, Chikamaru-kippu), priced at ¥100, is available only to children during school vacation periods. A coupon is attached to the ticket which may be exchanged for a McDonald's hamburger.
- Two Day Pass (二日乗車券, Futsuka jōshaken) – unlimited travel for two days, limited to foreign tourists only
  - Airport Line, Nanakuma Line, Hakozaki Line
    - ¥720
- Commuter Pass (定期券, Teikiken)
  - Airport Line, Nanakuma Line, Hakozaki Line
- Chika Pass (ちかパス, Chika-pasu) – unlimited travel
  - Airport Line, Nanakuma Line, Hakozaki Line
    - 1 Month: ¥12,000
    - 3 Months: ¥34,200
    - 6 Months: ¥64,800

==== Contactless smart card ====
- Hayakaken (はやかけん, Hayakaken)
  - Airport Line, Nanakuma Line, Hakozaki Line

Hayakaken is a rechargeable contactless smart card for the Fukuoka City Subway. It can also be used as a Commuter Pass (Chika Pass included) on subway lines. Starting in 2010, it became compatible with Nishi-Nippon Railroad's nimoca, JR Kyushu's SUGOCA and JR East's Suica. As of March 2013, it also became compatible with other major IC cards as part of the Nationwide Mutual Usage Service.

== Fukuoka City Transportation Bureau ==
Fukuoka City Transportation Bureau (福岡市交通局, Fukuoka-shi Kōtsūkyoku) is a public organization of transportation in Fukuoka, Japan. The organization operates subways. It was founded in 1973.

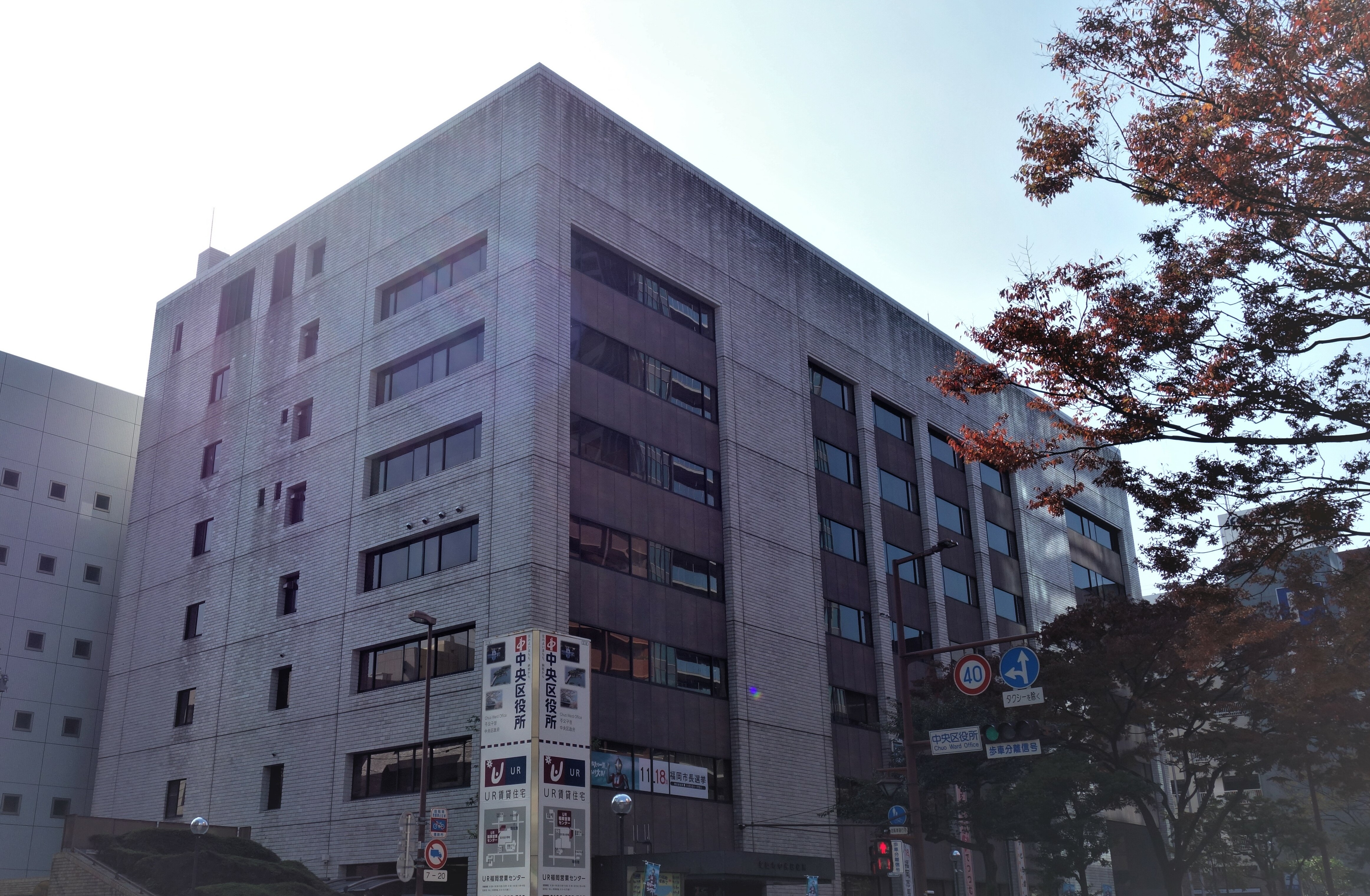
Fukuoka City Transportation Bureau headquarters, Chūō-ku, Fukuoka.

== See also ==
- Transport in Fukuoka-Kitakyūshū
- List of metro systems
