= Fukudai-mae Station =

Metro station in Fukuoka, Japan

N06 Fukudai-mae Station 福大前駅
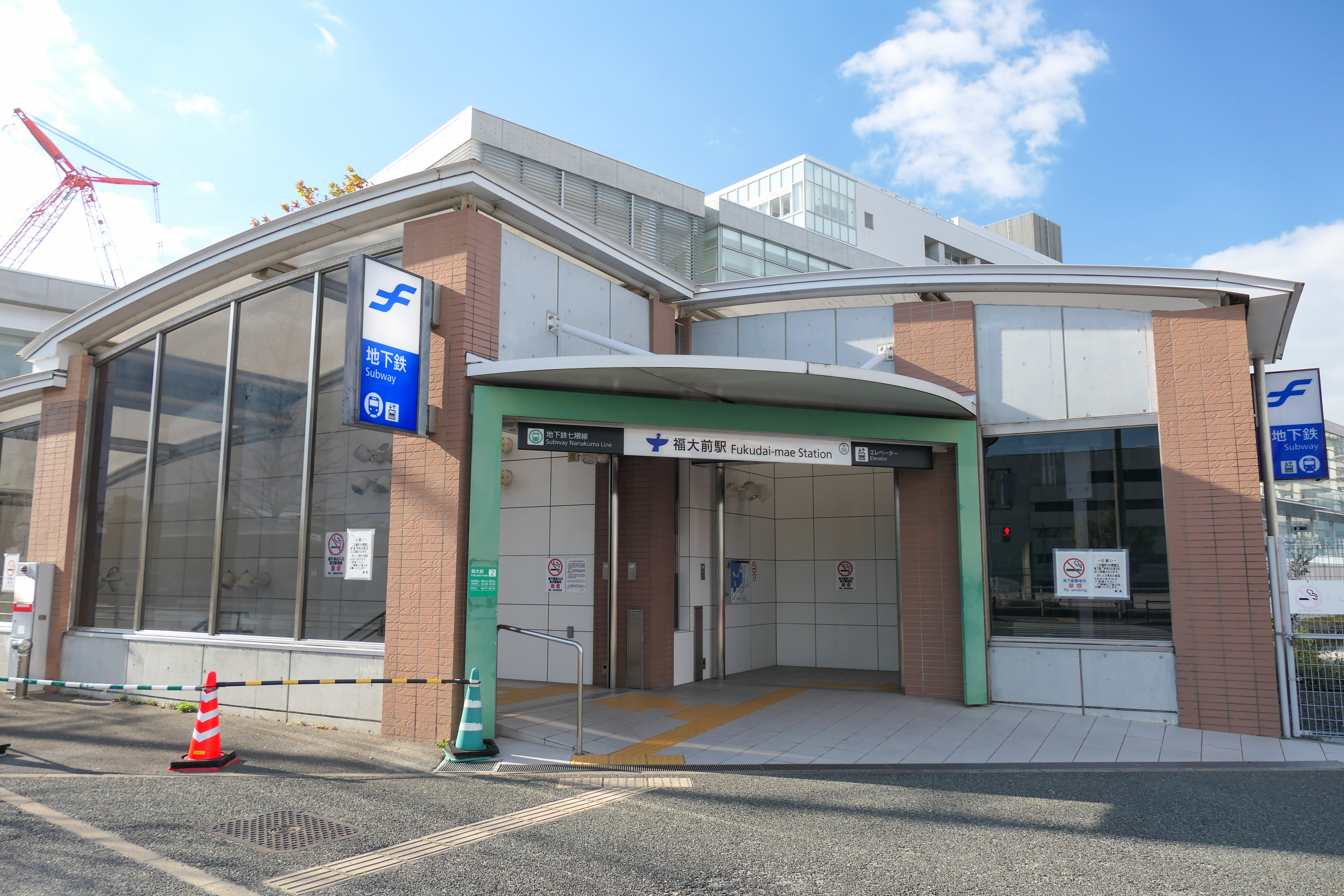

General information
- Location: Jōnan, Fukuoka, Fukuoka; Japan
- Coordinates: 33.5473°N 130.3621°E
- System: Fukuoka City Subway station
- Operator: Fukuoka City Subway
- Line: Nanakuma Line
- Platforms: 1 island platform

Construction
- Structure type: Underground

Other information
- Station code: N06

History
- Opened: February 3, 2005; 21 years ago

Passengers
- 2023: 6,754 daily

Services
Preceding station	Fukuoka City Subway	Following station
Umebayashi N05 towards Hashimoto	Nanakuma Line	Nanakuma N07 towards Hakata
Location

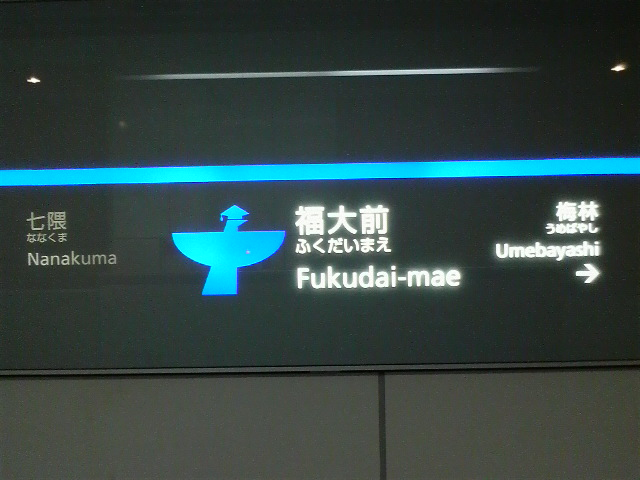
Station symbol

Fukudai-mae Station (福大前駅, Fukudai-mae-eki) is a subway station on the Fukuoka City Subway Nanakuma Line in Jōnan-ku, Fukuoka in Japan. Its station symbol depicts a black kite wearing a student cap, based on Fukuoka University's cheer song "Nanakuma Tonbi".

== Lines ==
- Fukuoka City Subway
  - Nanakuma Line

== Platforms ==
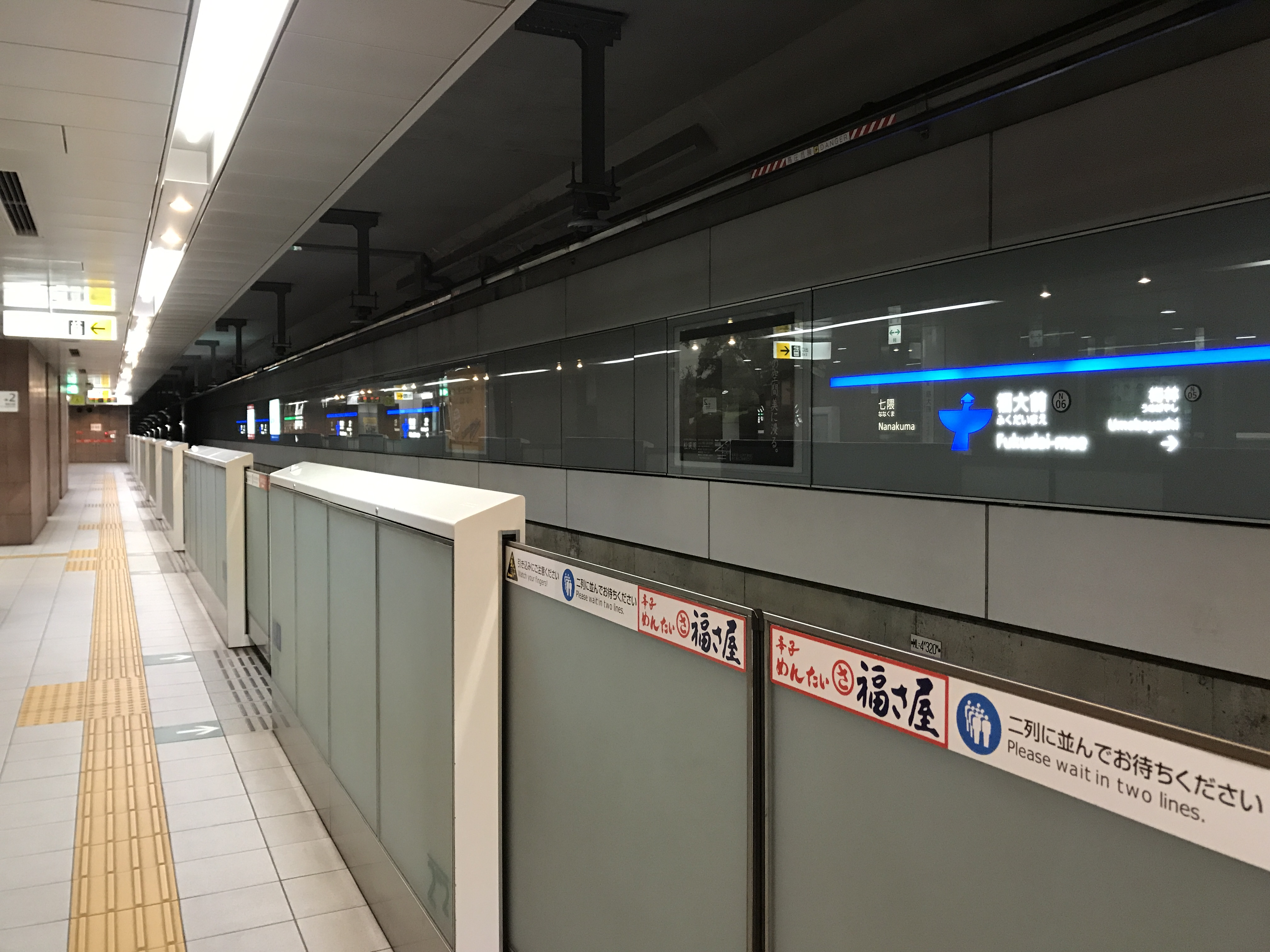
The island platform

The station has an underground island platform serving two tracks.

1	■ Nanakuma Line	for Hakata
2	■ Nanakuma Line	for Hashimoto

== Surrounding area ==
- Fukuoka University
- Fukuoka University Hospital
  - Fukuoka University Graduate School of Nursing
- Nishitetsu bus stop

== History ==
- 3 February 2005: Station opened, with the Nanakuma Line section between Hashimoto and Tenjin-minami.

== Gallery ==
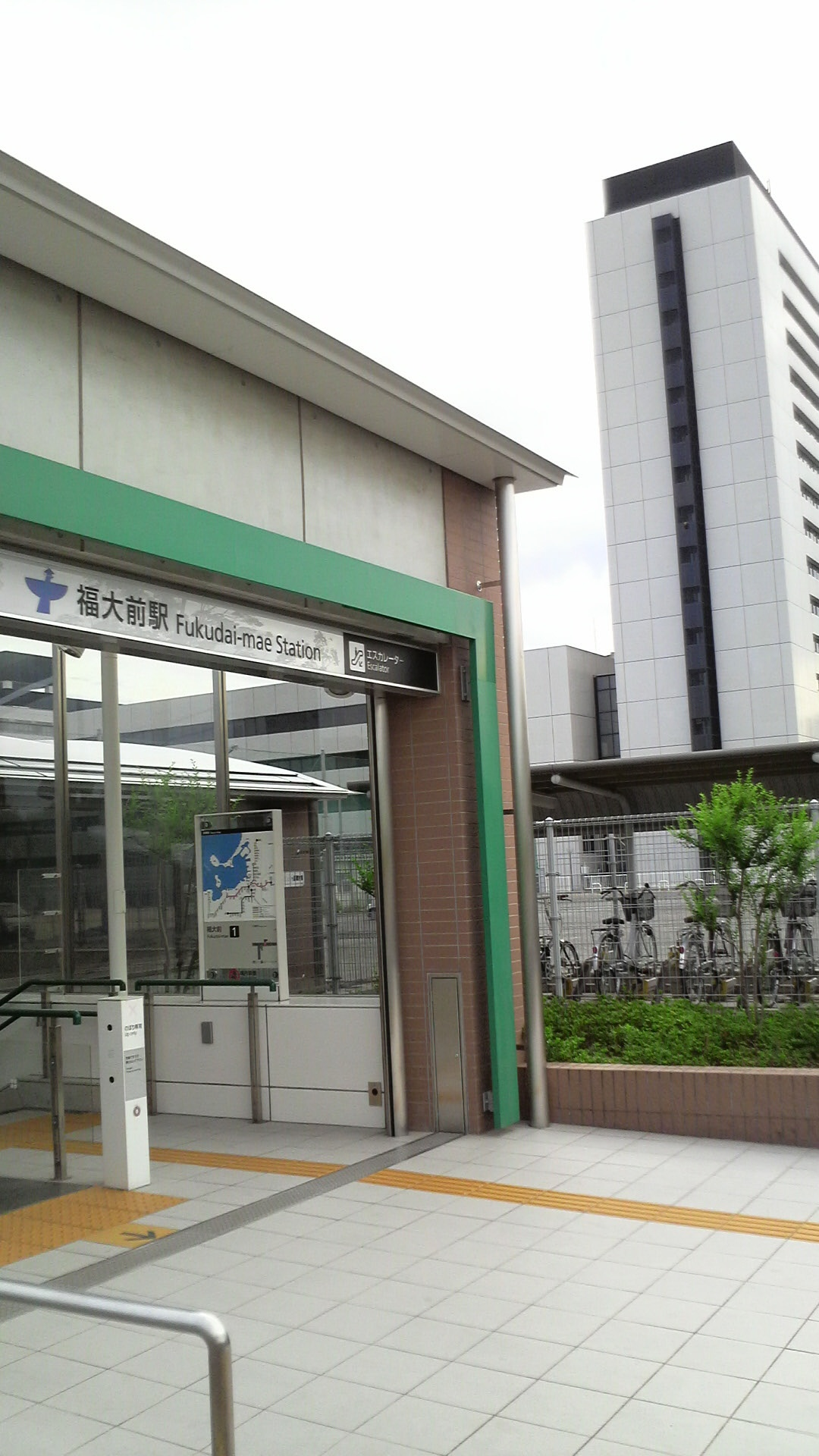
Station exterior

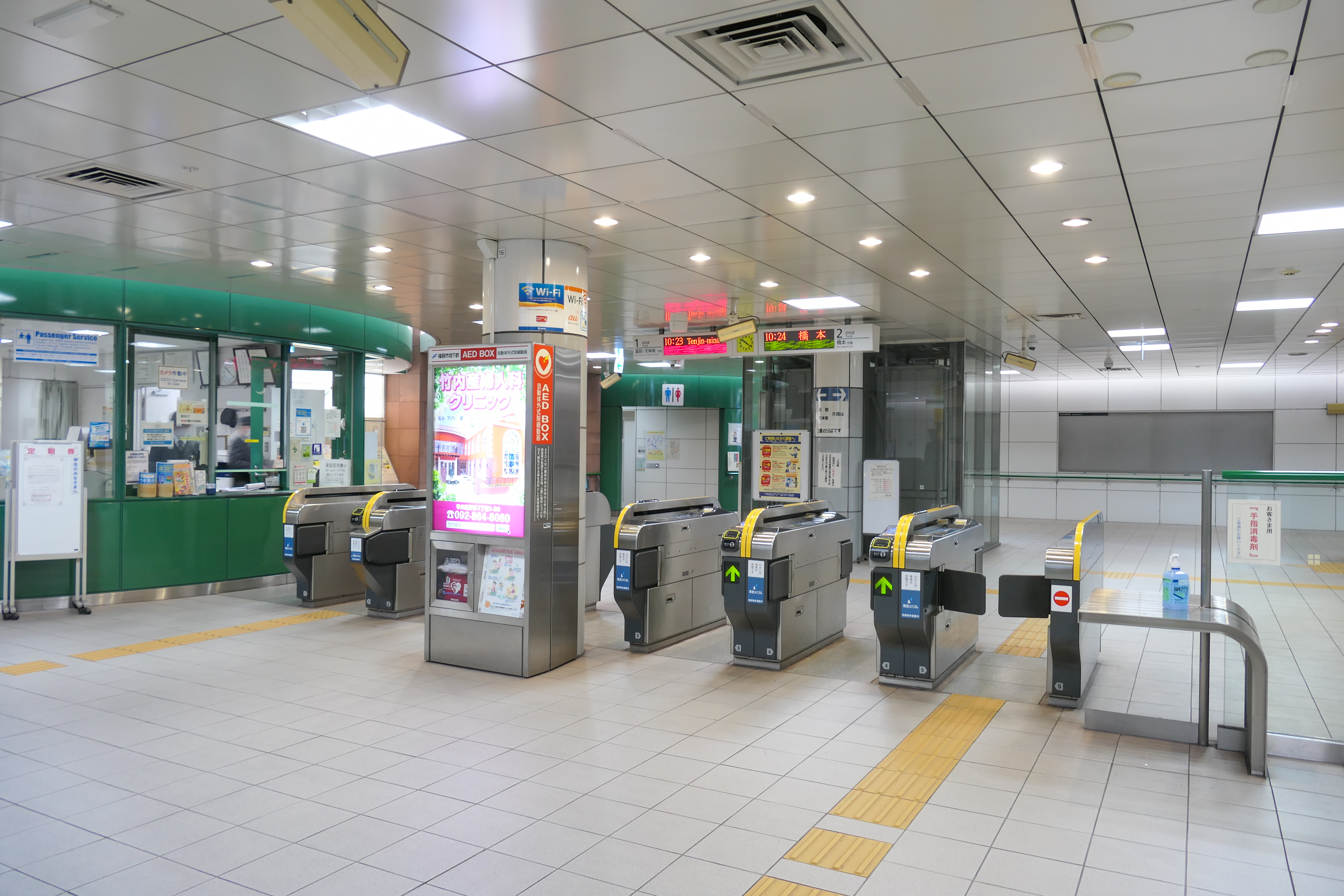
Ticket gates

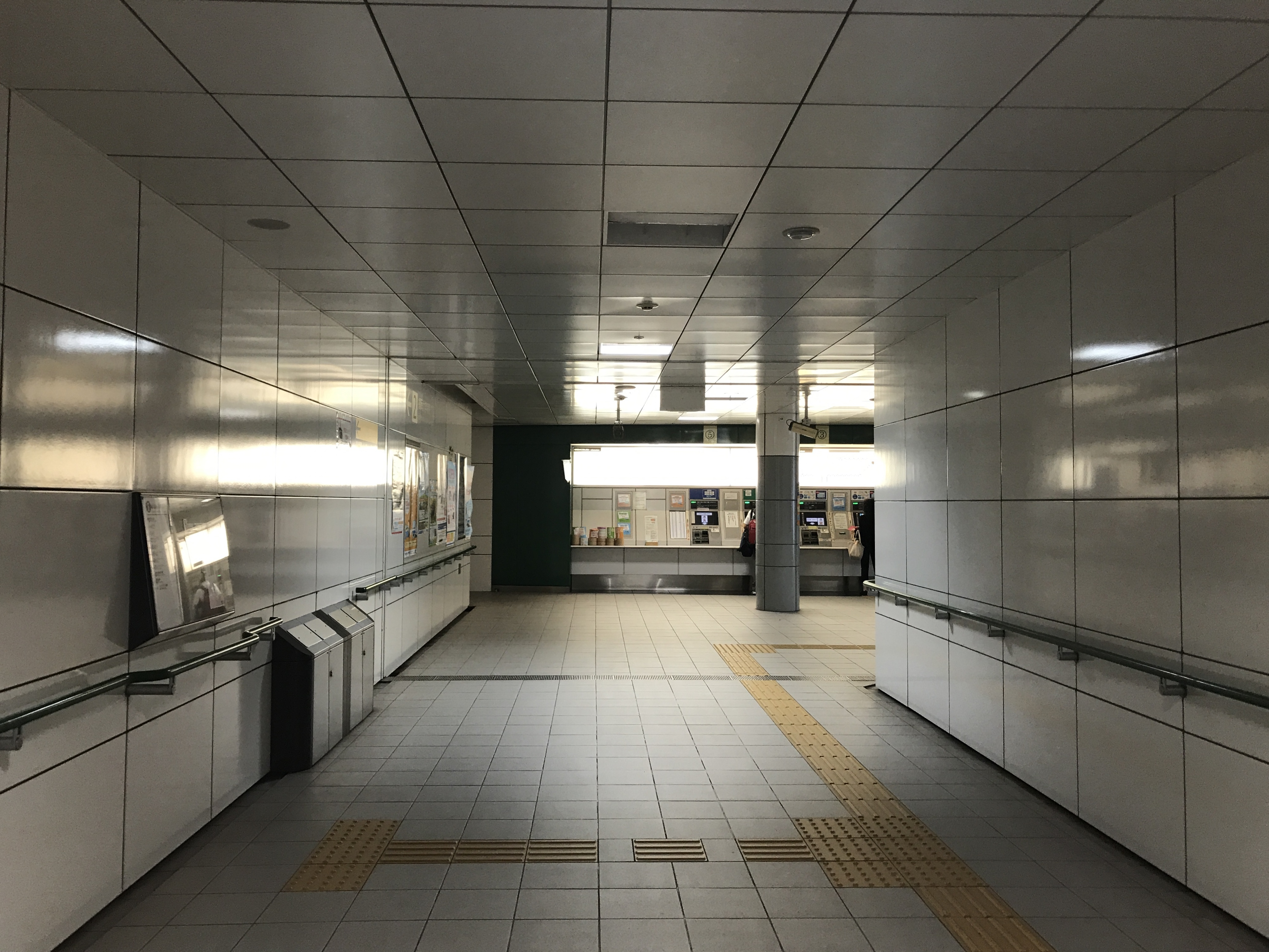
Interior view

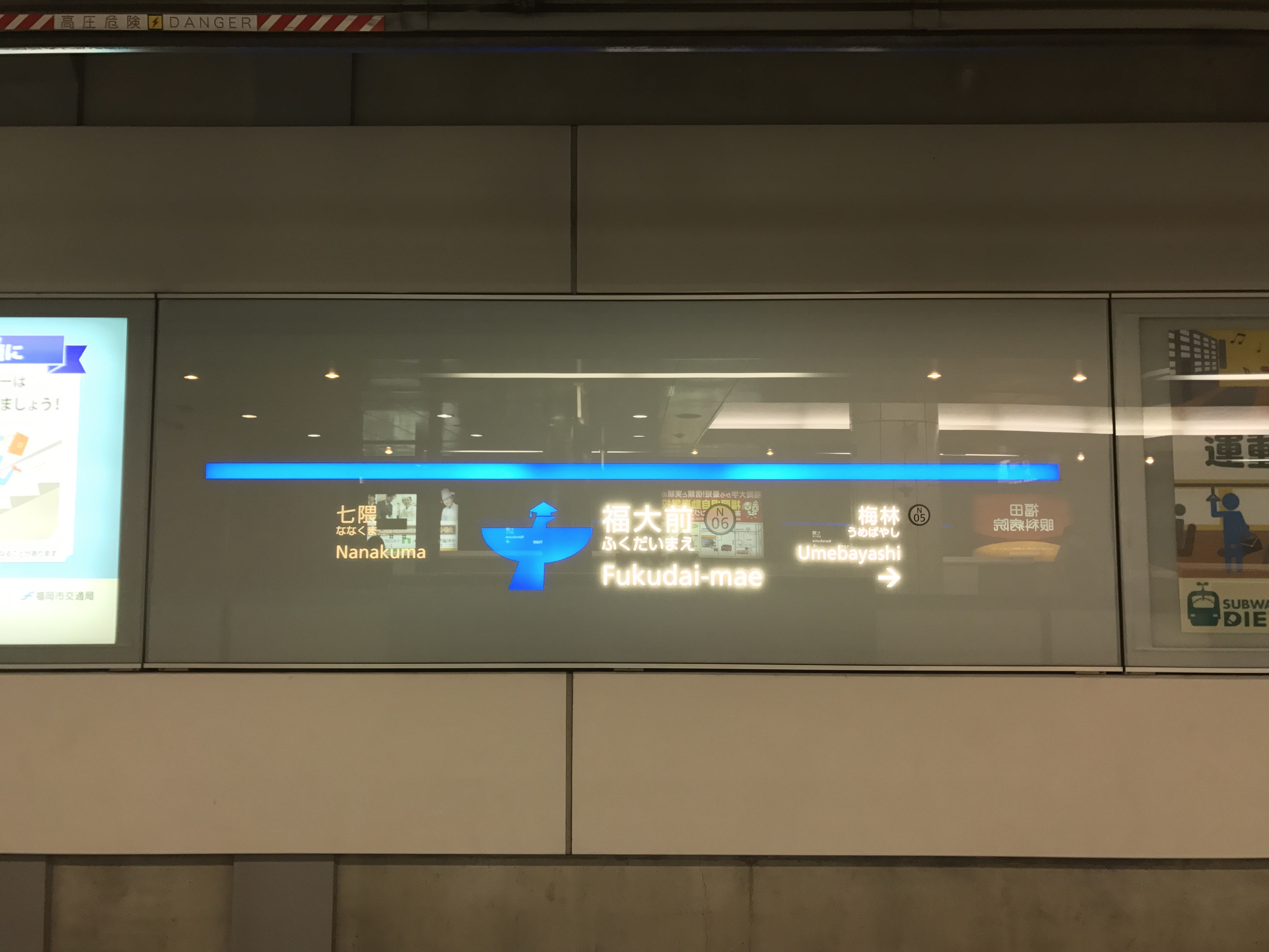
Platform name sign
