= Nanakuma Station =

Metro station in Fukuoka, Japan

Coordinates: 33.5528°N 130.3614°E

N07 Nanakuma Station 七隈駅
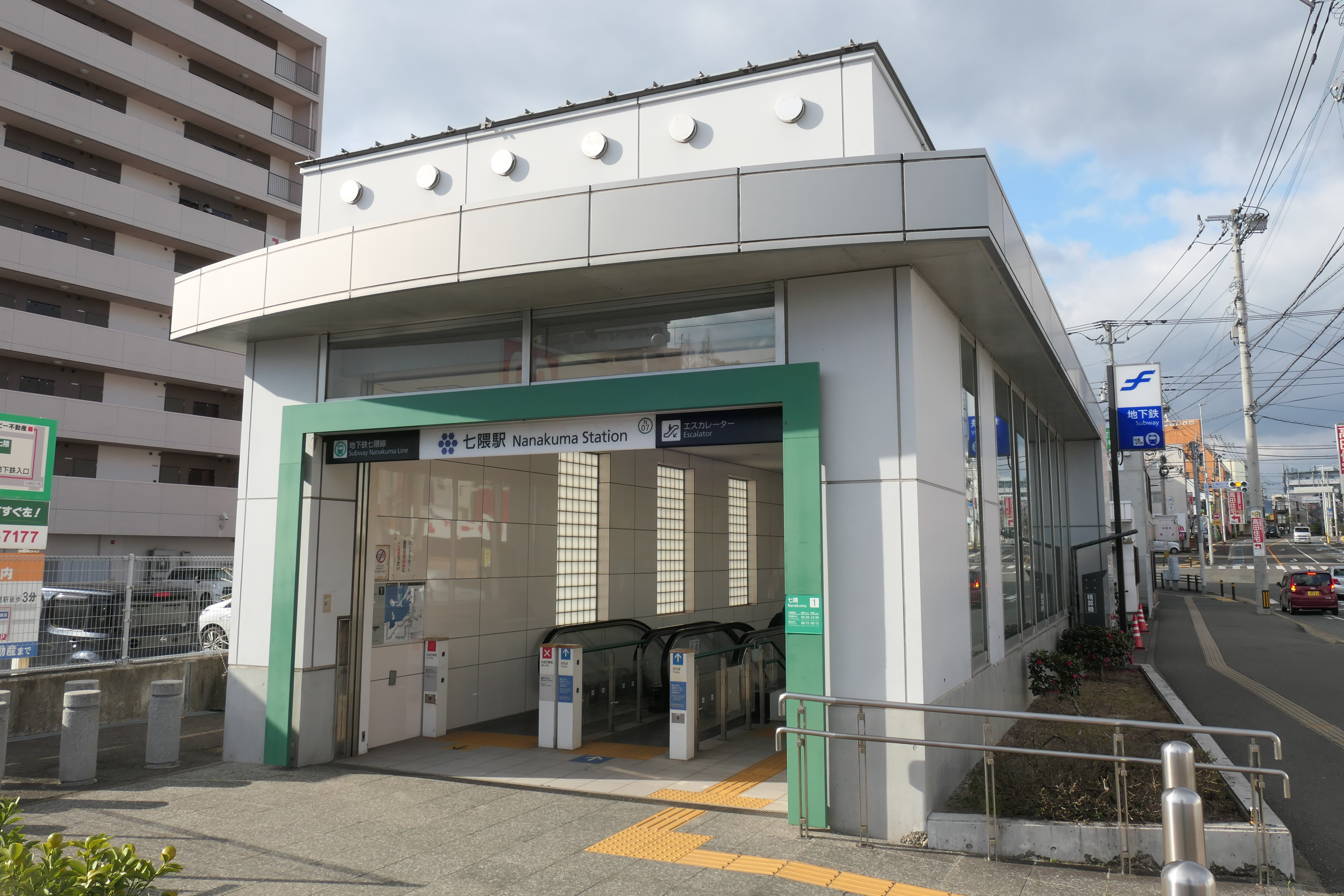

General information
- Location: Jōnan, Fukuoka, Fukuoka; Japan
- System: Fukuoka City Subway station
- Operator: Fukuoka City Subway
- Line: Nanakuma Line

Other information
- Station code: N07

History
- Opened: February 3, 2005; 21 years ago

Passengers
- 2006: 2,605 daily

Services
Preceding station	Fukuoka City Subway	Following station
Fukudaimae N06 towards Hashimoto	Nanakuma Line	Kanayama N08 towards Hakata
Location

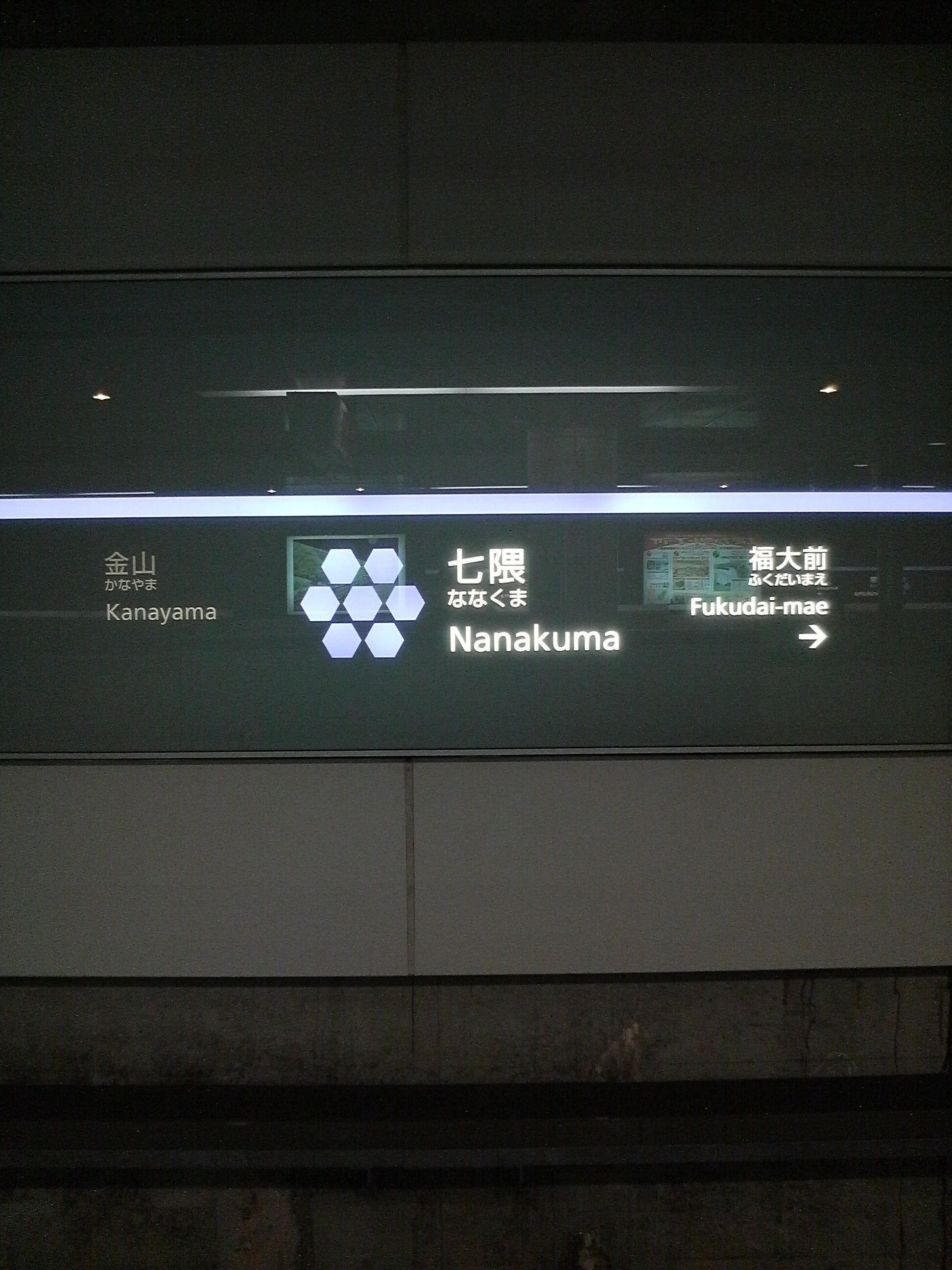
Station symbol

Nanakuma Station (七隈駅) is a subway station on the Fukuoka City Subway Nanakuma Line in Jōnan-ku, Fukuoka, Japan. The station symbol has seven hexagon-shaped wheels in violet, inspired by the former station name, Nanaguruma (七車 (ななぐるま)).

== Lines ==
- Fukuoka City Subway
  - Nanakuma Line

== Platforms ==
1	■ Nanakuma Line	for Hakata
2	■ Nanakuma Line	for Hashimoto

== History ==
- February 3, 2005: Opening of the station
