= Kuroda Nagatomo =

Japanese noble

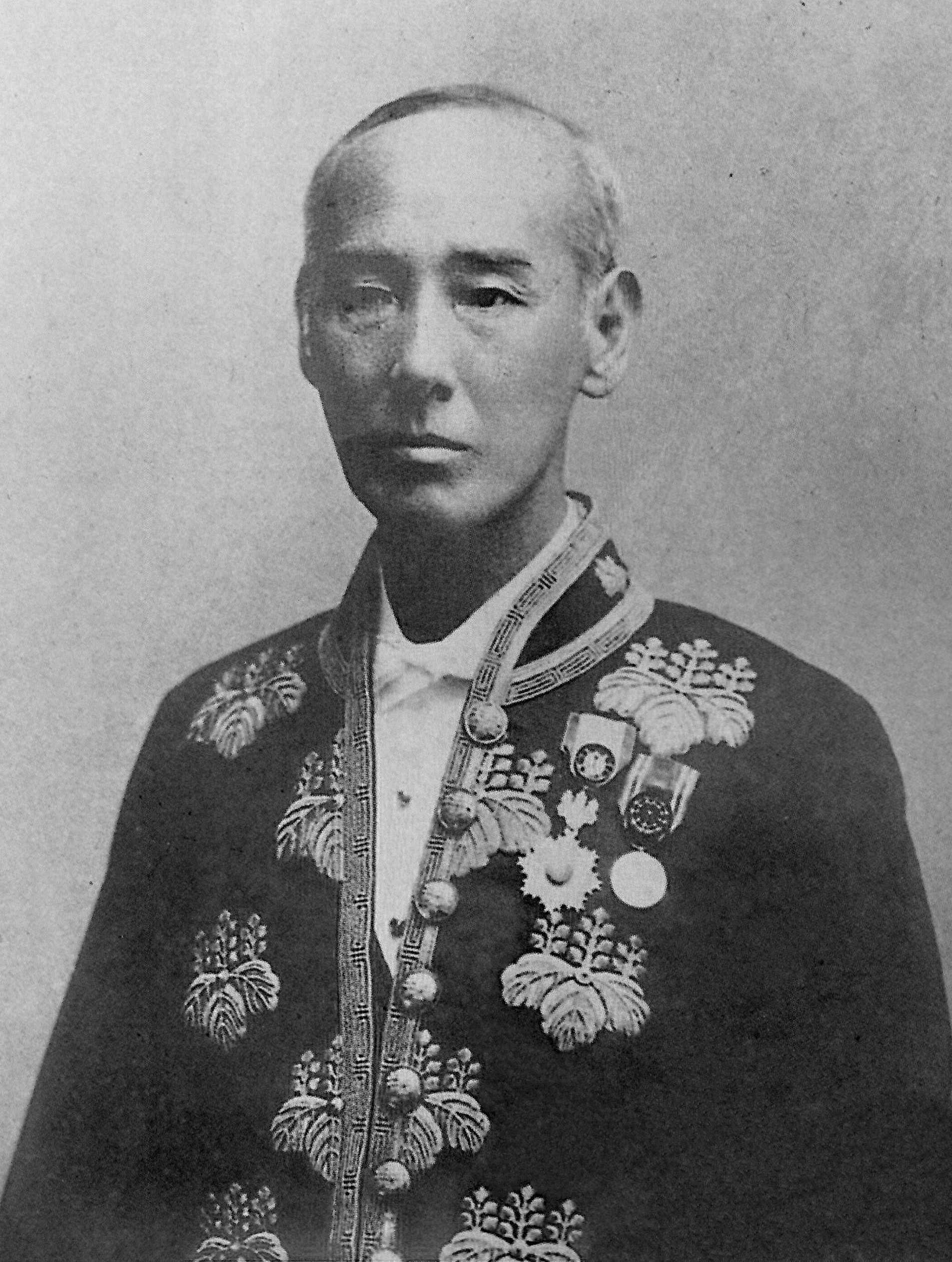
Kuroda Nagatomo

Kuroda Nagatomo (黒田 長知; February 2, 1838 – January 7, 1902) was a Japanese samurai of the late Edo period, who served as the last daimyō of Fukuoka han. He was adopted into the family and was born as Tatewaka (建若), the second son of Tōdō Takayuki, lord of the Tsu han. A pro-Chōshū figure during the tumultuous Bakumatsu era, he allied with the new government in the Boshin War. Nagatomo was named governor of the newly created Fukuoka Prefecture in 1869. In 1871, the government discovered a counterfeiting operation occurring on the castle grounds with the knowledge of the prefectural government. As a result, Nagatomo was replaced as governor by Prince Arisugawa Taruhito. Nagatomo was made a member of the new nobility in the Meiji period.

Nagatomo died in Tokyo in 1902, at age 65, passing on the headship to his son Kuroda Nagashige in 1878.

== Family ==
- Father: Tōdō Takayuki
- Mother: Myojin’in
- Foster Father: Kuroda Nagahiro
- Wife: Matsudaira Toyoko
- Concubines:
  - Nakamura-dono
  - Iwatani-dono
  - Toshiro-dono
  - Sumida-dono
  - Itakura-dono
  - Omiya-dono
- Children:
  - Kuroda Nagashige (1867–1939) by Toyoko
  - Kuroda Nagatoshi (1881-1944) by Toyoko
  - Sadako married Nabeshima Naomitsu by Toyoko
  - Junko
  - Kuroda Nagaatsu (1885-1963) by Toyoko

== Title ==
Preceded by Kuroda Nagahiro	Daimyō of Fukuoka; 1869–1871	Succeeded by Prince Arisugawa Taruhito
Preceded by Kuroda Nagahiro	Kuroda family head 1869–1878	Succeeded by Kuroda Nagashige
