= Kanayama Station (Fukuoka) =

Metro station in Fukuoka, Japan

Coordinates: 33°33′34″N 130°21′42″E

N08 Kanayama Station 金山駅
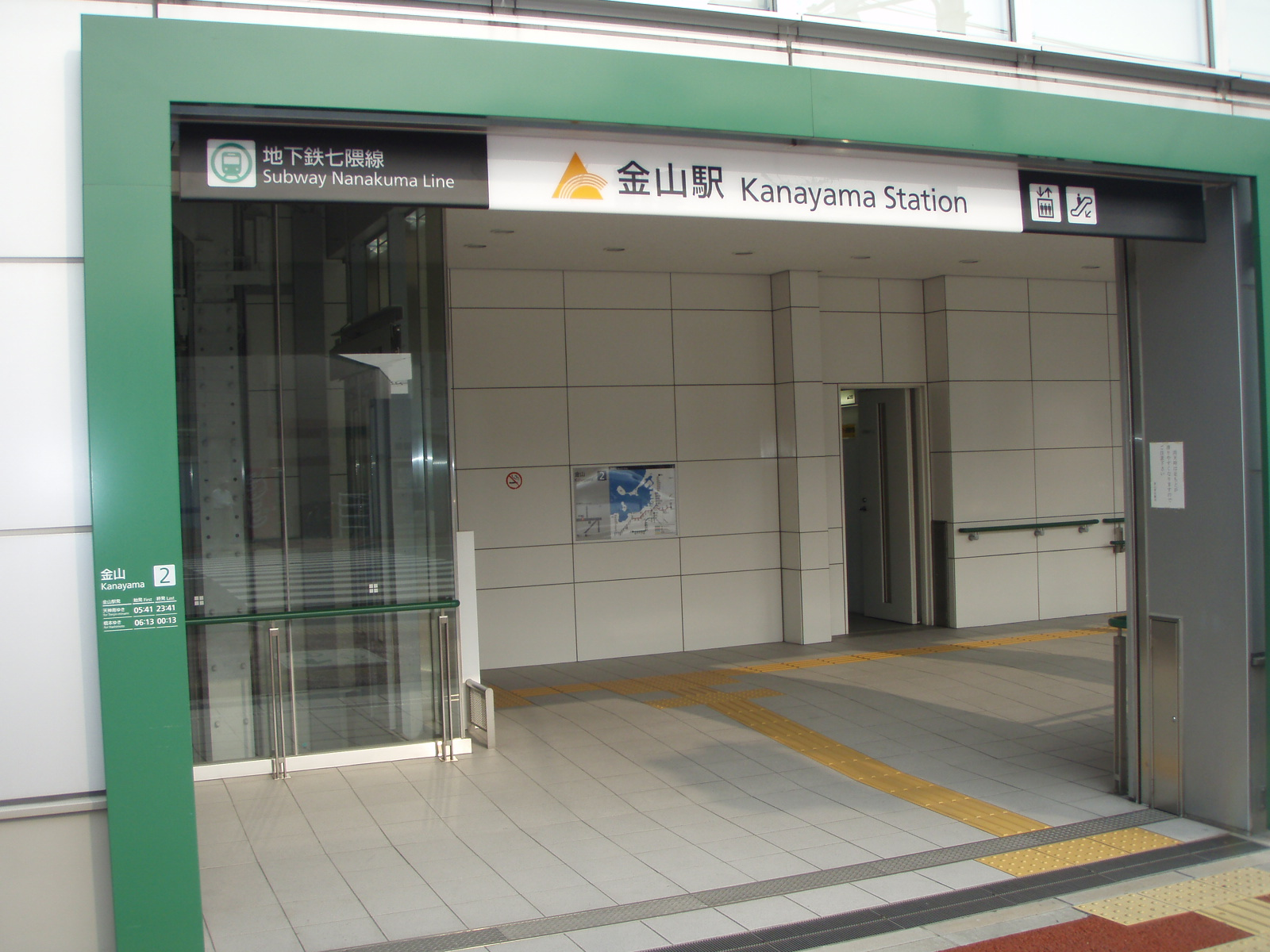

General information
- Location: Jōnan, Fukuoka, Fukuoka; Japan
- System: Fukuoka City Subway station
- Operator: Fukuoka City Subway
- Line: Nanakuma Line

Other information
- Station code: N08

History
- Opened: February 3, 2005; 21 years ago

Passengers
- 2006: 2,049 daily

Services
Preceding station	Fukuoka City Subway	Following station
Nanakuma N07 towards Hashimoto	Nanakuma Line	Chayama N09 towards Hakata
Location

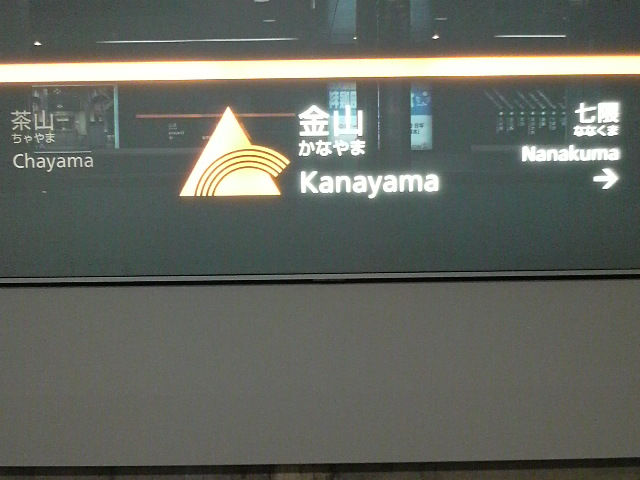
Station symbol

Kanayama Station (金山駅) is a subway station on the Fukuoka City Subway Nanakuma Line in Jōnan-ku, Fukuoka in Japan. Its station symbol is a picture of a rainbow in front of a triangle, creating a motif of the character 金 and a hill in orange.

== Lines ==
- Fukuoka City Subway
  - Nanakuma Line

== Platforms ==
1	■ Nanakuma Line	for Hakata
2	■ Nanakuma Line	for Hashimoto

== History ==
- February 3, 2005: Opening of the station
