= Chayama Station (Fukuoka) =

Metro station in Fukuoka, Japan

Coordinates: 33°33′58″N 130°21′56″E

N09 Chayama Station 茶山駅
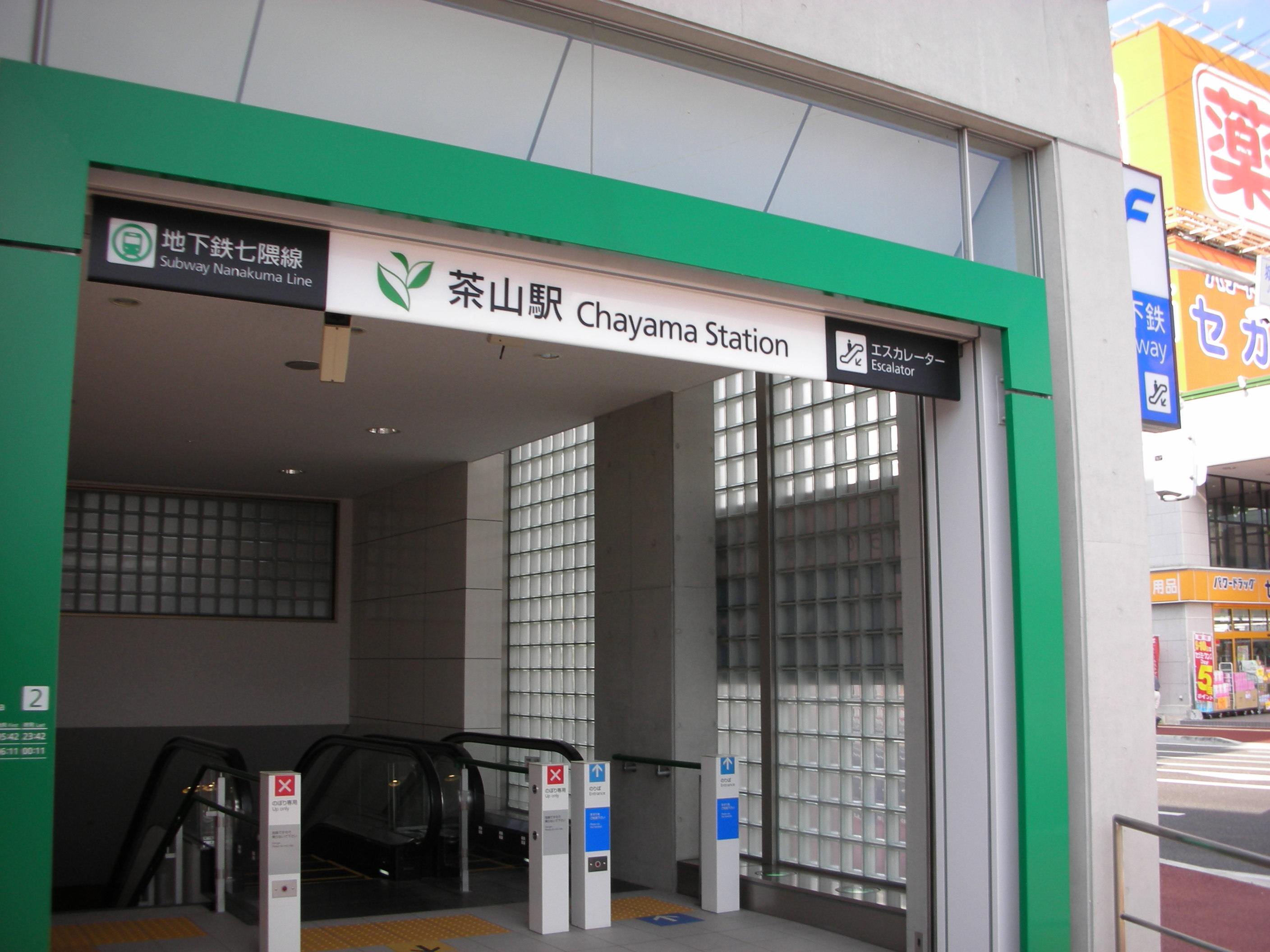

General information
- Location: Jōnan, Fukuoka, Fukuoka; Japan
- System: Fukuoka City Subway station
- Operator: Fukuoka City Subway
- Line: Nanakuma Line

Other information
- Station code: N09

History
- Opened: February 3, 2005; 21 years ago

Passengers
- 2006: 1,485 daily

Services
Preceding station	Fukuoka City Subway	Following station
Kanayama N08 towards Hashimoto	Nanakuma Line	Befu N10 towards Hakata
Location

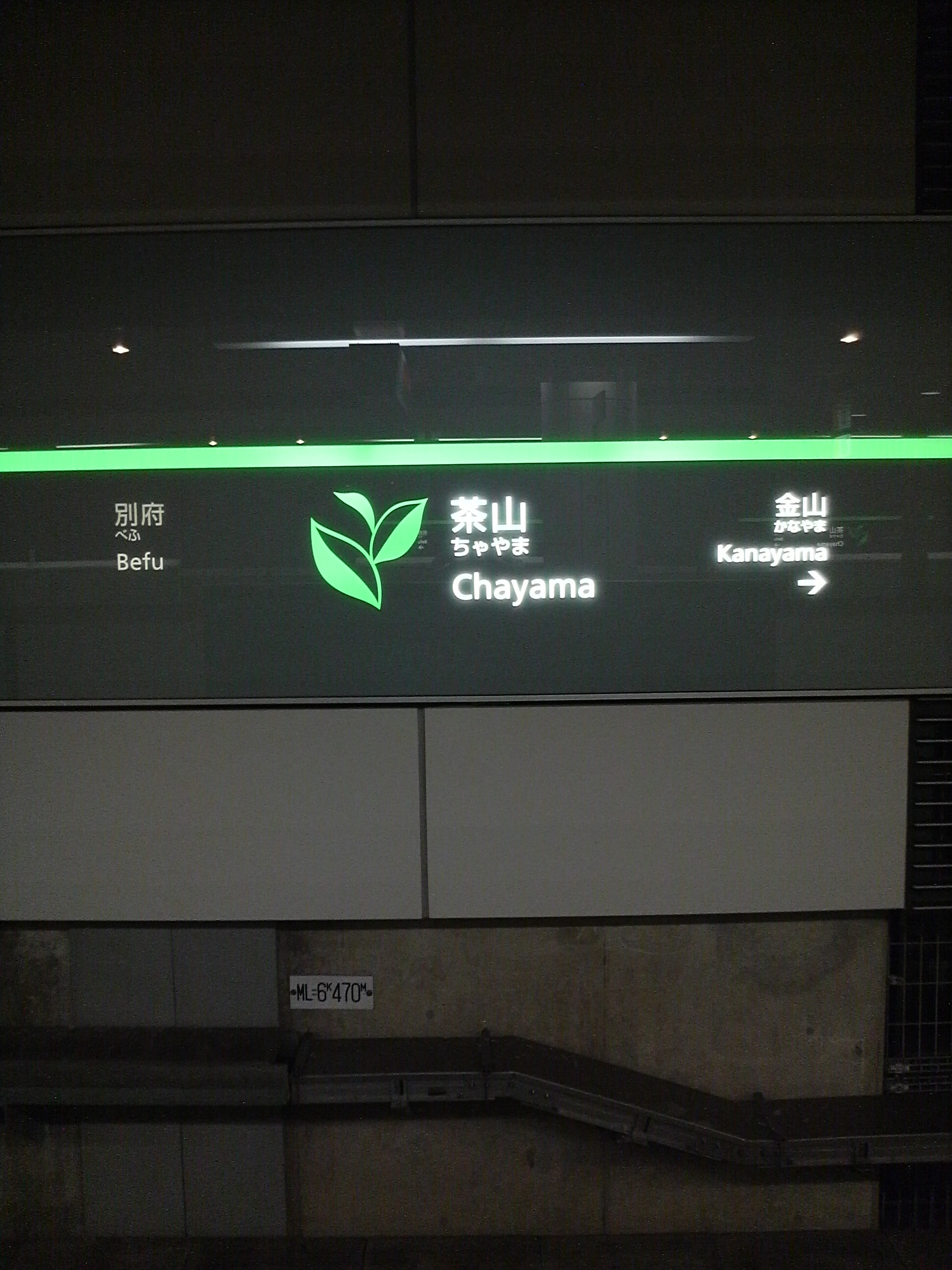
Station symbol

Chayama Station (茶山駅, Chayama-eki) is a subway station on the Fukuoka City Subway Nanakuma Line in Jōnan-ku, Fukuoka in Japan. Its station symbol is a picture of a tea shoot in green.

== Lines ==
- Fukuoka City Subway
  - Nanakuma Line

== Platforms ==
1	■ Nanakuma Line	for Hakata
2	■ Nanakuma Line	for Hashimoto

== Vicinity ==
- am/pm
- Jōnan Municipal Gymnasium
- Jōnan High School

== History ==
- February 3, 2005: Opening of the station
