= Kuroda Nagahiro =

Japanese feudal lord (daimyō)

Marquess Kuroda Nagahiro
- 黒田 長溥
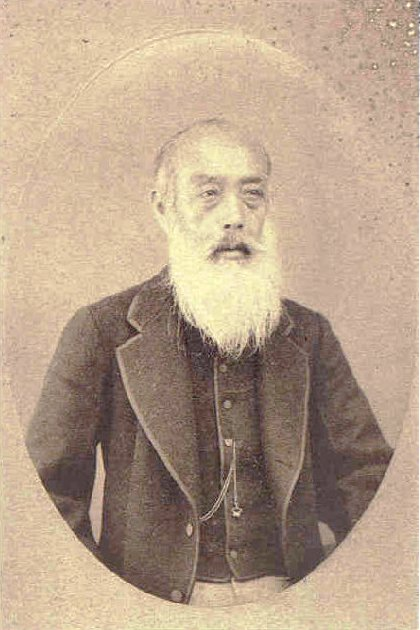
- Marquess Kuroda Nagahiro

Lord of Fukuoka
- In office 1834–1869
- Preceded by: Kuroda Narikiyo
- Succeeded by: Kuroda Nagatomo

Personal details
- Born: March 1, 1811 Edo, Japan
- Died: March 7, 1887 (aged 76)
- Spouse: Kuroda Sumi

Marquess Kuroda Nagahiro (黒田 長溥; March 1, 1811 – March 7, 1887) was a Japanese daimyō of the late Edo period, who ruled the Fukuoka Domain.

== Biography ==
Nagahiro was the ninth son of Shimazu Shigehide, lord of Satsuma Domain; Kuroda Narikiyo, lord of Fukuoka, adopted Nagahiro in 1822 later Nagahiro married Narikiyo's daughter, Sumihime. Nagahiro's mother was a woman of humble origins named Chisa; she had attracted Shigehide's attention with her "sturdy build and great love of sake." Much like his mother, Nagahiro was also well-built. He was close in age to Shimazu Nariakira, and the two had a brotherly relationship. His childhood name was Momojiro (桃次郎).

Nagahiro succeeded his adoptive father in 1834. Much like his birth father, Nagahiro was a serious proponent of technological modernization, especially with regards to his domain's military. After Commodore Perry's arrival, Nagahiro (like his close relative, Shimazu Nariakira) was a proponent of opening the country. He greatly encouraged learning amongst his retainers, and sent them to the best schools of Edo, Osaka, and Nagasaki to absorb the Western knowledge and technical expertise which was entering the country at the time. He himself also engaged in similar efforts, listening to the anatomy lectures of Philipp Franz von Siebold in 1859.

In the Boshin War, his forces took part in the campaign against the domains of the Tōhoku region.

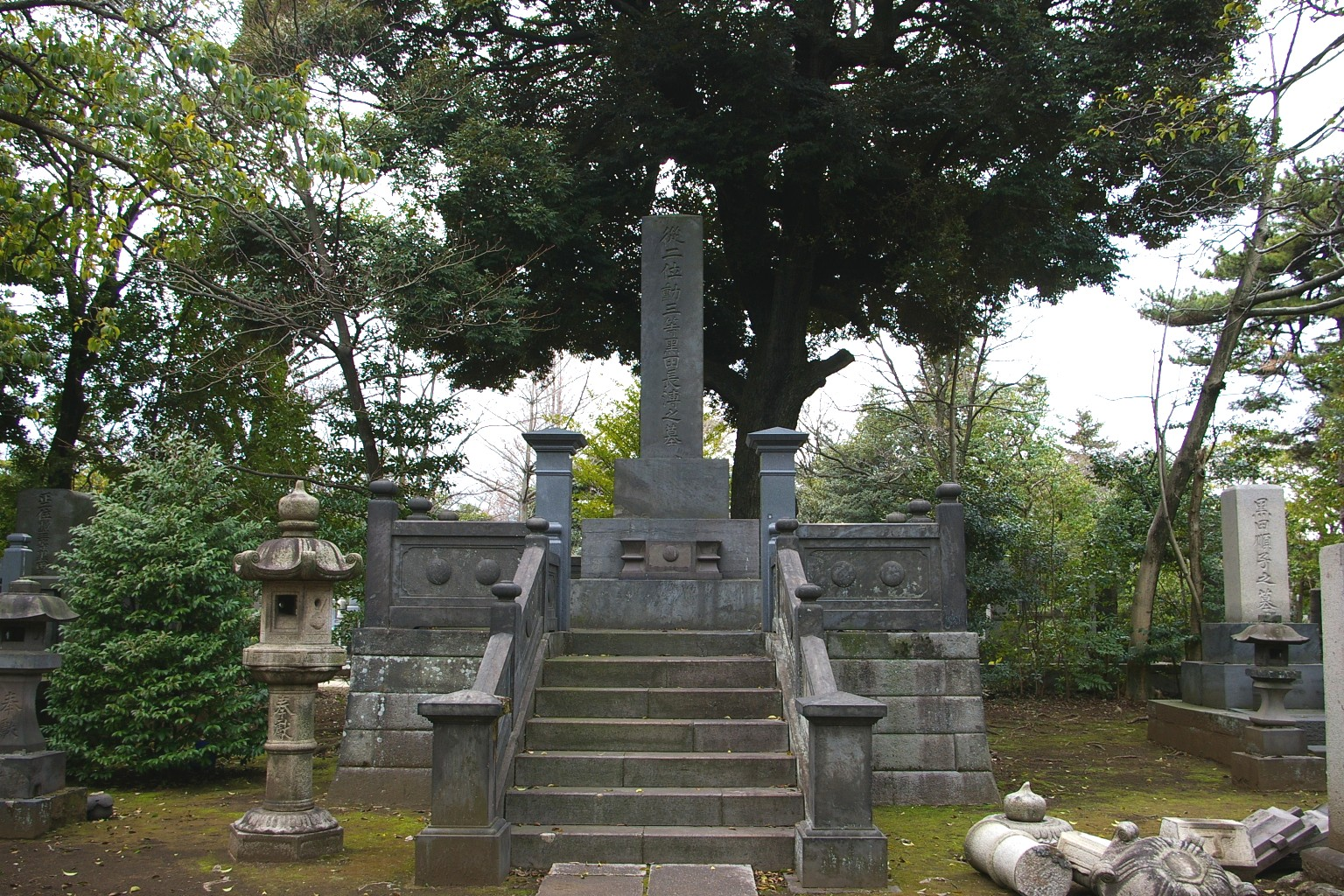
従二位勲三等黒田長溥之墓

Nagahiro held the title of Mino no Kami (美濃守) as well as junior 2nd court rank (juni'i 従二位). In the Meiji era, he was created kōshaku (侯爵; marquess) in the new peerage system.

== Family ==
- Father: Shimazu Shigehide (1745-1833)
- Mother: Makino Chisa
- Foster Father: Kuroda Narikiyo (1795-1851)
- Wife: Sumihime
- Daughter: Ikuhime, Miyoko (who married the Spanish diplomat José Luis Ceacero Inguanzo)
- Adopted Children:
  - Kuroda Nagatomo
  - Keihime married Shijou Takauta (Okudaira Masataka's daughter)
  - Yoshihime married Matsudaira Yoshitomo (Okudaira Masanobu's daughter)

== Notes ==
Preceded by Kuroda Narikiyo	Daimyō of Fukuoka; 1834–1869	Succeeded by Kuroda Nagatomo
