= Yūsentei Park =

Park in Fukuoka, Japan

- 友泉亭公園
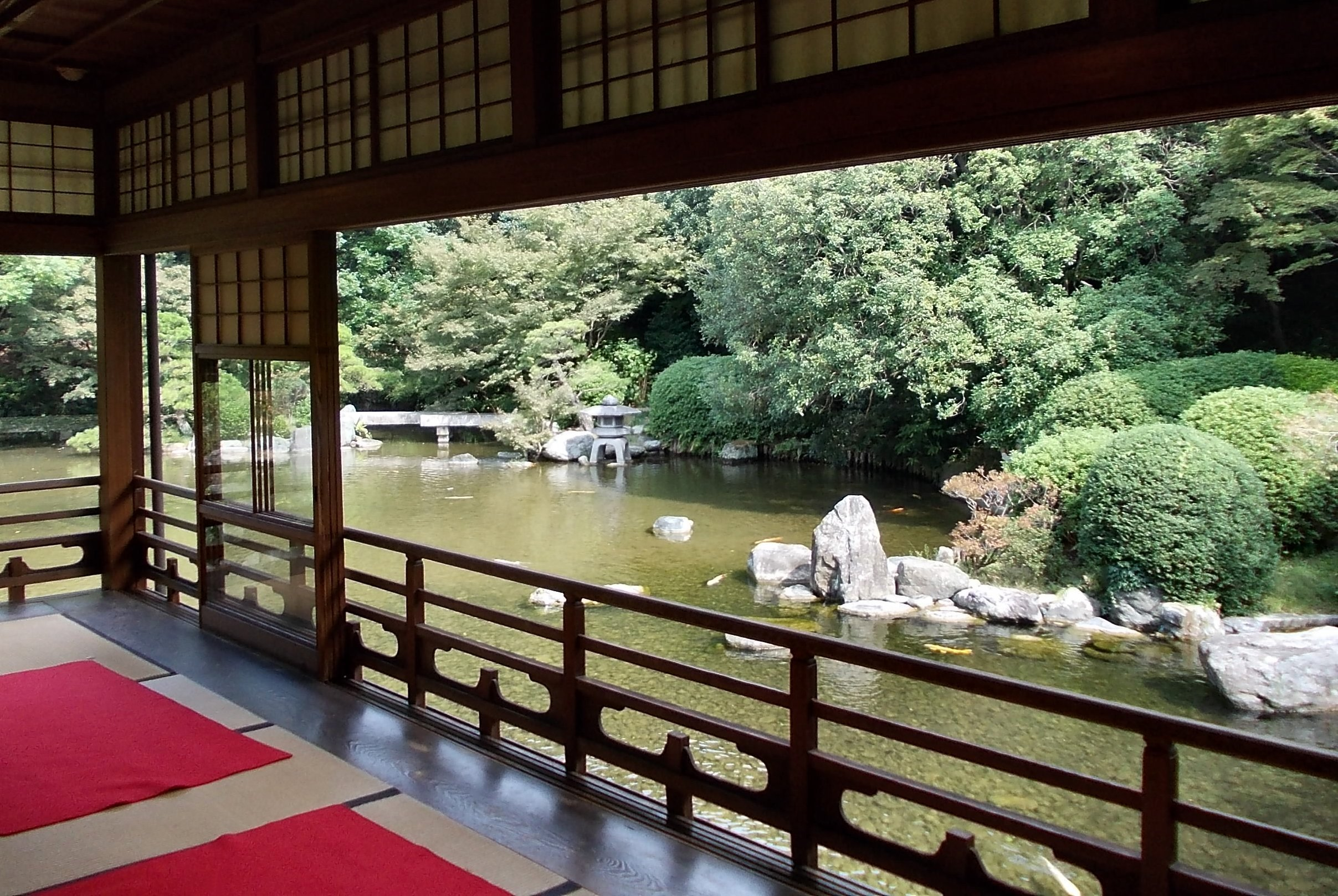
- View of the gardens
- Interactive map of Yūsentei Park
- Type: Japanese Garden
- Location: Fukuoka City, Fukuoka Prefecture
- Area: 1 ha (2.5 acres)
- Opened: April 26, 1981
- Founder: Kuroda Tsugutaka

Yūsentei Park (友泉亭公園, Yūsentei-kōen) is a park in Jōnan-ku, Fukuoka, Japan. It was originally built in the mid-Edo period (1754) for Kuroda Tsugutaka, the 6th domain head of the Kuroda clan. It was named Yūsentei after a later lord's tanka poetry.

The park has a garden and a pond, and is open to the public.
