= Fukuoka Domain =

Domain of Japan (1600–1871)

Fukuoka Domain 福岡藩
- Domain of Japan
- 1600–1871
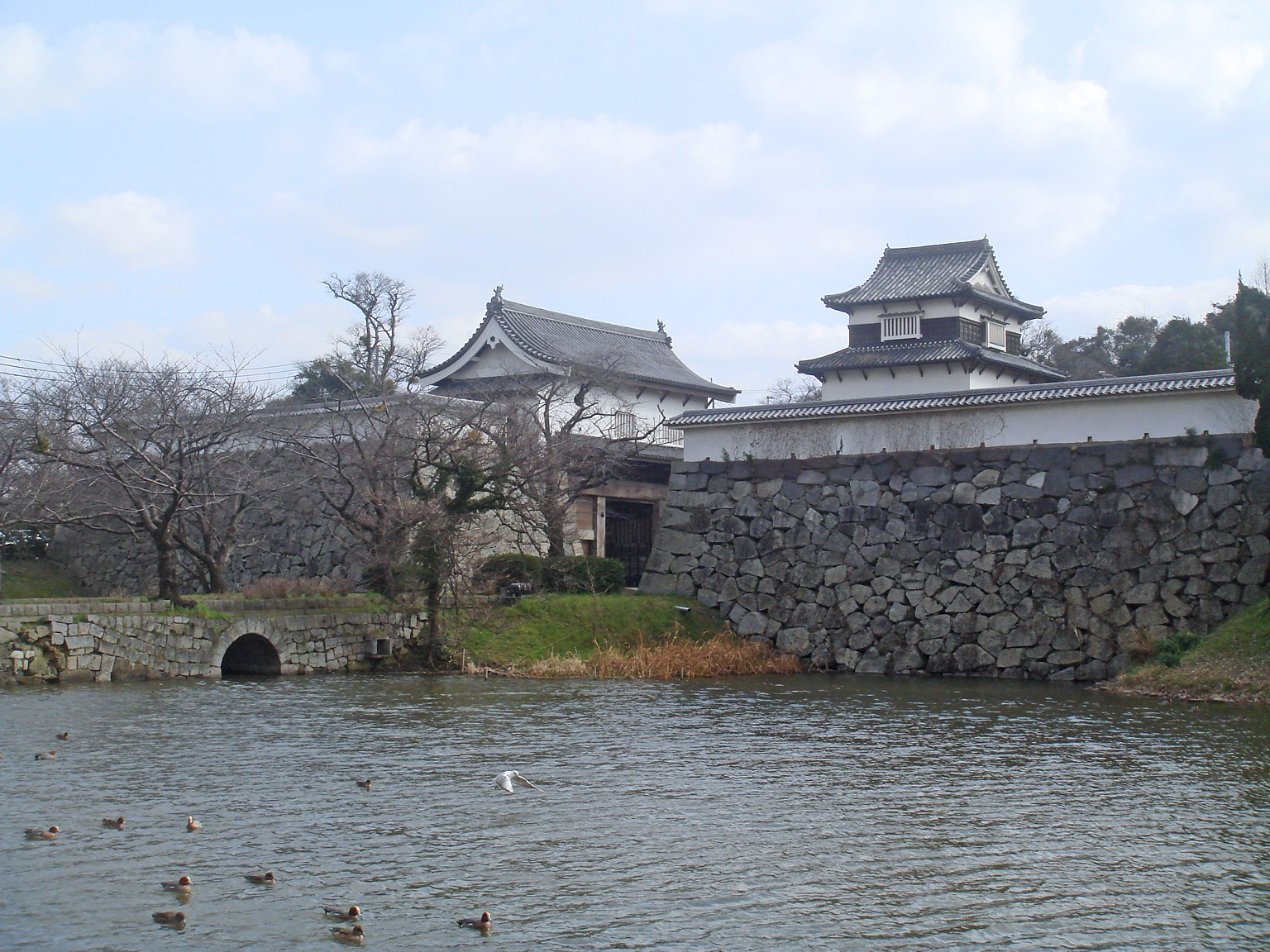
- Walls of Fukuoka Castle

- Mon of the Kuroda clan

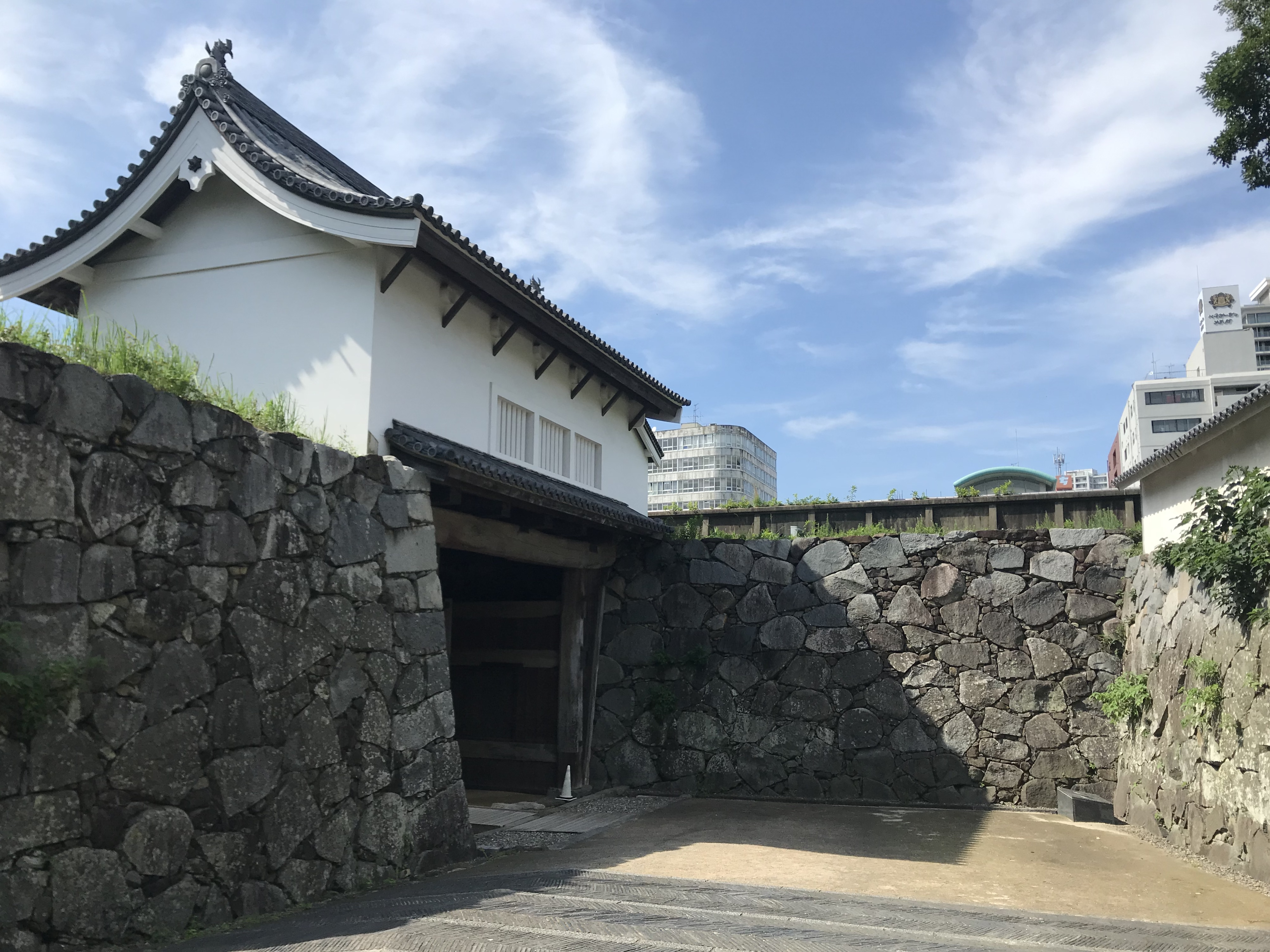
- Shimonohashi Gomon of Fukuoka Castle
- Capital: Fukuoka Castle
- Government
  - Type: Daimyō
- Daimyō
  - 1600-1623: Kuroda Nagamasa (first)
  - 1869-1871: Kuroda Nagatomo (last)
- Historical era: Edo period Meiji period
  - Established: 1600
  - Disestablished: 1871
- Today part of: Fukuoka Prefecture

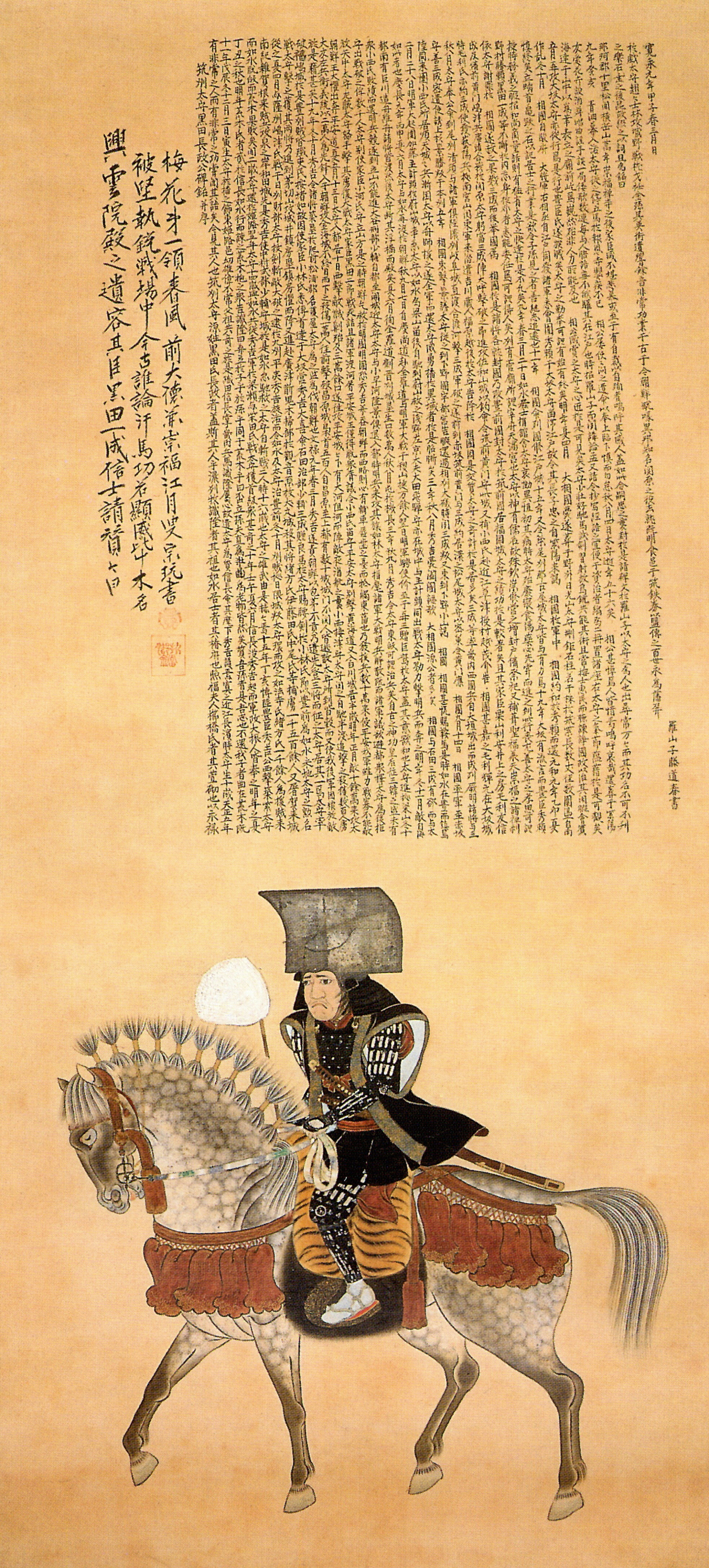
Kuroda Nagamasa, the 1st daimyo of Fukuoka Domain

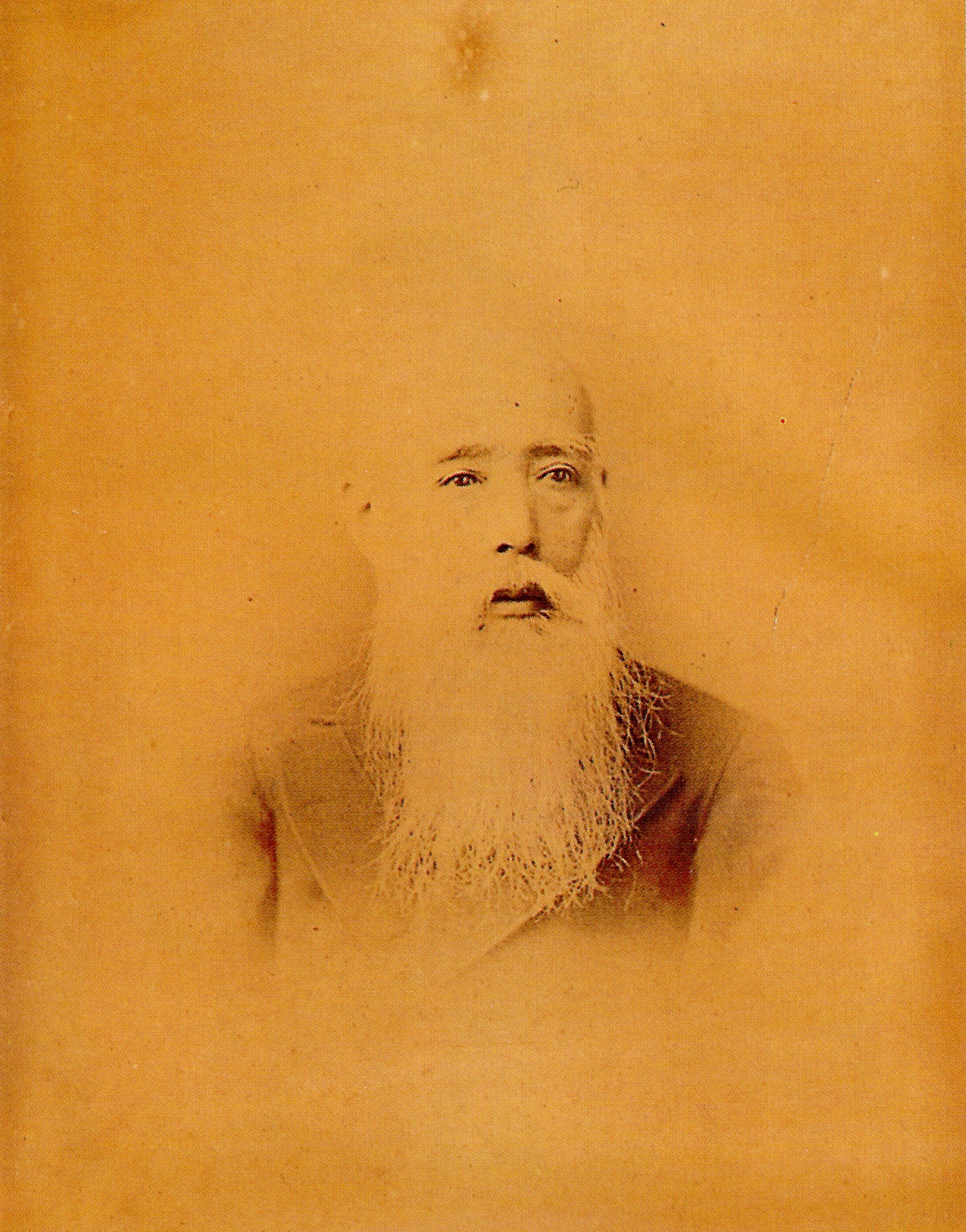
Kuroda Nagahiro, the 11th next to last daimyo of Fukuoka Domain

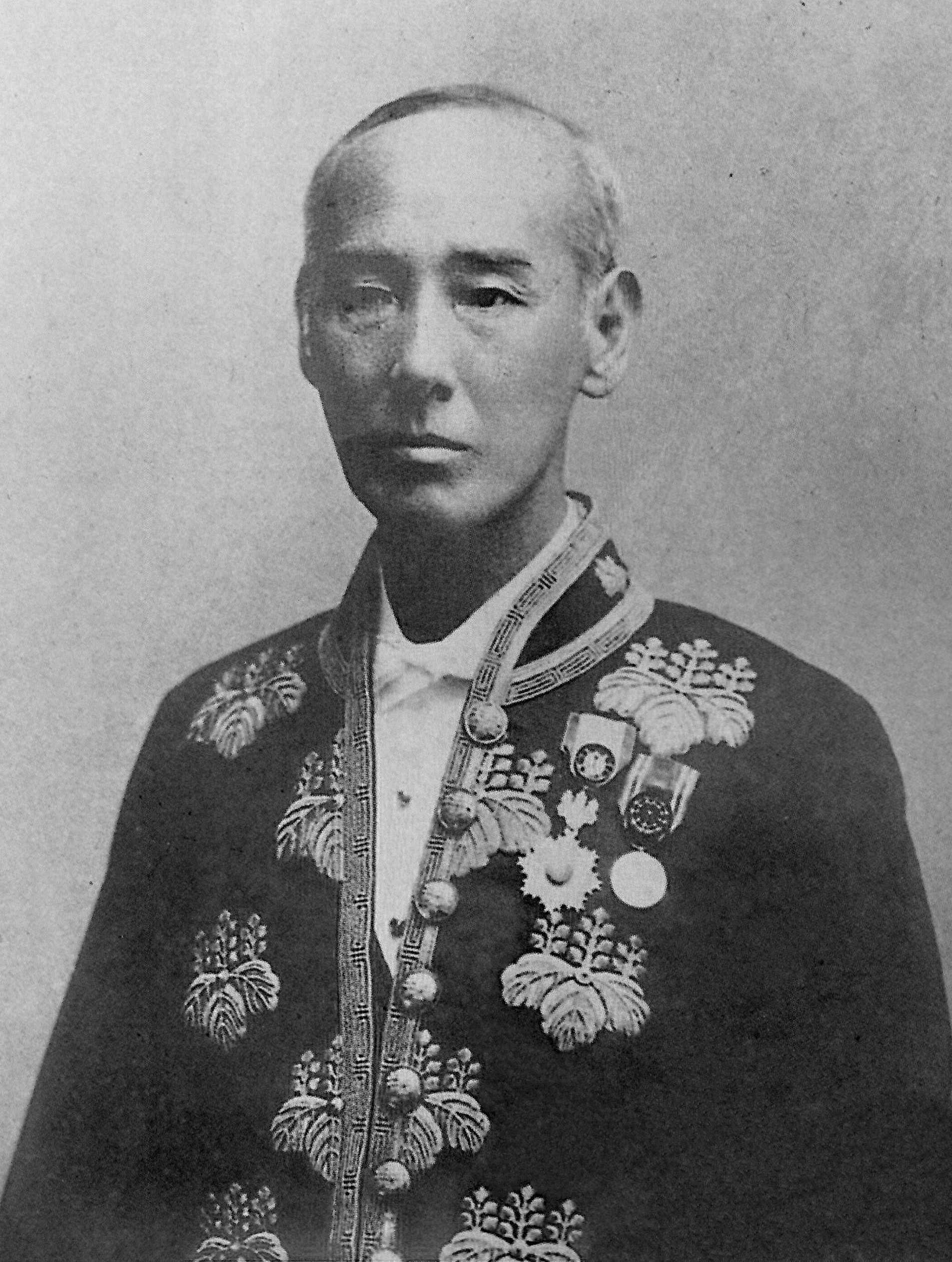
Kuroda Nagatomo, final daimyo of Fukuoka Domain

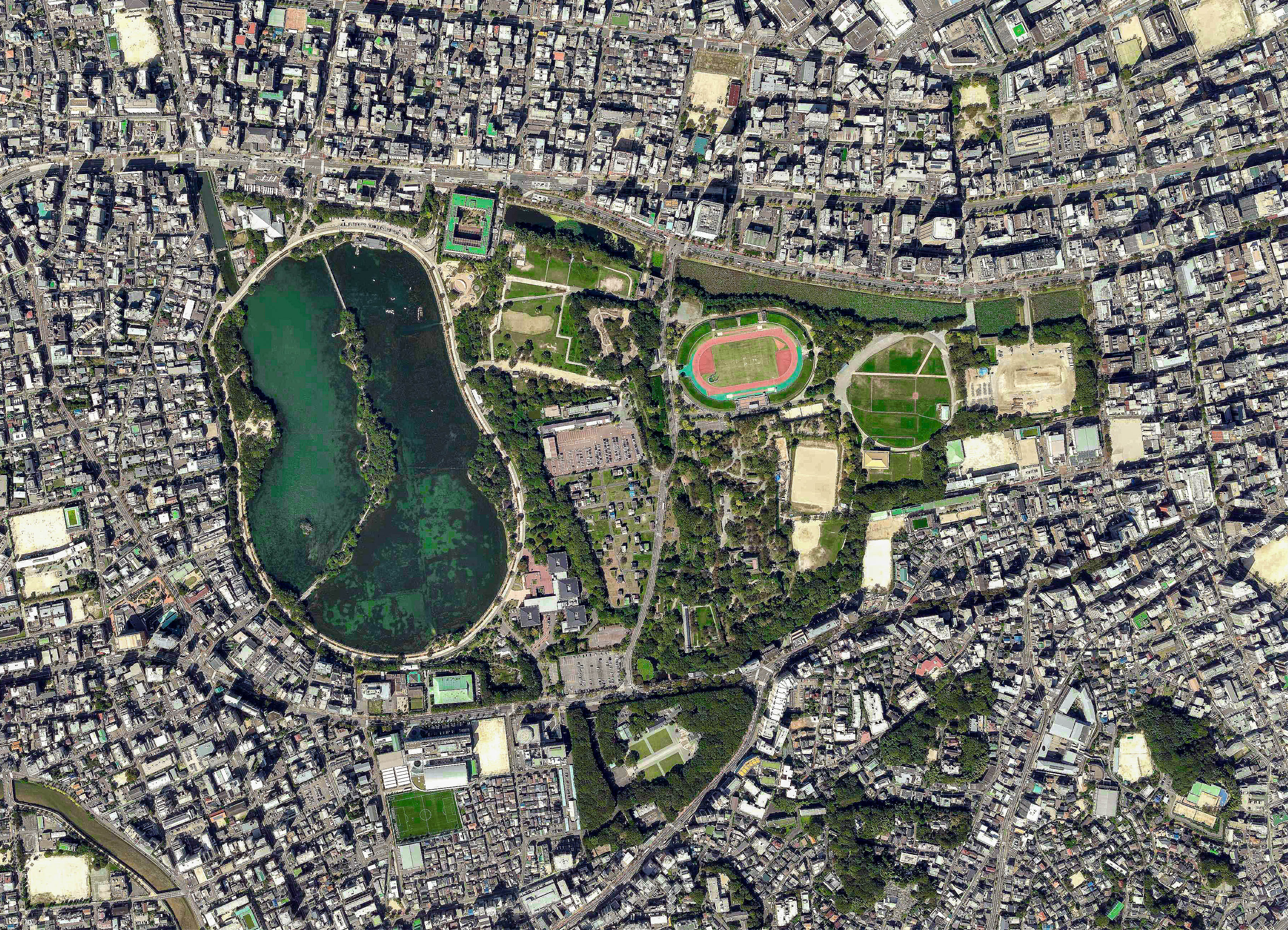
Aerial view of Fukuoka castle

Fukuoka Domain (福岡藩, Fukuoka han) was a Japanese domain of the Edo period. It was associated with Chikuzen Province in modern-day Fukuoka Prefecture on the island of Kyushu. The domain was sometimes referred to as "Chikuzen Domain" or "Kuroda Domain", named after the ruling Kuroda clan. With a kokudaka rating of 473,000 koku, the Fukuoka Domain was the fifth-largest domain in Japan, excluding those held by the Tokugawa-Matsudaira clans.

== History ==
In 1600, Kobayakawa Hideaki, who had previously controlled a portion of Chikuzen, was relocated to the Okayama Domain in Bizen Province as a reward for his successes in the Battle of Sekigahara, and Kuroda Nagamasa, the ruler of the Nakatsu Domain in Buzen Province, was likewise granted a substantial increase to over 523,000 koku in Chikuzen Province. The Matsudaira surname, along with one of the characters from the Shogun's actual name, were bestowed upon subsequent feudal lords from the 2nd daimyō Kuroda Tadayuki onwards. The designated seating area within the Great Hall of Edo Castle was "Matsu no-ma," and from the 9th generation, the upper room in the Great Corridor. The Kuroda clan ruled the domain continuously until the end of the Edo period. In 1641, the Tokugawa shogunate made changes to the sankin kōtai system, reducing the required period of stay in Edo from alternative years to approximately three months every two years to alleviate the financial burden placed on the domain, in exchange for rotating with Saga Domain to provide security for the tenryō territory of Nagasaki. This role continued until the end of the Edo period.

Initially, when entering Chikuzen Prefecture, The Kuroda made Najima Castle, which was constructed by Sengoku warlord Tachibana Kanzai, as their stronghold. However, due to its small size and inconvenient location for transportation, it was decided to relocate the residence in 1601. It took approximately six years to build a new and expansive castle known as Fukuoka Castle. Additionally, in order to guard against the Hosokawa clan, with whom they had strained relations, the Kuroda constructed several castles within the territory, including the "Chikuzen Roppan Castles" (Masumasu Castle, Takatori Castle, Sora Castle, Kurosaki Castle, Wakamatsu Castle, and Koishiwara Castle). These castles were entrusted to loyal vassals. It is worth noting that, following the teachings of his father, Kuroda Jōsui, who emphasized simplicity and frugality, Nagamasa did not build extravagant villas or feudal lord gardens within the domain. His successors generally followed this practice, with the only exception being Kuroda Tsugutaka, the 6th daimyō, who built a retirement residence and a garden called Yūsentei.

The 2nd daimyō, Kuroda Tadayuki, distributed 50,000 koku to his younger brother Nagaoki (creating Akizuki Domain) and 40,000 koku to his younger brother Takamasa (creating Nogata Domain) in accordance to his father Nagamasa's will. This reduced the official kokudaka of the domain to 433,000 koku. During Tadayuki's tenure, there was a feud called the "Kuroda Disturbance", over reforms. The 3rd daimyō, Kuroda Mitsuyuki compiled a history of the Kuroda clan. He also alienated the previously conservative senior vassals by appointing newcomers as senior retainers to implement reforms. This led to the "Second Kuroda Disturbance" under the 4th daimyō, Kuroda Tsunamasa. The 5th daimyō, Kuroda Nobumasa was of poor health and was unable to travel from Edo to his domain, so his uncle Kuroda Nagakiyo assisted in local administration. As he died without heir, the 6th daimyō, Kuroda Tsugutaka was adopted from the sub-domain of Nogata, which was absorbed back into the main domain, bringing its kokudaka up to 473,000 koku. He was also the last ruler in the direct line of succession, as the 7th daimyō, Kuroda Haruyuki was an adopted son-in-law of the Hitotsubashi-Tokugawa clan, and a grandson of the 8th Shogun Tokugawa Yoshimune. The 8th daimyō, Kuroda Harutaka was adopted from the Kyōgoku clan of Tadotsu Domain. The 9th daimyō, Kuroda Naritaka was adopted from the Hitotsubashi-Tokugawa and was the younger brother of Shogun Tokugawa Ienari. In 1784, he established two domain schools: Shuyukan and Kantokan. Of these, Shuyukan, survives in the modern era as the Fukuoka Prefectural Shuyukan High School. His son, the 10th daimyō, Kuroda Narikiyo was noted for rangaku studies and his attempts to modernize the domain. The 11th daimyō, Kuroda Nagahisa was adopted from the Shimazu clan and was also a noted rangaku scholar. The 12th and final daimyō, Kuroda Nagatomo was adopted from the Tōdō clan of Tsu Domain. He was a noted supporter of the Noh theatre.

During the Bakumatsu period, the domain was prominently pro-Sonnō jōi was strongly opposed the First Chōshū expedition of 1865. Simultaneously, the domain convinced Sanjō Sanetomi and five other kuge aristocrats supporting Chōshū to relocated to Dazaifu. This earned the ire of the shogunate and rumors circulated that the shogunate was considering arresting Kuroda Nagahisa on suspicion of rebellion. The shogunate's decision to proceed with the Second Chōshū expedition resulted in a wavering of support back towards the shogunate and the arrest of numerous members of the Sonnō jōi faction, with seven individuals, including the karō of the domain, committing seppuku, fourteen individuals beheaded, and fifteen individuals exiled. The faction was decimated. However, with the Meiji Restoration in 1868, the loyalists made a resurgence and regained control over domain affairs. In 1870, Matsukata Masayoshi made allegations against the Fukuoka feudal retainers for counterfeiting Daijō-kan banknotes. A subsequent investigation conducted by the Meiji government confirmed the accusations and revealed the involvement of the Fukuoka clan leadership as well. As a result, on July 2, 1871, Kuroda Nagatomo was dismissed from his position as imperial governor and was replaced by Imperial Prince Arisugawa Taruhito, who had connections with the Kuroda family. This transition took place within a span of only 12 days. As a consequence of the incident, five high-ranking former domain officials were executed as perpetrators, while ten more individuals were either imprisoned or exiled. The Kuroda clan subsequently left Fukuoka and relocated to Tokyo. In 1884, Nagatomo's son, Kuroda Nagashige Kuroda, was conferred the title of marquis in the kazoku peerage. His son was married to Shigeko, the daughter of Prince Kan'in Kotohito.

== Holdings at the end of the Edo period ==
As with most domains in the han system, Fukuoka Domain consisted of several discontinuous territories calculated to provide the assigned kokudaka, based on periodic cadastral surveys and projected agricultural yields.

Fukuoka Domain

- Chikuzen Province
  - Kasuya District – 85 villages
  - Munakata District – 60 villages
  - Onga District – 85 villages
  - Kurate District – 68 villages
  - Kamiza District – 34 villages
  - Mikasa District – 57 villages
  - Naka District – 70 villages
  - Shikida District – 9 villages
  - Sawara District – 53 villages
  - Shima District – 48 villages
  - Honami District – 59 villages
  - Kama District – 43 villages
  - Shimoza District – 33 villages
  - Yasu District – 16 villages
  - Yito District – 24 villages

Akizuki Domain

  - Kama District – 20 villages (incorporated into Fukuoka Domain)
  - Shimoza District – 11 villages
  - Yasu District – 38 villages

== List of daimyōs ==
#	Name	Tenure	Courtesy title	Court Rank	kokudaka
Kuroda clan, 1600–1871 (Tozama daimyo)
1	Kuroda Nagamasa (黒田長政)	1600–1623	Chikuzen-no-kami (筑前守)	Junior 4th Rank, Lower Grade (従四位下)	502,000 koku
2	Kuroda Tadayuki (黒田忠之)	1623–1654	Chikuzen-no-kami (筑前守); Emon-no-suke (右衛門佐)	Junior 4th Rank, Lower Grade (従四位下)	502,000 koku
3	Kuroda Mitsuyuki (黒田光之)	1654–1688	Ukyō-no-daibu (右京大夫)	Junior 4th Rank, Lower Grade (従四位下)	502,000 --> 412,000 koku
4	Kuroda Tsunamasa (黒田綱政)	1688–1711	Hizen-no-kami (肥前守), Emon-no-suke (右衛門佐)	Junior 4th Rank, Lower Grade (従四位下)	412,000 koku
5	Kuroda Nobumasa (黒田宣政)	1711–1719	Hizen-no-kami (肥前守)	Junior 4th Rank, Lower Grade (従四位下)	412,000 koku
6	Kuroda Tsugutaka (黒田継高)	1719–1769	Chikuzen-no-kami (筑前守); Zusho-no-kami (図書頭)	Junior 4th Rank, Lower Grade (従四位下)	412,000 —-> 433,000 koku
7	Kuroda Haruyuki (黒田継高)	1769–1781	Shikibu Daisuke (式部大輔); Chikuzen-no-kami (筑前守)	Junior 4th Rank, Lower Grade (従四位下)	433,000 koku
8	Kuroda Harutaka (黒田継高)	1781–1782	Chikuzen-no-kami (筑前守)	Junior 4th Rank, Lower Grade (従四位下)	433,000 koku
9	Kuroda Naritaka (黒田斉隆)	1782–1795	Jijū, Chikuzen-no-kami (侍従兼筑前守)	Junior 4th Rank, Lower Grade (従四位下)	433,000 —-> 473,000 koku
10	Kuroda Narikiyo (黒田斉清)	1795–1834	Sakon'e-no-shōshō (左近衛権少将), Bizen-no-kami (備前守)	Junior 4th Rank, Lower Grade (従四位下)	473,000 koku
11	Kuroda Nagahiro (黒田斉溥)	1834–1869	Sakon'e-no-chushō (左近衛権中将),	Senior 4th Rank, Lower Grade (従四位下)	473,000 koku
12	Kuroda Nagatomo (黒田慶賛)	1869–1871	Sakon'e-no-shōshō (左近衛権少将),	Junior 4th Rank, Lower Grade (従四位下)	473,000 koku
13	Prince Arisugawa Taruhito (有栖川宮熾仁親)	1871	None	Shinnō (親王)	473,000 koku

=== Family tree ===
- I. Kuroda Nagamasa, 1st daimyō of Fukuoka (cr. 1600) (1568–1623; Lord of Fukuoka: 1600–1623)
  - II. Tadayuki, 2nd daimyō of Fukuoka (1602–1654; r. 1623–1654)
    - III. Mitsuyuki, 3rd daimyō of Fukuoka (1628–1707; r. 1654–1688)
      - IV. Tsunamasa, 4th daimyō of Fukuoka (1659-1711; r. 1688–1711)
        - V. Nobumasa, 5th daimyō of Fukuoka (1685–1744; r. 1711–1719)
      - Nagakiyo, daimyō of Nogata (1667–1720)
        - VI. Tsugutaka, 6th daimyō of Fukuoka (1703–1775; r. 1719–1769)

As Tsugutaka, the sixth daimyō, was without heirs, he adopted an heir from a branch of the Tokugawa family to continue the line:

- Tokugawa Munetada, 1st Hitotsubashi-Tokugawa family head (1721–1765)
  - Tokugawa Harusada, 2nd Hitotsubashi-Tokugawa family head (1751–1827)
    - IX. Naritaka, 9th daimyō of Fukuoka (1777–1795; r. 1782–1795)
      - X. Narikiyo, 10th daimyō of Fukuoka (1795–1851; r. 1795–1834). He had a daughter:
        - Junhime (d. 1851), m. XI. (Shimazu) Nagahiro, 11th daimyō of Fukuoka, 11th family head (1811–1887; r. 1834–1869; family head: 1834–1869). He had a daughter:
          - Rikuhime, m. XII. (Tōdō) Nagatomo, 12th daimyō of Fukuoka, 12th family head (1839–1902; Lord: 1869; Governor: 1869–1871; family head: 1869–1878)
            - Nagashige, 13th family head, 1st Marquess (1867–1939; family head: 1878–1939; Marquess: 1884)
              - Nagamichi, 14th family head, 2nd Marquess (1889–1978; family head: 1939–1978; 2nd Marquess: 1939–1947)
                - Nagahisa, 15th family head (1916–2009; family head: 1978–2009)
                  - Nagataka, 16th family head (b. 1952; family head: 2009–present)
  - VII.(Kuroda) Haruyuki, 7th daimyō of Fukuoka (1753–1781; r. 1769–1781). Adopted by the sixth Lord of Fukuoka. He adopted an heir, the eighth daimyō:
  - VIII. (Kyōgoku) Harutaka, 8th daimyō of Fukuoka (1754–1782; r. 1782)

== See also ==
- List of Han
- Abolition of the han system
