= Fukuoka University =

Private university in Fukuoka Prefecture, Japan

Coordinates: 33°33′01″N 130°21′58″E

- 福岡大学
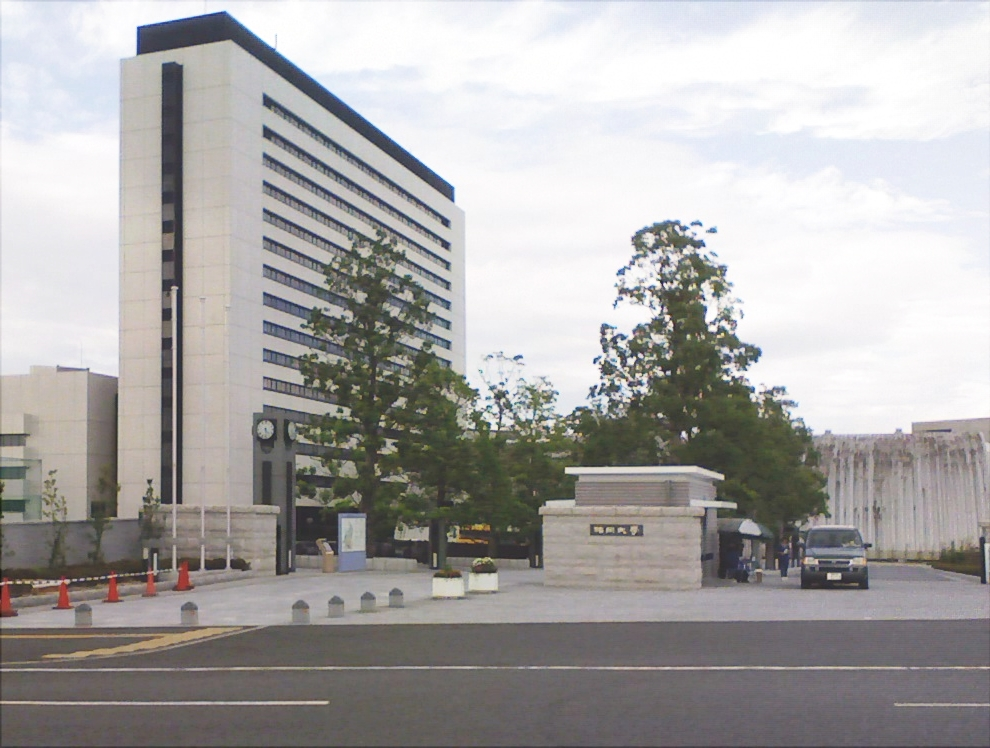
- Type: Private
- Established: 1934
- Founder: Umetaro Mizoguchi
- President: Kiyofumi Nagata
- Administrative staff: 2,111
- Students: 19,611
- Undergraduates: 663
- Doctoral students: 80
- Location: Fukuoka, Japan
- Campus: Urban
- Website: www.fukuoka-u.ac.jp/english/

Fukuoka University is a private research university located in Fukuoka, Japan.

The university has nine faculties with a total of around 20,000 students, 800 of whom are foreign. Its two campuses are in Nanakuma and Kitakyushu. Fukuoka University Hospital is one of Japan's top hospitals.

The university has various alumni active in medical science, healthcare science, public health, life science and research.

== Organization ==
=== Faculties ===
- Medicine
- Pharmaceutical sciences
- Engineering
- Architecture

=== Graduate schools ===
- Medicine
- Pharmaceutical sciences
- Physical education
- Law
- Science
- Engineering

== Access ==
- Fukudai-Mae bus stop
- Fukudaimae Station (Fukuoka Subway Nanakuma Line)

== Notable alumni ==
- Yoshinori Kobayashi (born 1953), manga artist
- Hiroyuki Morita (born 1964), animator and director
- Yuya Uemura (born 1994), professional wrestler

=== Notable faculty ===
- Kazuo Ueda (born 1943), Yiddishist
