= Daimyo =

Powerful feudal territorial lord in pre-modern Japan

A map of the territories of the Sengoku daimyo around the first year of the Genki era (1570 AD)

Daimyo or daimio (大名, daimyō; English: /ˈdaɪm.joʊ/, DIME-yoh; Japanese: [dai.mʲoꜜː]) were powerful Japanese magnates, feudal lords who, from the 15th century to the early Meiji period in the middle 19th century, ruled most of Japan from their vast hereditary land holdings. They were subordinate to the shogun and nominally to the emperor and the kuge (an aristocratic class). In the term, dai (大) means 'large', and myō stands for myōden (名田), meaning 'private land'.

From the shugo of the Muromachi period through the Sengoku period to the daimyo of the Edo period, the rank had a long and varied history. The backgrounds of daimyo also varied considerably; while some daimyo clans, notably the Mōri, Shimazu and Hosokawa, were cadet branches of the Imperial family or were descended from the kuge, other daimyo were promoted from the ranks of the samurai, notably during the Edo period.

Detailed map of the daimyo between 1564 and 1573

Daimyo often hired samurai to guard their land, and paid them in land or food, as relatively few could afford to pay them in money. The daimyo era ended soon after the Meiji Restoration, with the adoption of the prefecture system in 1871.

== Shugo-daimyō ==
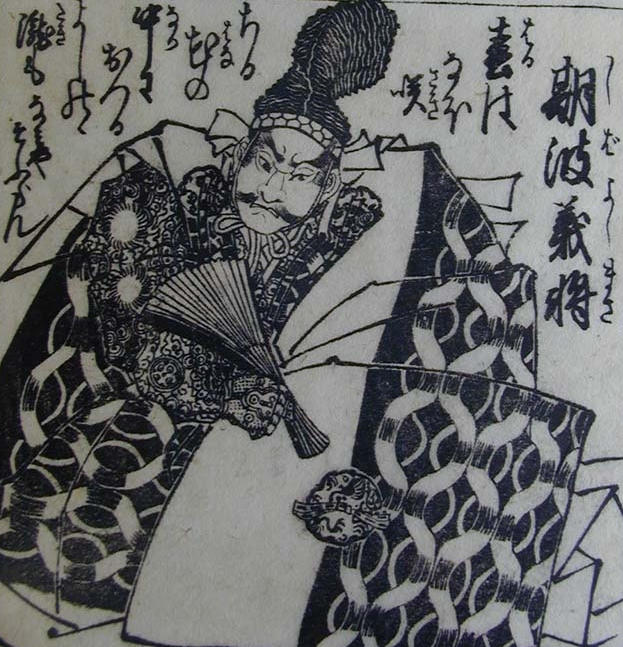
Shiba Yoshimasa of Shiba clan, one of the shugo-daimyō

The shugo daimyō (守護大名) were the first group of men to hold the title daimyō. They arose from among the shugo during the Muromachi period (approximately 1336–1573). The shugo-daimyo held not only military and police powers, but also economic power within a province. They accumulated these powers throughout the first decades of the Muromachi period.

Major shugo-daimyō came from the Shiba, Hatakeyama, and Hosokawa clans, as well as the tozama clans of Yamana, Ōuchi, Takeda and Akamatsu. The greatest ruled multiple provinces.

The Ashikaga shogunate required the shugo-daimyō to reside in Kyoto, so they appointed relatives or retainers, called shugodai, to represent them in their home provinces. Eventually, some of these in turn came to reside in Kyoto, appointing deputies in the provinces.

The Ōnin War was a major uprising in which shugo-daimyō fought each other. During this and other wars of the time, kuni ikki, or provincial uprisings, took place as locally powerful warriors sought independence from the shugo-daimyo. The deputies of the shugo-daimyō, living in the provinces, seized the opportunity to strengthen their position. At the end of the fifteenth century, those shugo-daimyō who succeeded remained in power. Those who had failed to exert control over their deputies fell from power and were replaced by a new class, the sengoku-daimyō, who arose from the ranks of the shugodai and jizamurai.

== Sengoku-daimyo ==
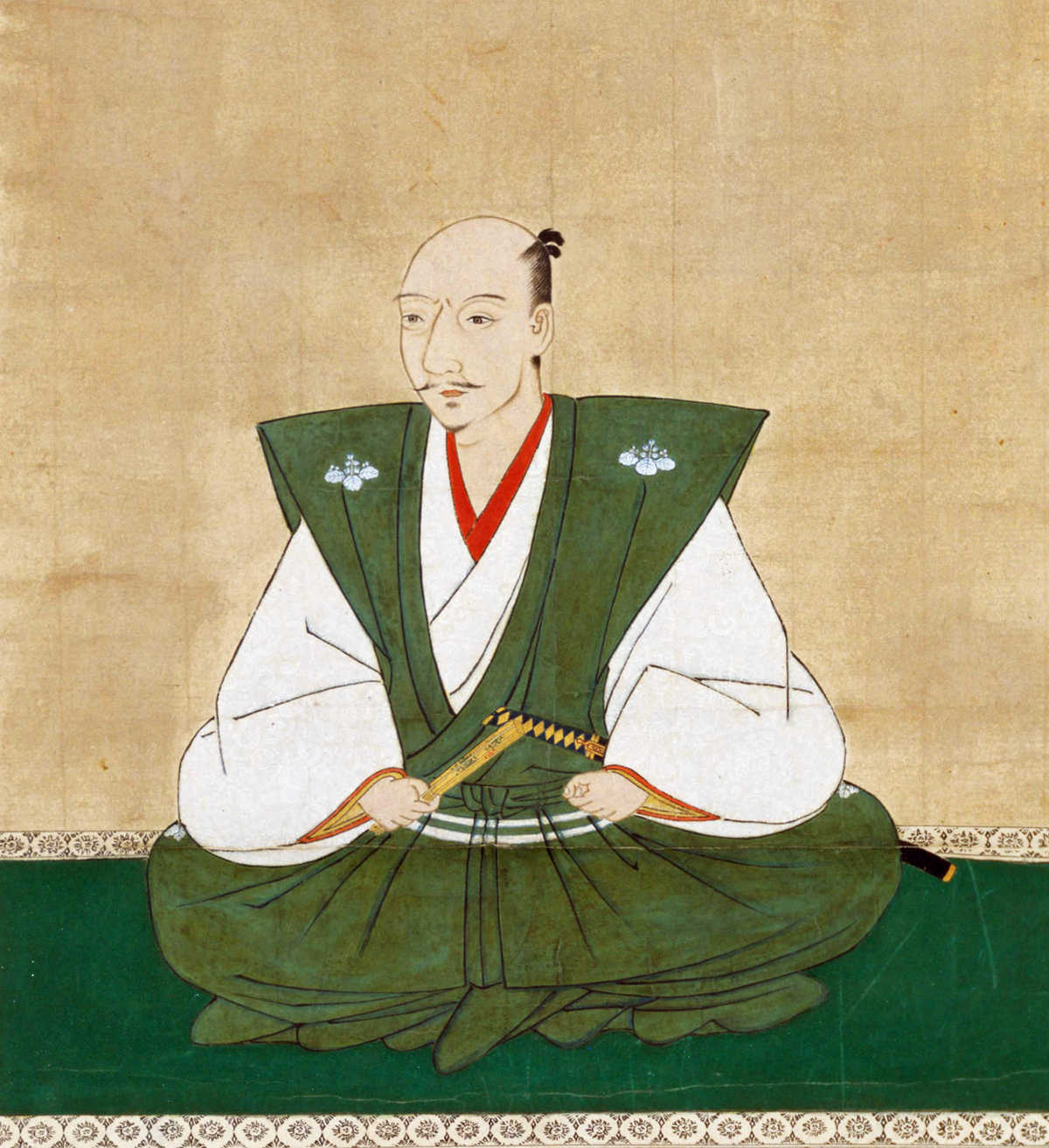
Oda Nobunaga, a powerful daimyo during the Sengoku period

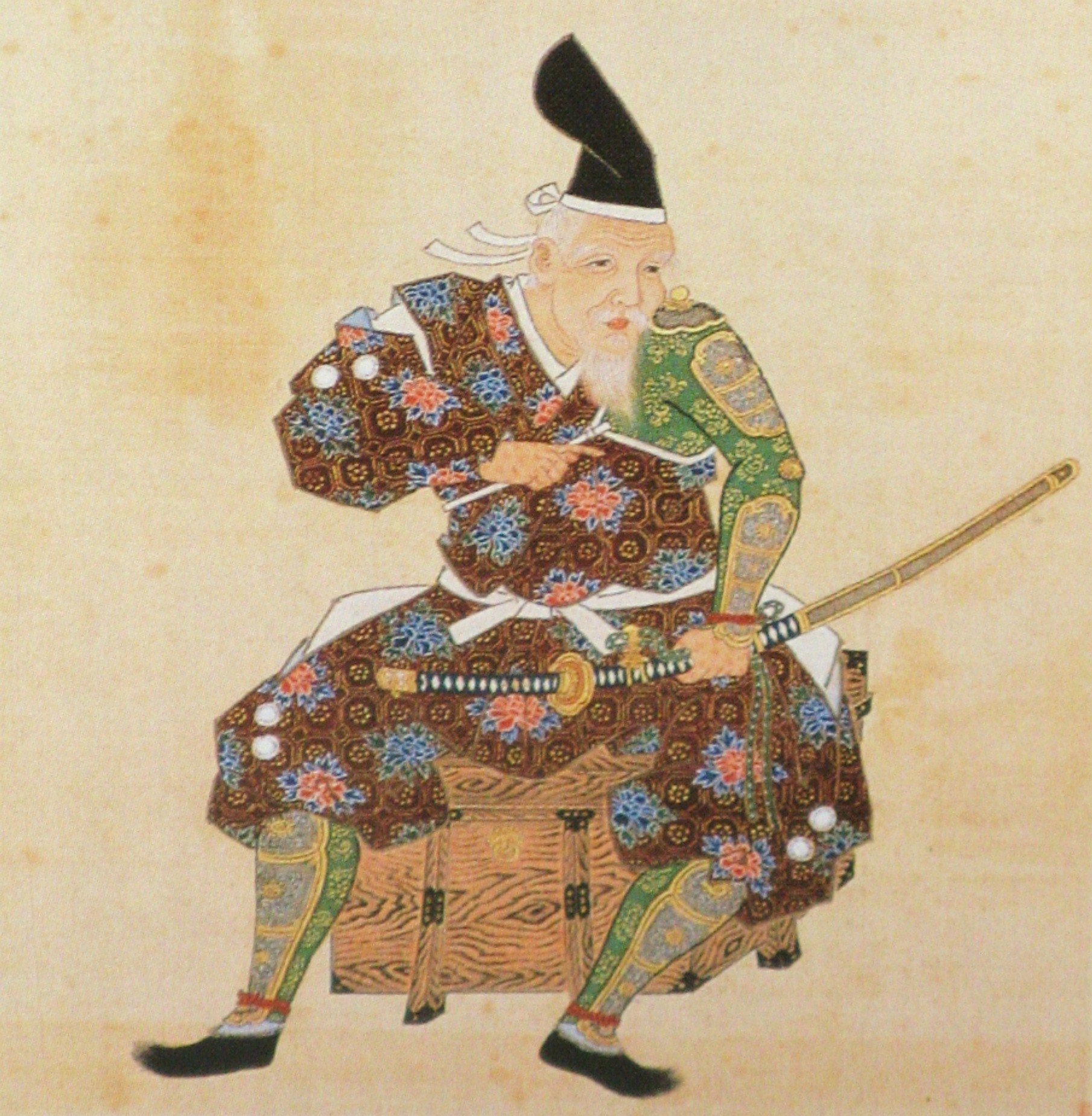
Date Tanemune, a daimyo during the Sengoku period

Whereas the shugo daimyō of the Muromachi period received their legitimacy from the shogunate, the sengoku daimyō of the Sengoku period were de facto independent lords. Their samurai and the peasants of their domains were loyal to them, not the shogun. In other words, they were warlords.

Among the sengoku daimyō (戦国大名) were many who had been shugo-daimyō, such as the Satake, Imagawa, Takeda, Toki, Rokkaku, Ōuchi, and Shimazu. New to the ranks of the daimyo were the Asakura, Amago, Nagao, Miyoshi, Chōsokabe, Hatano, and Oda. These came from the ranks of the shugodai and their deputies.

Additional sengoku-daimyō such as the Mōri, Tamura, and Ryūzōji arose from the jizamurai. The lower officials of the shogunate and rōnin (Late Hōjō, Saitō), provincial officials (Kitabatake), and kuge (Tosa Ichijō) also gave rise to sengoku-daimyo.

== Edo period ==
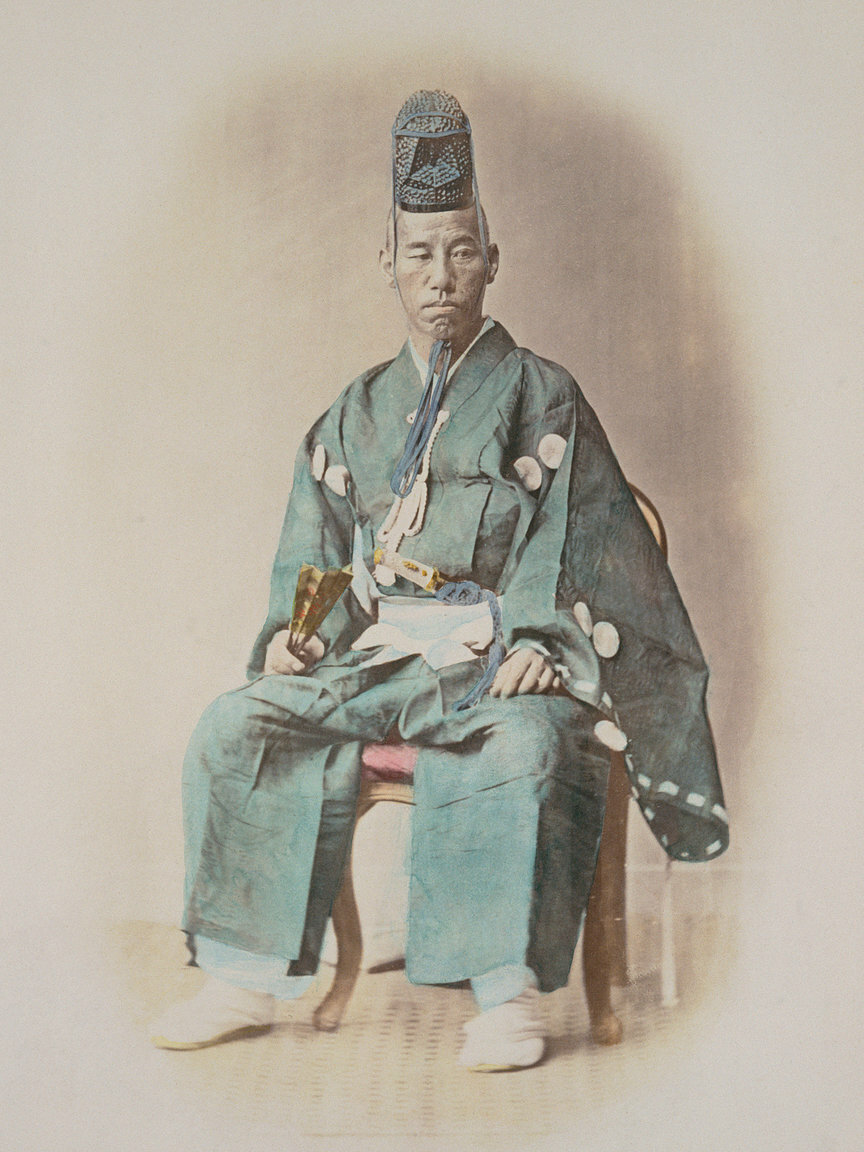
Date Munenari, 8th head of the Uwajima Domain

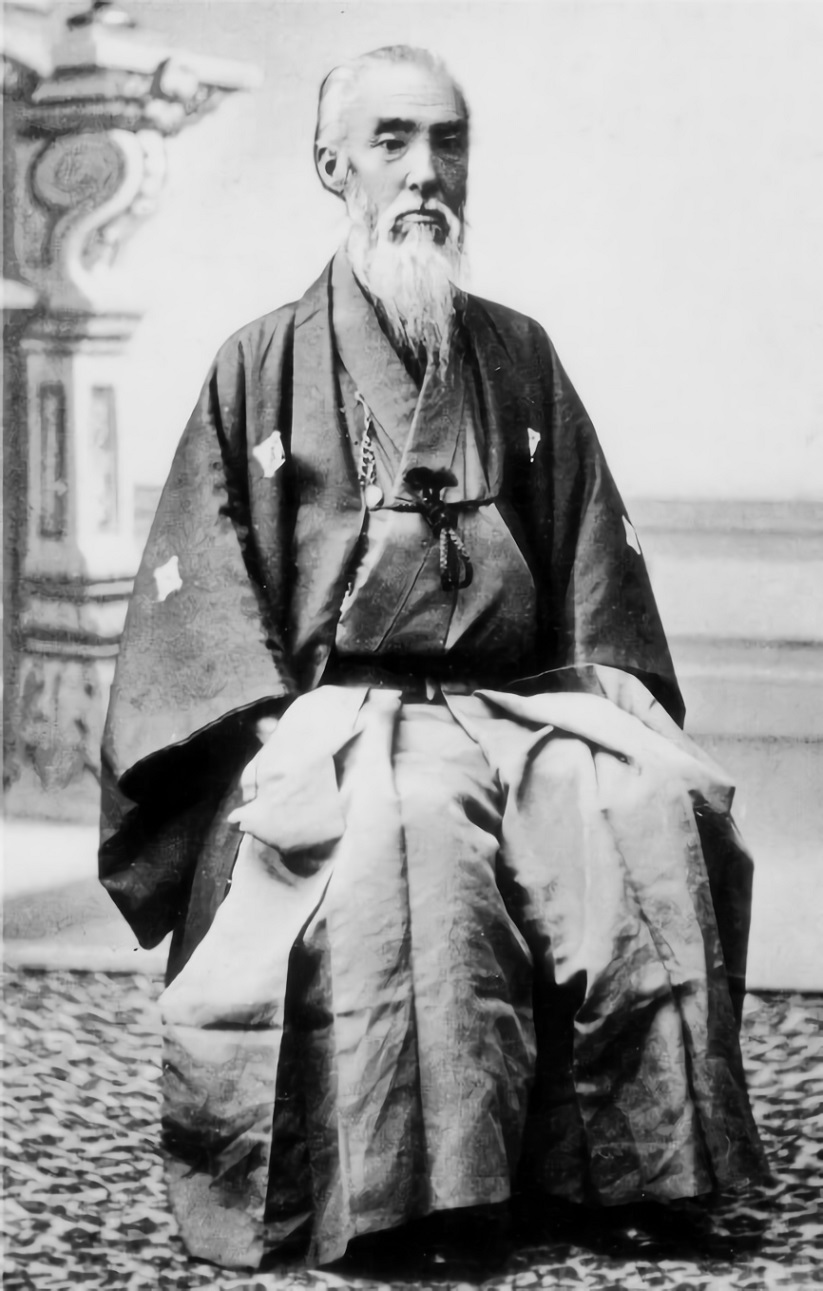
Kamei Koremi, a daimyo during the Bakumatsu period

The Battle of Sekigahara in 1600 marked the beginning of the Edo period. Shōgun Tokugawa Ieyasu reorganized roughly 200 daimyo and their territories into han, which were assessed by rice production. Those heading han assessed at 10,000 koku (50,000 bushels) or more were considered daimyo. Ieyasu also categorized the daimyo according to their relation to the ruling Tokugawa family: the shinpan were related to the Tokugawa; the fudai had been vassals of the Tokugawa or allies in battle; and the tozama had not allied with the Tokugawa before the Battle of Sekigahara (but did not necessarily fight against the Tokugawa).

The shinpan were collaterals of Ieyasu, such as the Matsudaira, or descendants of Ieyasu other than in the main line of succession. Several shinpan, including the Tokugawa of Owari (Nagoya), Kii (Wakayama), and Mito, as well as the Matsudaira of Fukui and Aizu, held large han.

A few fudai daimyō, such as the Ii of Hikone, held large han, but many were small. The shogunate placed many fudai at strategic locations to guard the trade routes and the approaches to Edo. Also, many fudai daimyo took positions in the Edo shogunate, some rising to the position of rōjū. The fact that fudai daimyo could hold government positions, while tozama in general could not, was a main difference between the two.

Tozama daimyō held mostly large fiefs far away from the capital, with e.g. the Kaga han of Ishikawa Prefecture, headed by the Maeda clan, assessed at 1,000,000 koku. Other famous tozama clans included the Mori of Chōshū, the Shimazu of Satsuma, the Date of Sendai, the Uesugi of Yonezawa, and the Hachisuka of Awa. Initially, the Tokugawa regarded them as potentially rebellious, but for most of the Edo period, control policies such as sankin-kōtai, resulted in peaceful relations.

Daimyo were required to maintain residences in Edo as well as their fiefs, and to move periodically between Edo and their fiefs, typically spending alternate years in each place, in a practice called sankin-kōtai.

== After the Meiji Restoration ==
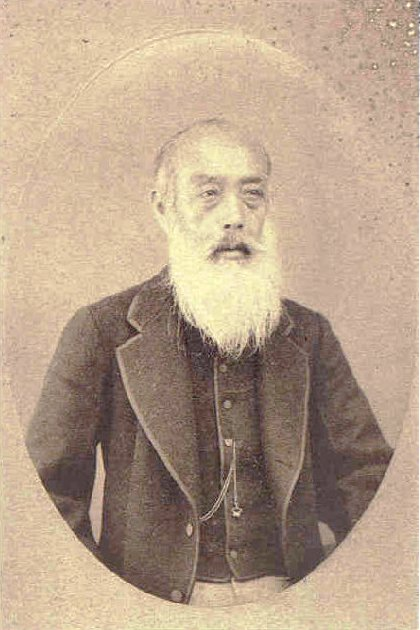
Marquess Kuroda Nagahiro, a daimyo of the Fukuoka Domain

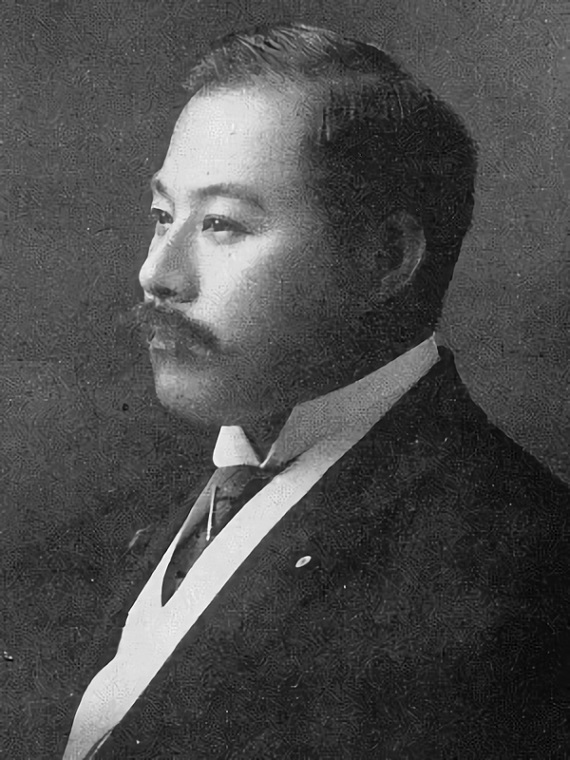
Viscount Maeda Toshisada, eldest son of Maeda Toshiaki, last daimyo of Nanokaichi Domain in Kōzuke Province

In 1869, the year after the Meiji Restoration, the daimyo, together with the kuge, formed a new aristocracy, the kazoku. In 1871, the han were abolished, and prefectures were established. In this year, around 200 daimyo returned their titles to the emperor, who consolidated their han into 75 prefectures. Their military forces were also demobilized, with the daimyo and their samurai followers pensioned into retirement. The move to abolish the feudal domains effectively ended the daimyo era in Japan. This was effectively carried out through the financial collapse of the feudal-domain governments, hampering their capability for resistance.

In the wake of the changes, many daimyo remained in control of their lands, being appointed as prefectural governors; however, they were soon relieved of this duty and called en masse to Tokyo, thereby cutting off any independent base of power from which to potentially rebel.

Despite this, members of former daimyo families remained prominent in government and society, and in some cases continue to remain prominent to the present day. For example, Morihiro Hosokawa, the former Prime Minister of Japan, is a descendant of the daimyo of Kumamoto.

== See also ==
- Japanese clans
- History of Japan
- Daimyo Clock Museum
