= Jōnan-ku =

Coordinates: 33°34′33″N 130°22′12″E

Jōnan 城南区
- Ward
- Jōnan Ward
- Flag Seal

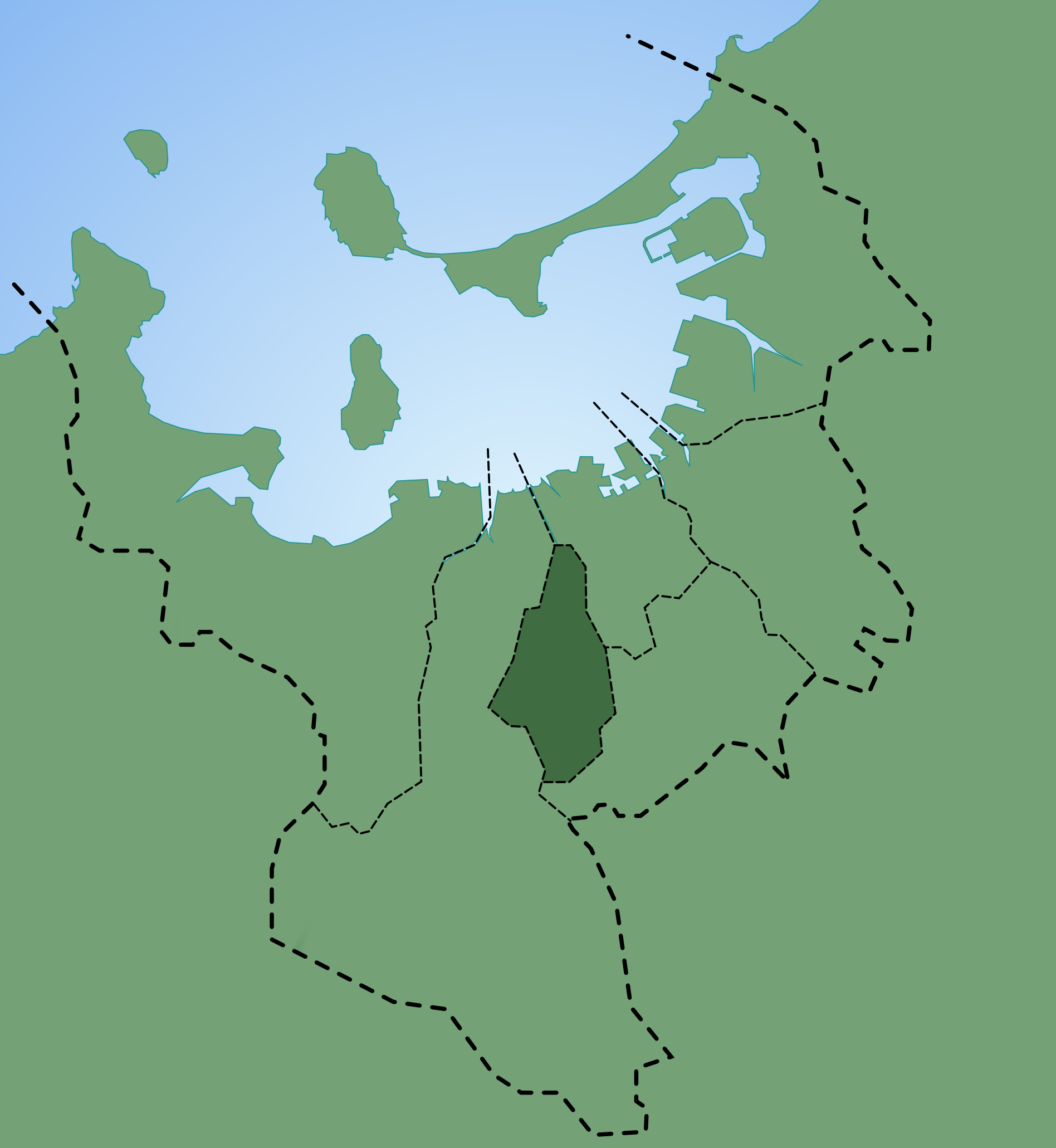
- Location of Jōnan Ward in Fukuoka
- Country: Japan
- Region: Kyushu
- Prefecture: Fukuoka
- City: Fukuoka
- Time zone: UTC+9 (Japan Standard Time)

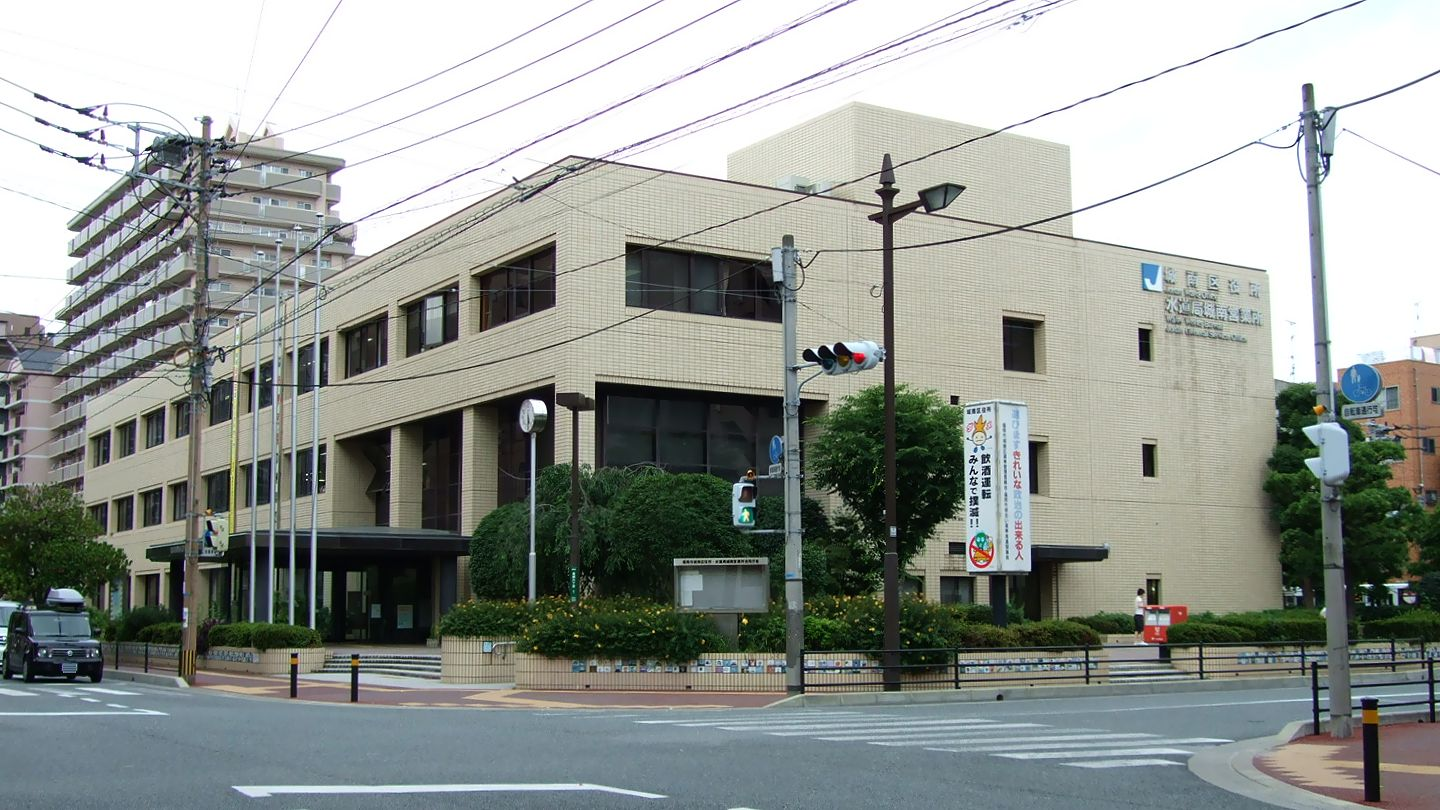
Jōnan ward office

Jōnan-ku (城南区) is one of the seven wards of Fukuoka City, Japan. As of November 1, 2004, it had a population of 128,057 people, making up 9.2% of Fukuoka City, with an area of 16.02 km^{2}. At the time of Fukuoka City's official designation as a City in 1972, the area now known as Jōnan-ku was part of the larger ward of Nishi-ku. On May 1, 1982, Nishi-ku was subdivided into the three smaller wards of Nishi-ku, Sawara-ku and Jōnan-ku.

Located southwest of the downtown area of Tenjin, Jōnan-ku is a primarily residential area. Despite its proximity to downtown Fukuoka, Jōnan-ku has suffered from a lack of transport infrastructure, leading to congested roads and difficult access to the rest of the city. The Nanakuma Line of the Fukuoka Subway opened in 2005, improving traffic flow in the area.

Like most of Fukuoka City, the construction in Jōnan-ku is relatively recent, as the area consisted mostly of fields after World War 2, lacking even paved roads. The result has been a crowded jumble of roads, houses, apartment buildings and businesses, with no real centre to the ward. A few large parks help to create a peaceful atmosphere.

Jōnan-ku is home to Fukuoka University, whose students are everpresent during the school year and help support a growing number of local convenience stores. The St Sulpice Great Seminary of Fukuoka is another notable landmark, having been built in the 1950s and serving to train Japanese Catholic priests from Kyūshū.

Historical sites include Kikuchi Shrine and Yūsentei Park.

== Gallery ==
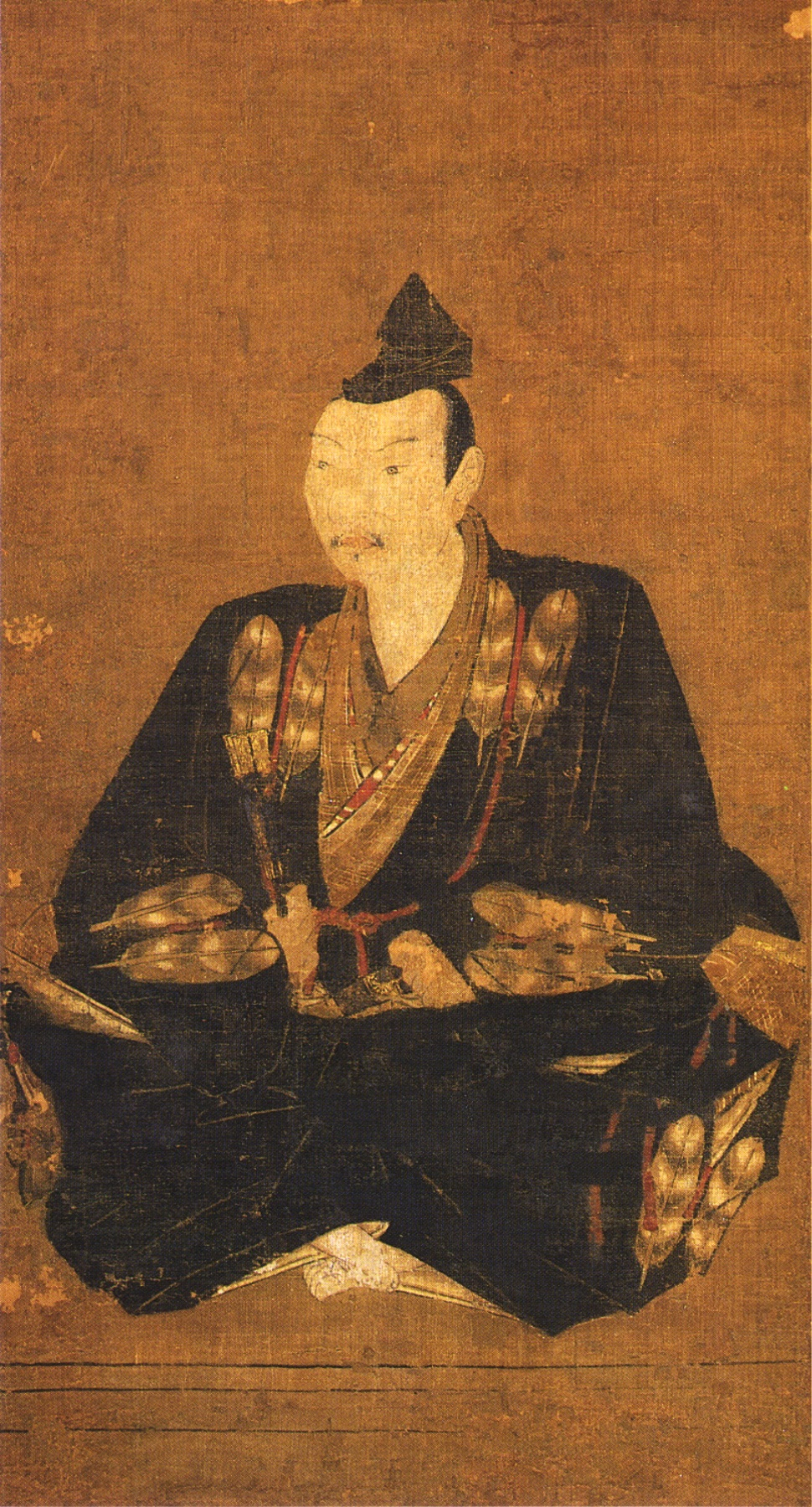
Portrait said to be of Kikuchi Yoshiyuki, Kikuchi Shrine

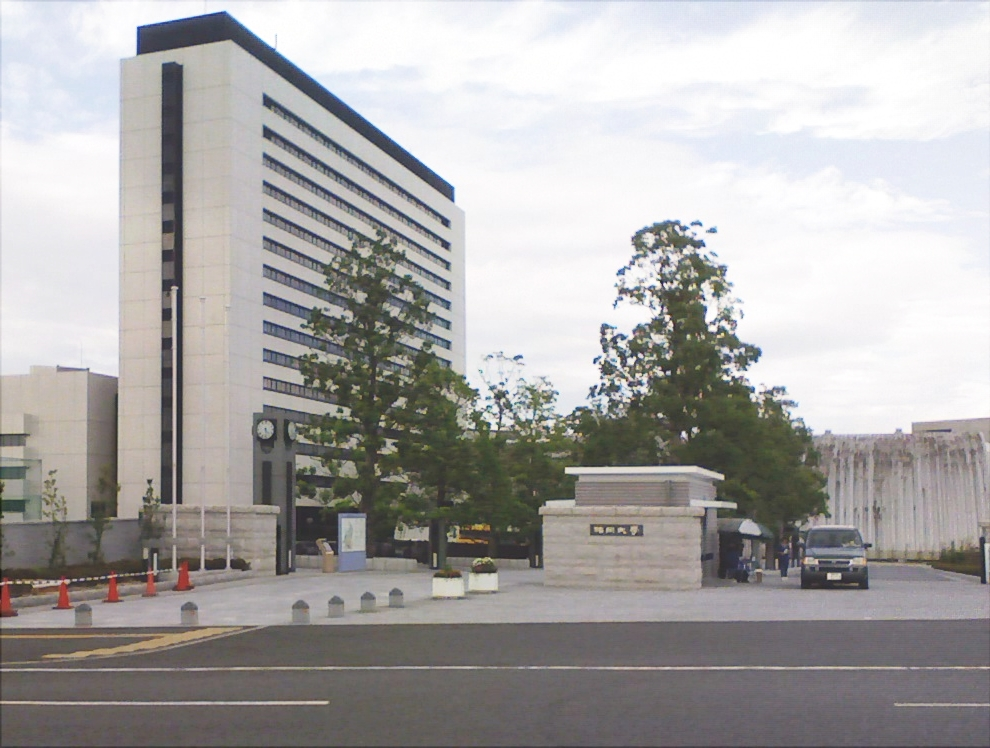
Fukuoka University

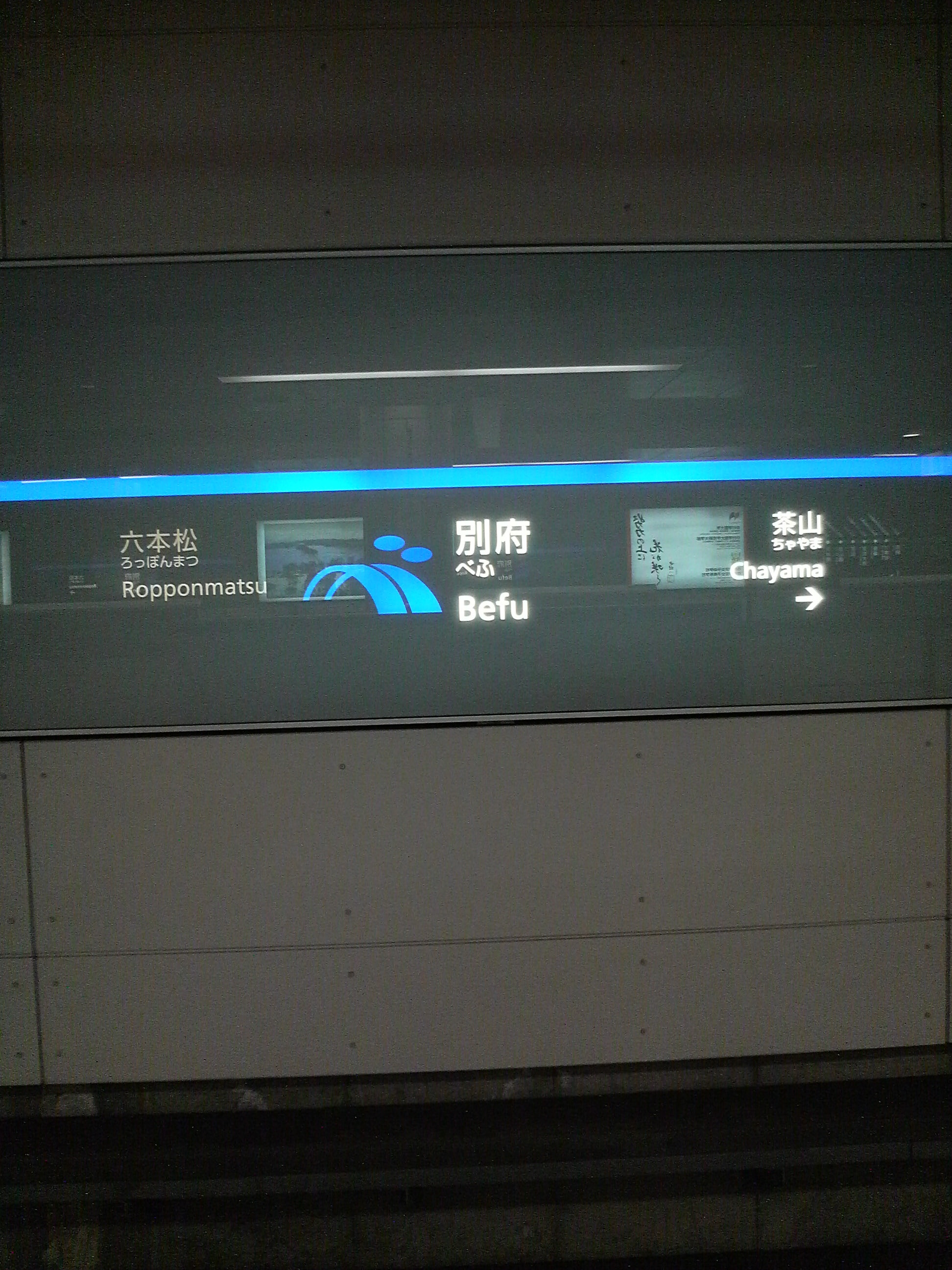
Stations of Fukuoka Subway

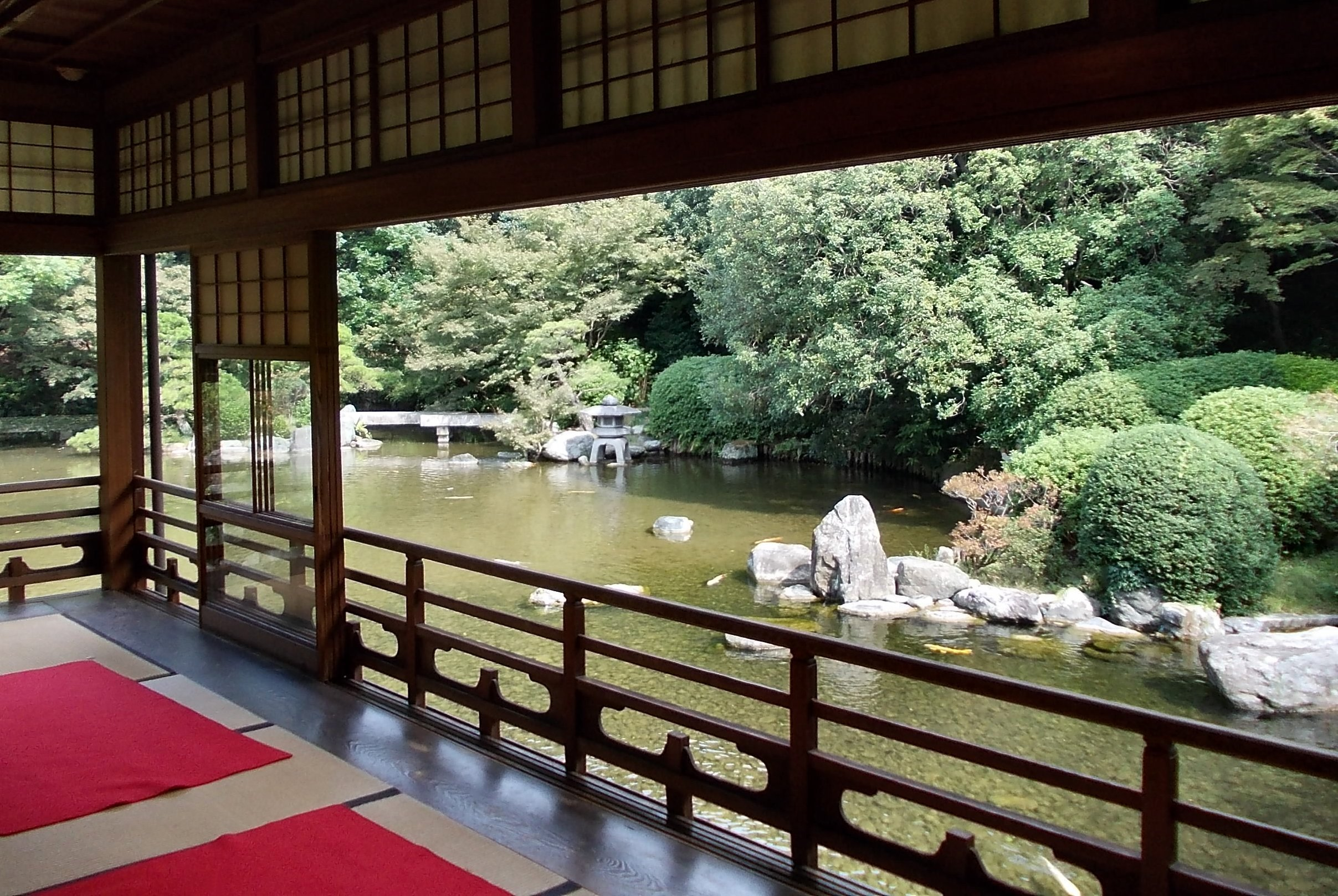
Yūsentei Park
