= Ōhorikōen Station =

Metro station in Fukuoka, Japan

Coordinates: 33.5899°N 130.3788°E

K06 Ōhorikōen Station 大濠公園駅
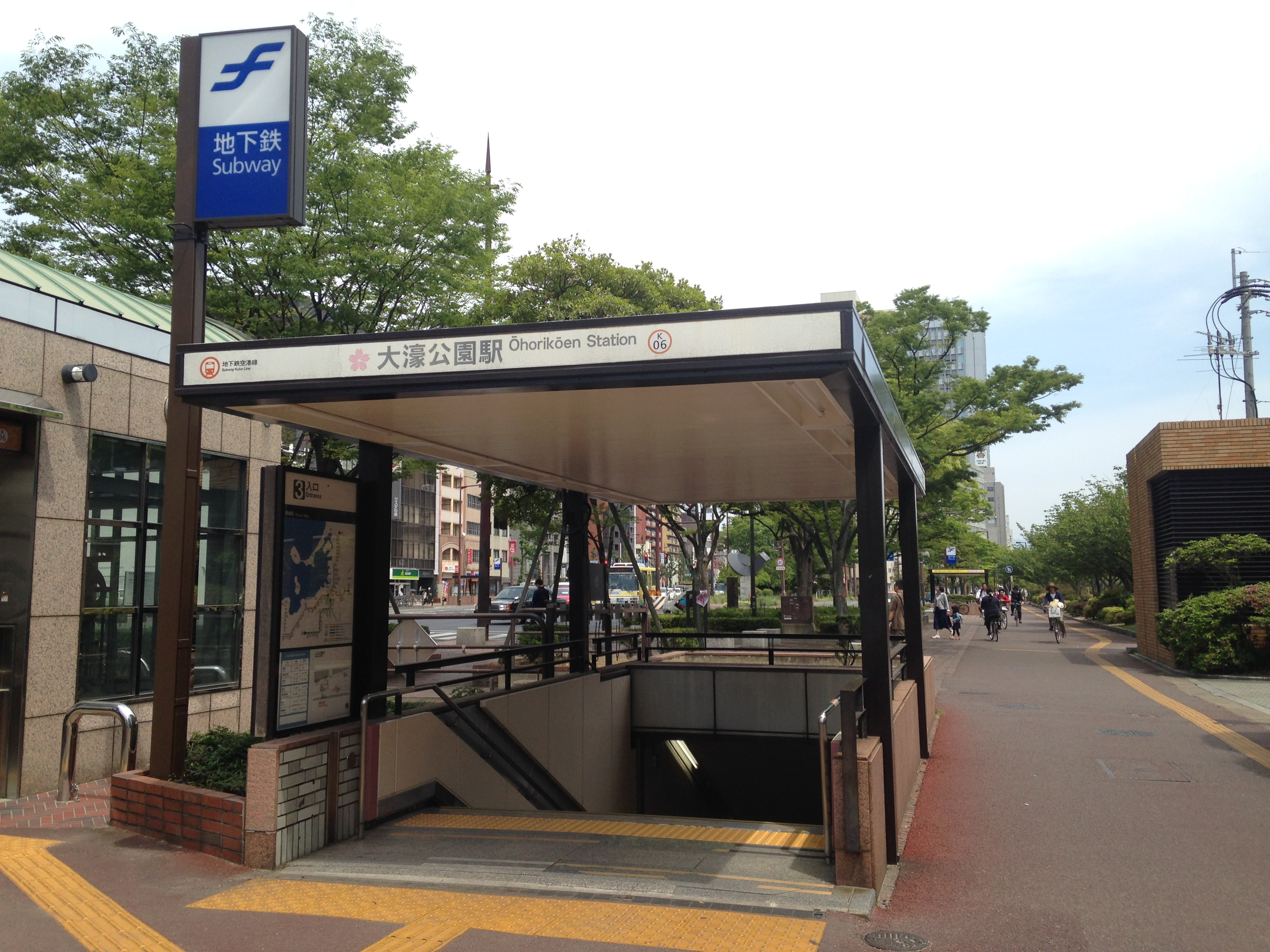
- Entrance No.3

General information
- Location: Chūō, Fukuoka, Fukuoka; Japan
- System: Fukuoka City Subway station
- Operator: Fukuoka City Subway
- Line: Airport Line

Other information
- Station code: K06

History
- Opened: 26 July 1981; 45 years ago

Passengers
- 2006: 7,190 daily

Services
Preceding station	Fukuoka City Subway	Following station
Tōjinmachi K05 towards Meinohama	Airport Line	Akasaka K07 towards Fukuoka Airport
Location
- Location within Fukuoka city

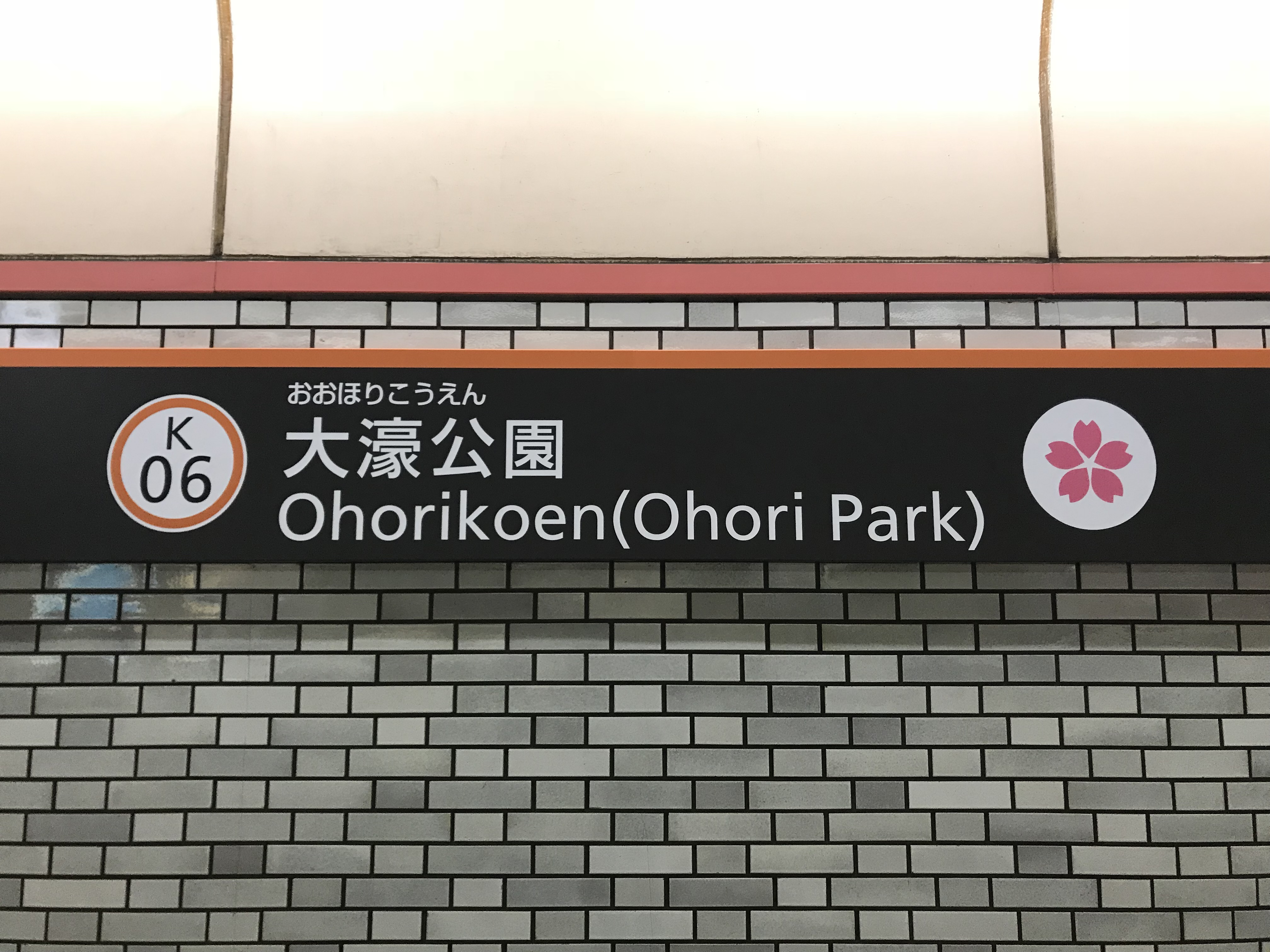
Station sign, February 2018

Ōhorikōen Station (大濠公園駅, Ōhorikōen-eki) is a railway station located in Chūō-ku, Fukuoka in Japan. Its station symbol is a Japanese cherry blossom in pink, because many cherry blossom trees are planted near this station.

== Lines ==
- Fukuoka City Subway
  - Airport Line

== Platforms ==
1	■ Kūkō Line	for Tenjin, Hakata, Fukuoka Airport and Kaizuka
2	■ Kūkō Line	for Meinohama, Chikuzen-Maebaru and Karatsu

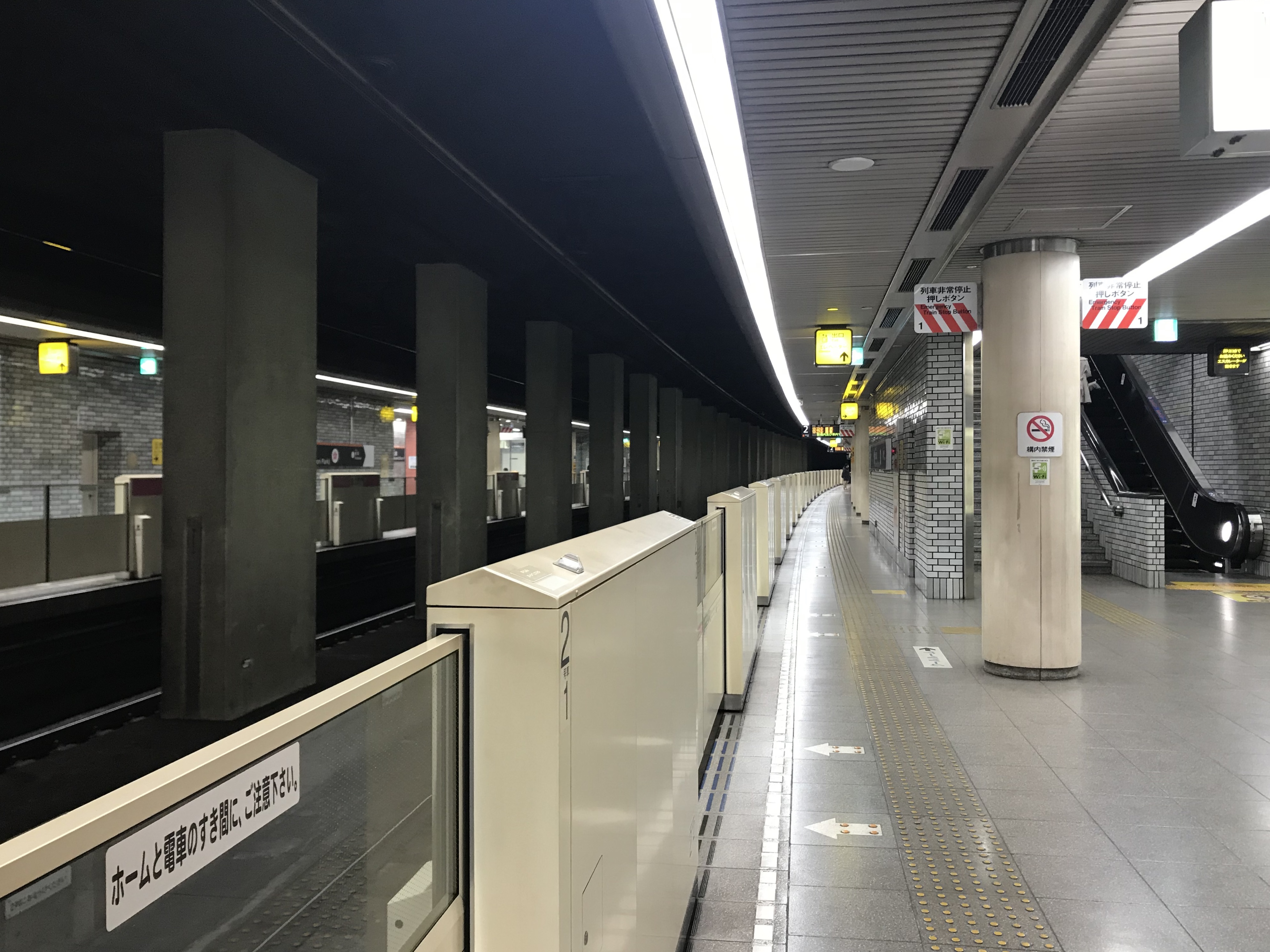
Platform

== Vicinity ==
- Fukuoka Family Court
- Ōhori Post Office
- Konkokyo Branch
- Tenrikyo Branch
- Ōhori Park
- Ōhori Park Noh Theater
- Fukuoka Art Museum
- Fukuoka Elementary School Attached to Fukuoka University of Education
- Fukuoka Junior High School Attached to Fukuoka University of Education
- Ōhori Junior High School and High School Attached to Fukuoka University
- Nishi Park (ja)
- Fukuoka Castle Ruins (Maizuru Park (ja))
- Heiwadai Stadium
- Fukuoka Financial Group, Inc.
- Fukuoka District Meteorological Observatory
- NHK Fukuoka broadcasting station
- Japan Post Insurance's Fukuoka Service center
