= Tōjinmachi Station =

Metro station in Fukuoka, Japan

Coordinates: 33.5902°N 130.3703°E

K05 Tōjinmachi Station 唐人町駅
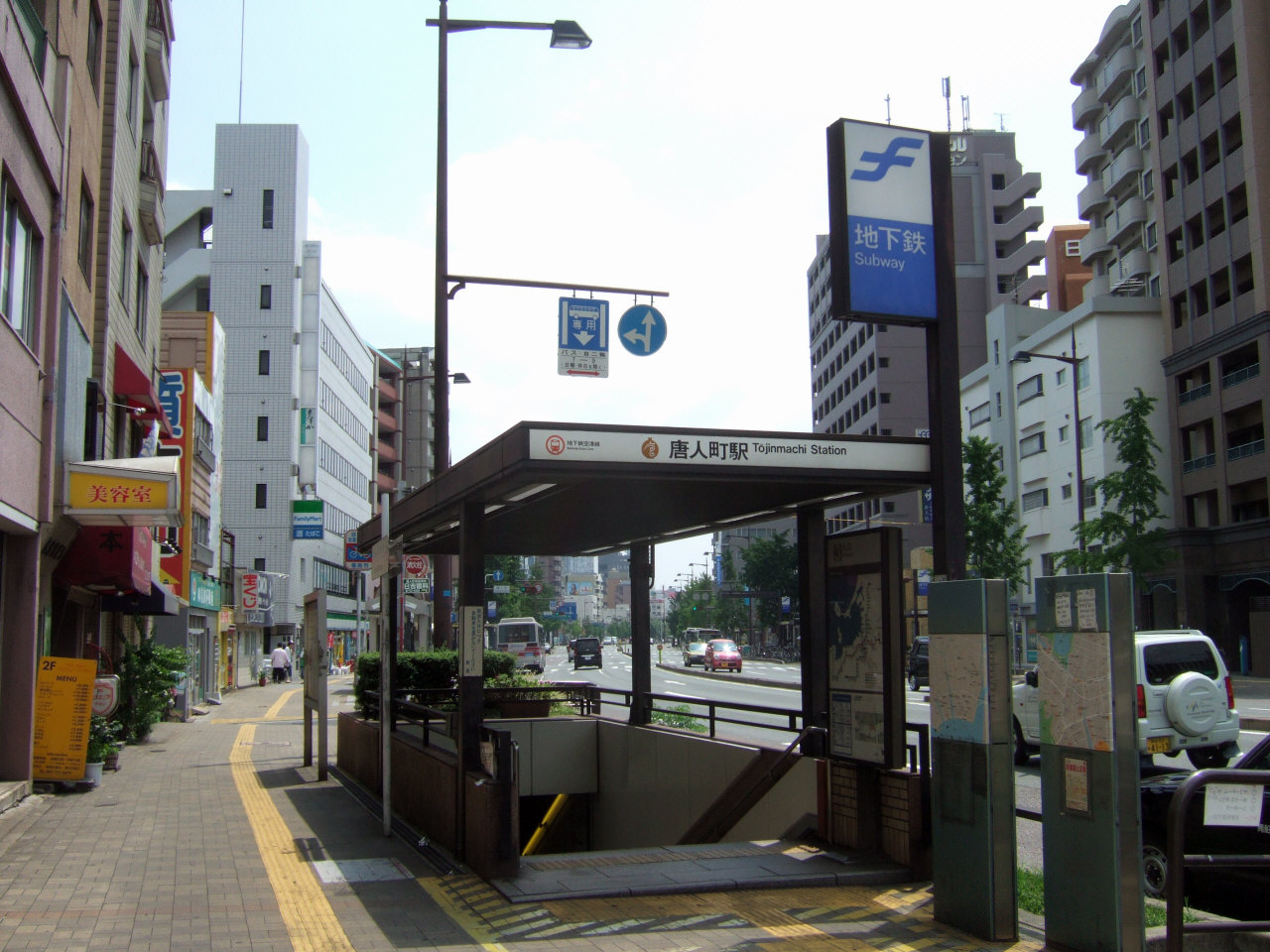
- Entrance No.3

General information
- Location: Chūō, Fukuoka, Fukuoka; Japan
- System: Fukuoka City Subway station
- Operator: Fukuoka City Subway
- Line: Airport Line

Other information
- Station code: K05

History
- Opened: 26 July 1981; 45 years ago

Passengers
- 2006: 7,190 daily

Services
Preceding station	Fukuoka City Subway	Following station
Nishijin K04 towards Meinohama	Airport Line	Ōhorikōen K06 towards Fukuoka Airport
Location
- Location within Fukuoka city

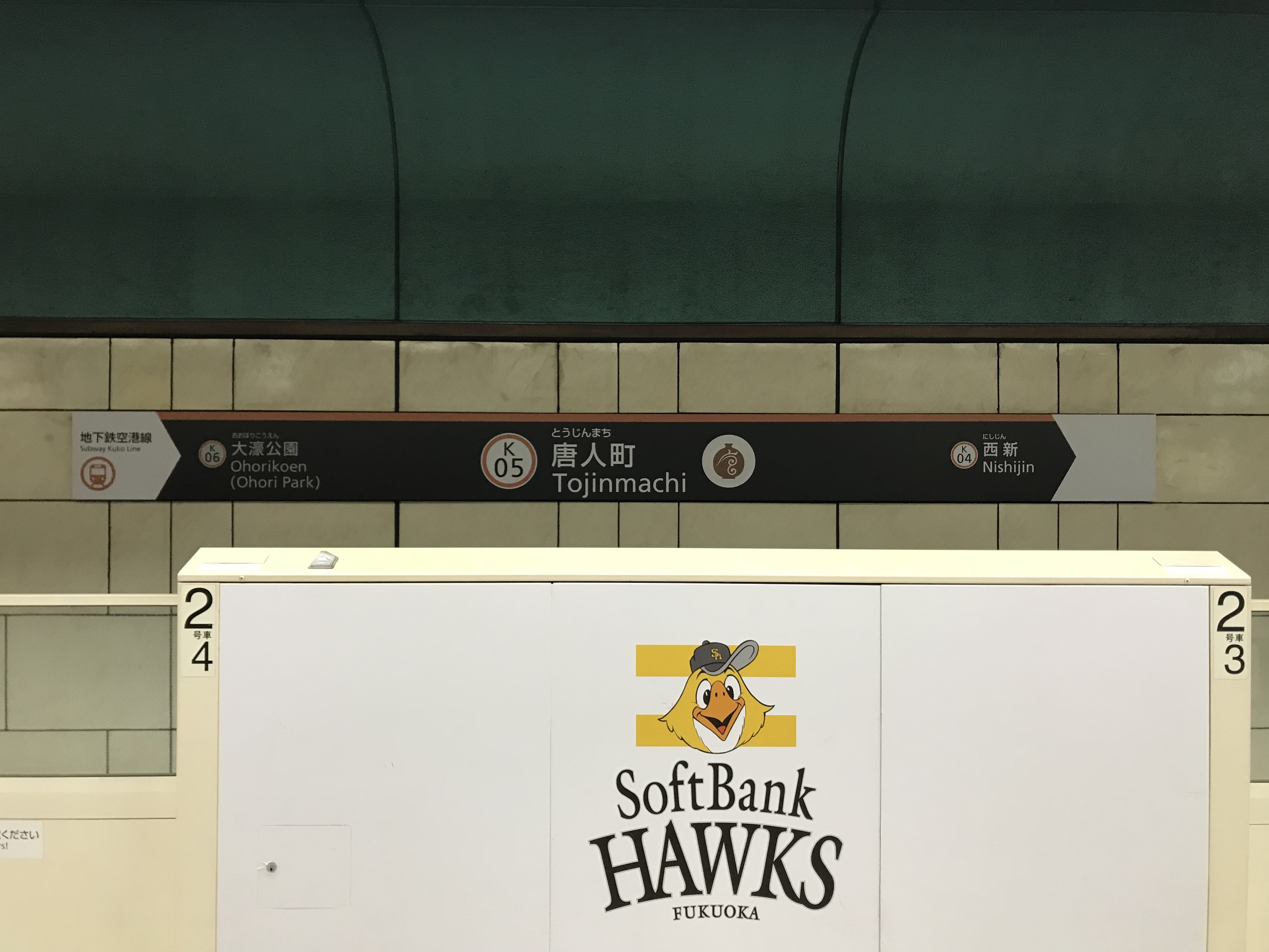
Station sign

Tōjinmachi Station (唐人町駅, Tōjinmachi-eki) is a train station located in Chūō-ku. The station's symbol mark is a vase which is designed like an arabesque scroll to look like the letter "唐". It has the station number "K05".

== Lines ==
- Fukuoka City Subway
  - Airport Line

== Platforms ==
1	■ Kūkō Line	for Tenjin, Hakata, Fukuoka Airport and Kaizuka
2	■ Kūkō Line	for Meinohama, Chikuzen-Maebaru and Karatsu

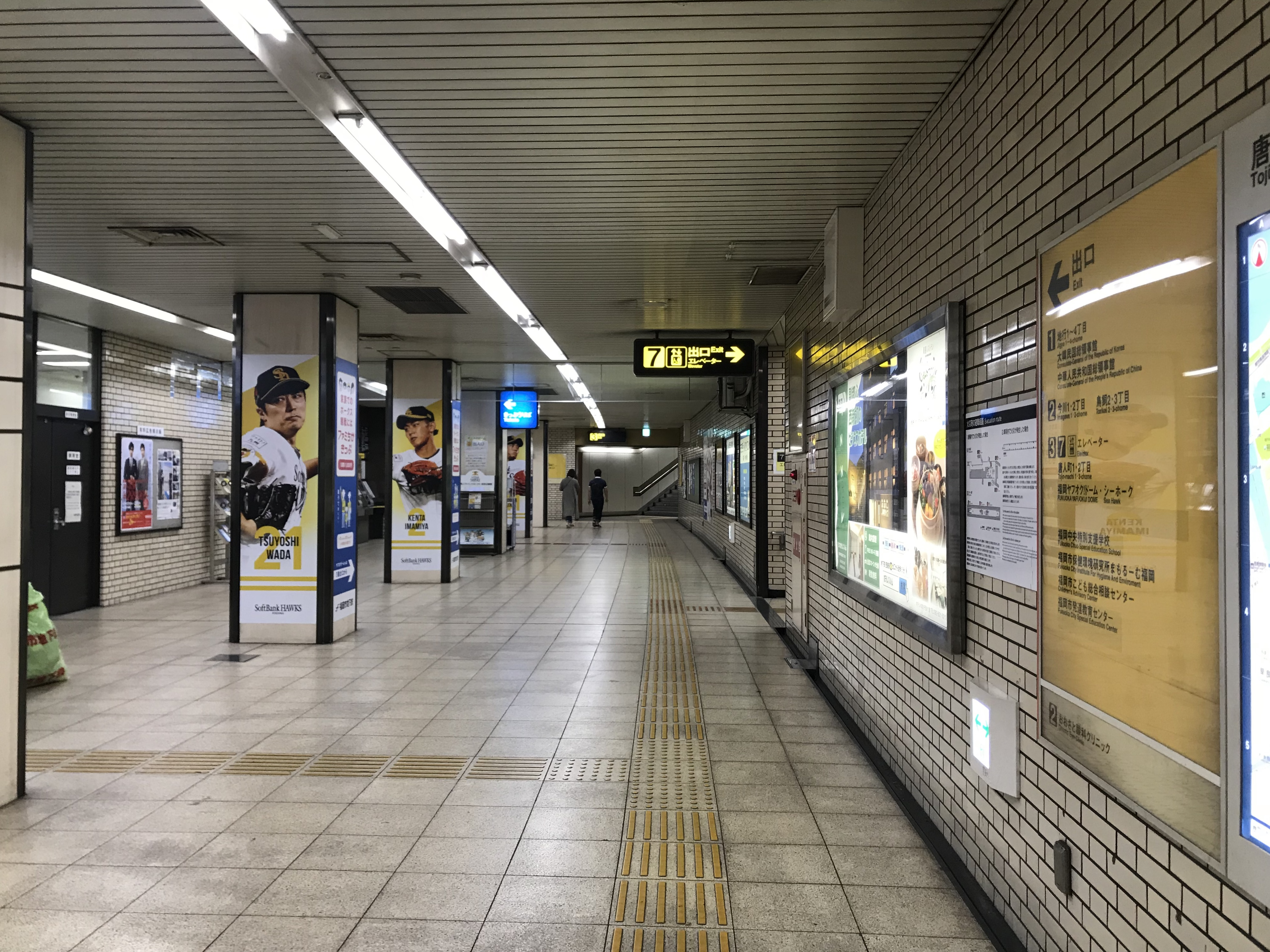
Concourse

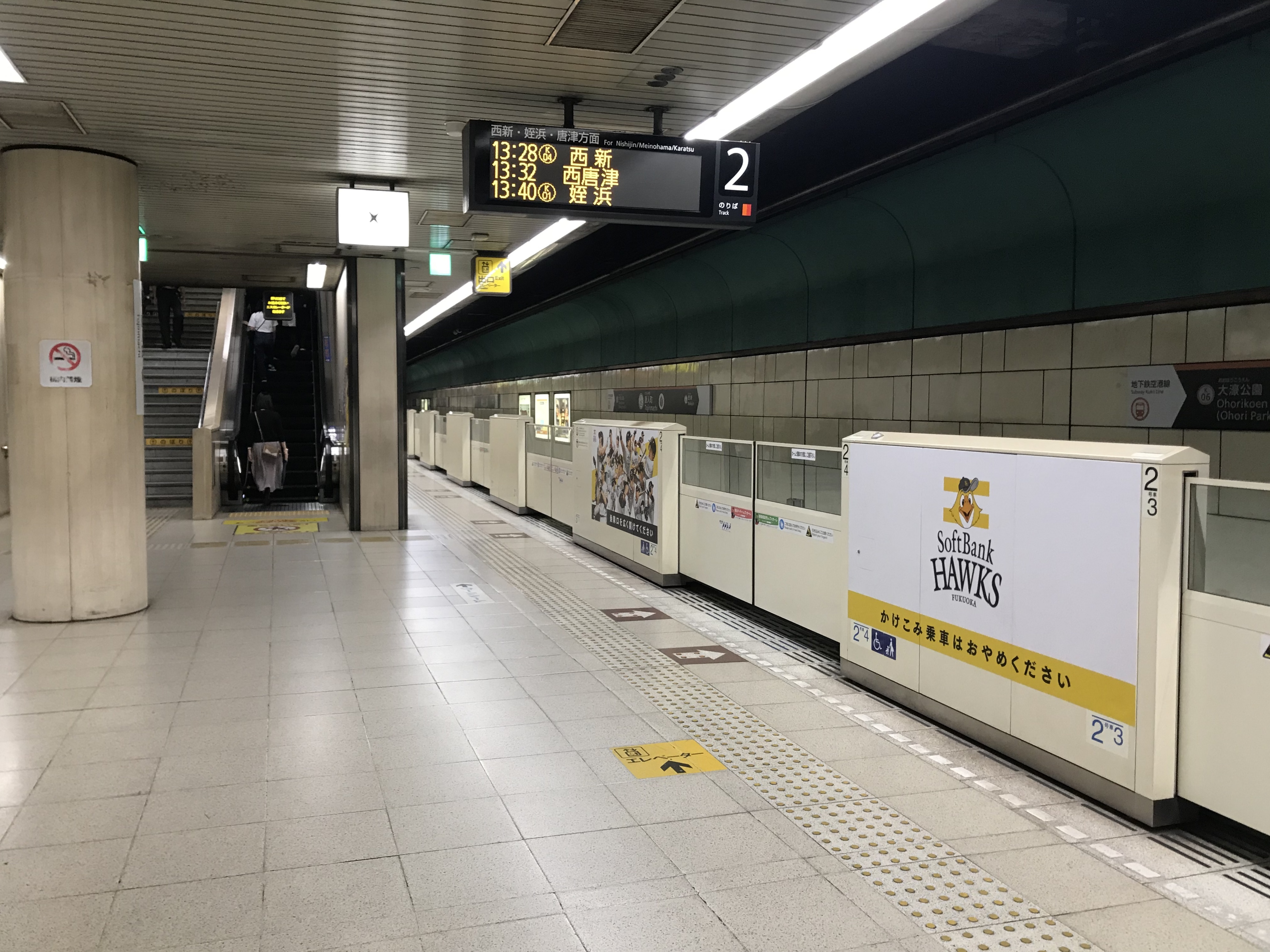
Platform

== Vicinity ==
- Hawks Town (approx. 15 minutes by foot)
  - Fukuoka Yahoo! Japan Dome
  - Hilton Fukuoka Seahawk (ex-JAL Resort Seahawk Hotel Fukuoka)
  - Zepp Fukuoka
  - HKT48 Theater
- National Hospital Organization Kyushu medical center (just across from Fukuoka Dome)
- Tōjinmachi Shopping District
- Heiwadai Hotel 5
- several Elementary and High Schools
- Nishi-nippon Junior College
- United States Consulate
- Republic of Korea Consulate General
