= Akasaka Station (Fukuoka) =

Metro station in Fukuoka, Japan

K07 Akasaka Station 赤坂駅
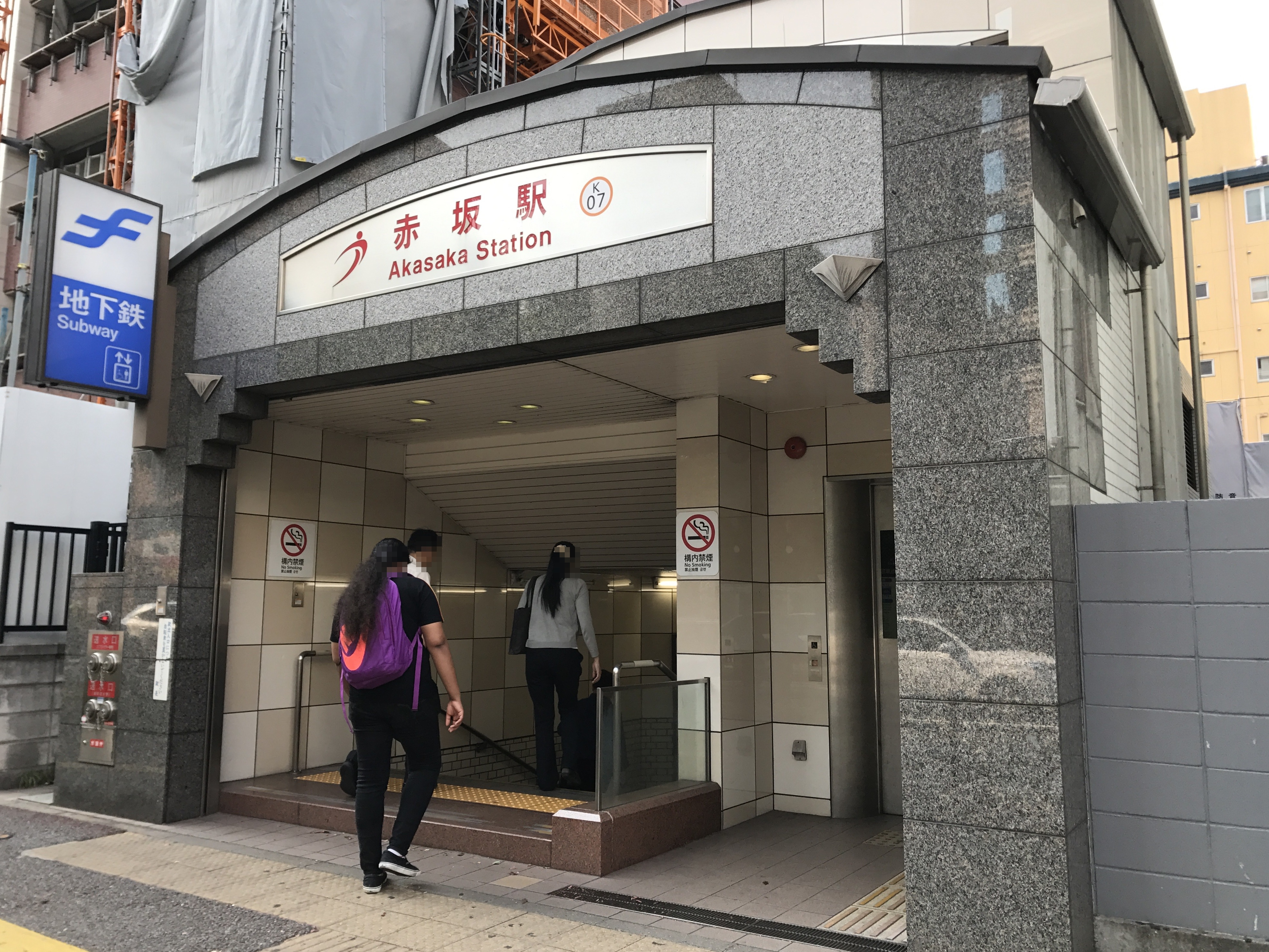
- Entrance No.1

General information
- Location: Chūō, Fukuoka, Fukuoka; Japan
- Coordinates: 33°35′21″N 130°23′28″E
- System: Fukuoka City Subway station
- Operator: Fukuoka City Subway
- Line: Airport Line

Other information
- Station code: K07

History
- Opened: 26 July 1981; 45 years ago

Services
Preceding station	Fukuoka City Subway	Following station
Ōhorikōen K06 towards Meinohama	Airport Line	Tenjin K08 towards Fukuoka Airport
Location
- Location within Fukuoka city

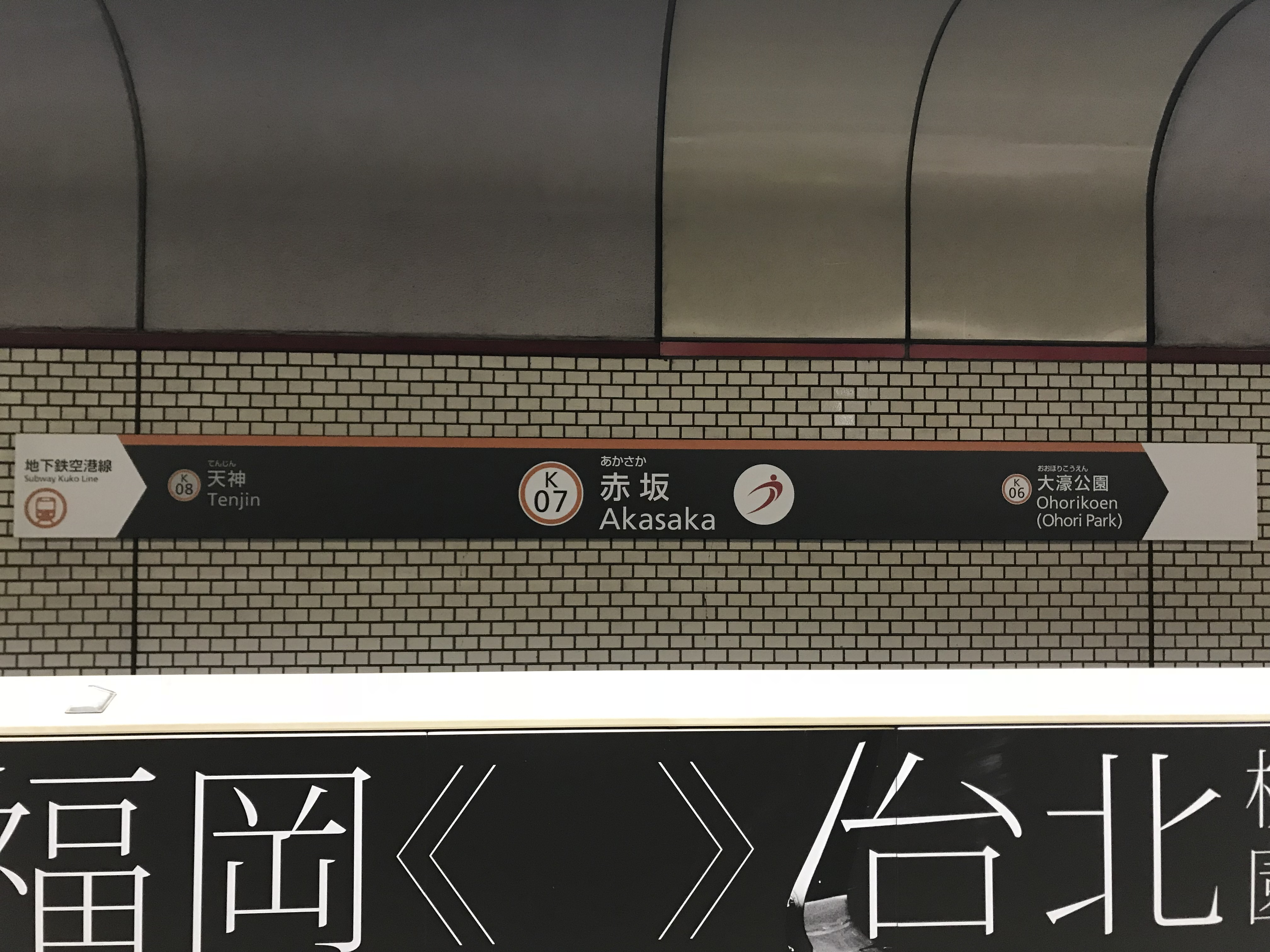
Station sign

Akasaka Station (赤坂駅, Akasaka-eki) is a railway station in Chūō-ku, Fukuoka in Japan. Its station symbol is a track and field athlete in red that looks like "ア" which is Akasaka's initials, in connection with the annual Fukuoka Marathon, which starts and finishes at Heiwadai Athletic Stadium, located 600 m from this station.

== Lines ==
Akasaka Station is served by the Fukuoka City Subway Airport Line.

== Platforms ==
1	■ Airport Line	for Tenjin, Hakata, Fukuoka Airport, and Kaizuka
2	■ Airport Line	for Meinohama, Chikuzen-Maebaru, and Karatsu

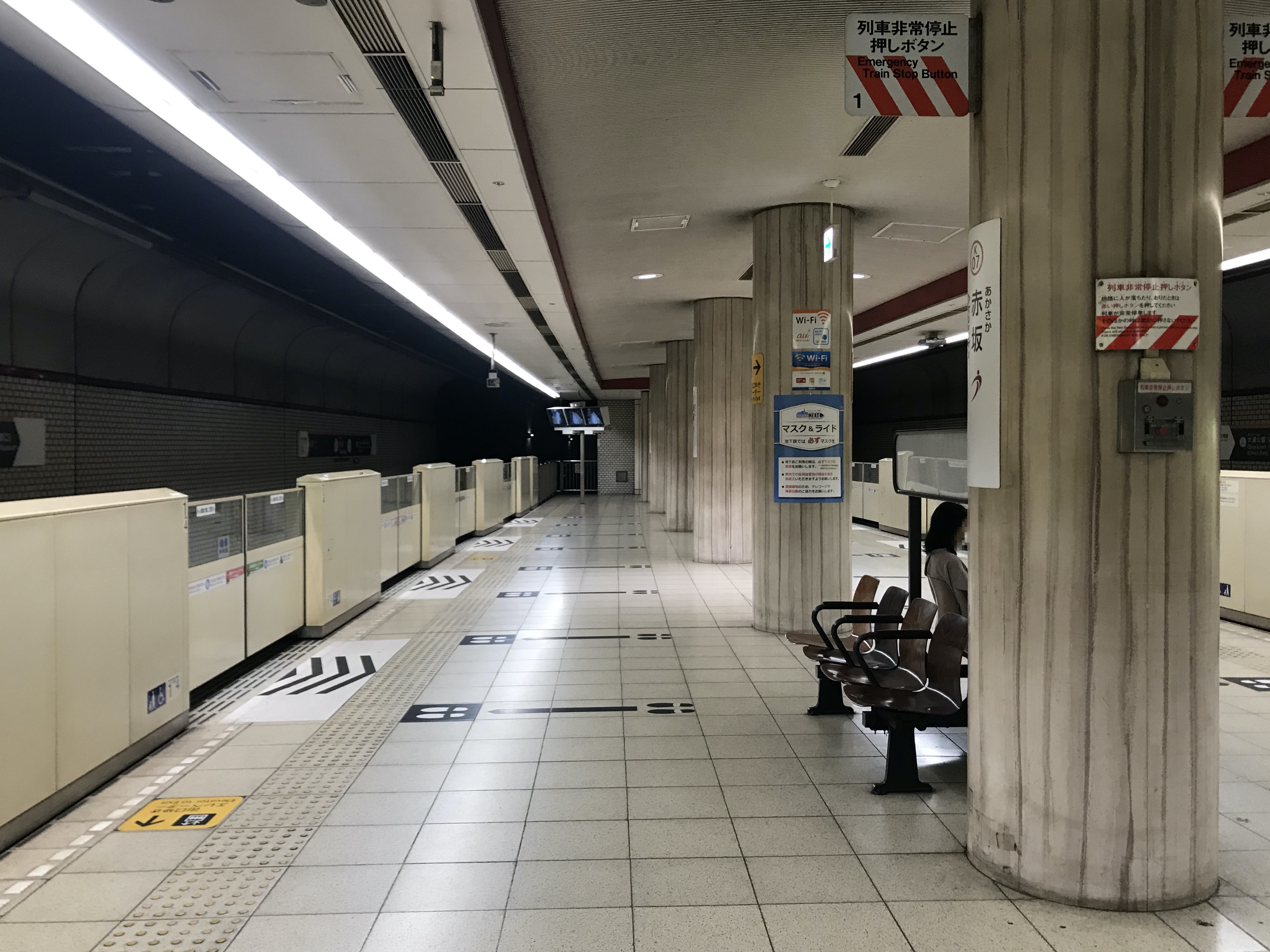
Platform

== History ==
The station opened on 26 July 1981.

== Surrounding area ==
- Fukuoka Central District Office
- Fukuoka Transportation Bureau
- Maizuru Park
- Korokan Ruins, Exhibition Hall (formerly Heiwadai Stadium)
- Fukuoka Castle
- Heiwadai Athletic Stadium
- Fukuoka High Court
- Fukuoka District Court
- Fukuoka Legal Affairs Bureau
- Fukuoka Public Prosecutors Office
- Fukuoka Central Employment Office
- Central City Health Center
- Fukuoka City Civic Center
- Fukuoka Central Fish Wholesale Market
