= Mizuho PayPay Dome Fukuoka =

Baseball stadium in Chūō-ku, Fukuoka

- みずほPayPayドーム福岡
- PayPay Dome; Fukuoka Dome

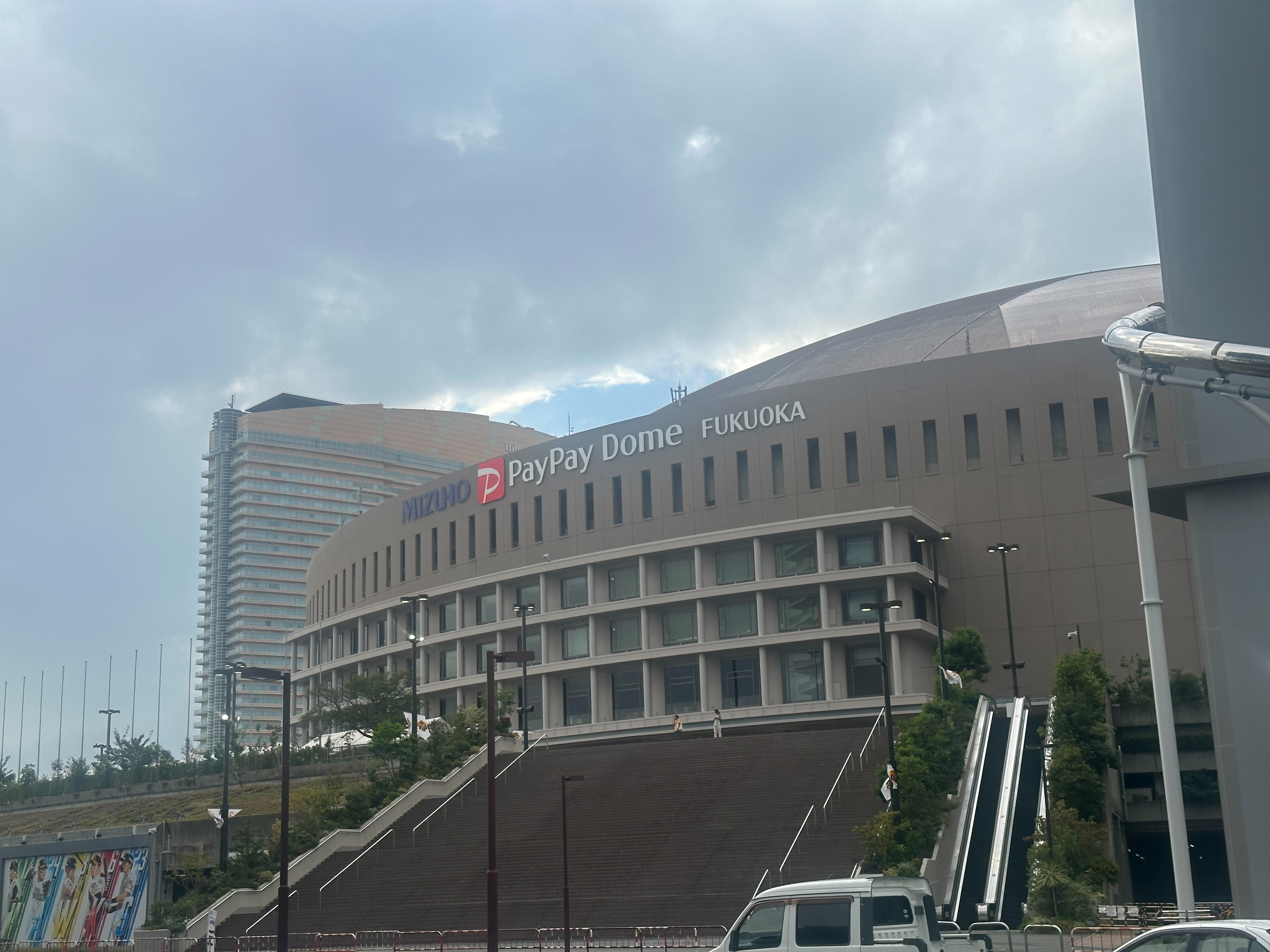
- Interactive map of Mizuho PayPay Dome Fukuoka
- Full name: Fukuoka Dome
- Former names: Fukuoka Dome (1993–2005); Fukuoka Yahoo! JAPAN Dome (2005–2013); Fukuoka Yafuoku! Dome (2013–2020); Fukuoka PayPay Dome (2020–2024)
- Address: 2-2-2 Jigyōhama, Chūō-ku
- Location: Fukuoka, Japan
- Coordinates: 33°35′43″N 130°21′44″E
- Owner: Fukuoka SoftBank Hawks
- Operator: Hawks Town Co.
- Capacity: 40,142 (baseball); 47,500 (concert)
- Surface: MS Craft Baseball Turf (2026–present); FieldTurf (2009–2025); AstroTurf (1993–2008)
- Field size: Left Field – 100 metres (328 ft); Left-Center – 110 metres (361 ft); Center Field – 122 metres (400 ft); Right-Center – 110 metres (361 ft); Right Field – 100 metres (328 ft); Outfield Fence Height: 5.84m (19.2ft)
- Public transit: Fukuoka City Subway: Airport Line at Tojinmachi

Construction
- Groundbreaking: April 1, 1991; 35 years ago
- Opened: April 2, 1993; 33 years ago
- Cost: ¥76 billion
- Architects: Takenaka Corporation and Maeda Corporation
- General contractors: Takenaka Corporation and Maeda Corporation

Tenant
- Fukuoka Daiei Hawks/Fukuoka SoftBank Hawks (1993–present)

The Mizuho PayPay Dome Fukuoka (みずほPayPayドーム福岡, Mizuho Peipei Dōmu Fukuoka), officially the Fukuoka Dome (福岡ドーム, Fukuoka Dōmu), is a domed baseball field located in Chūō-ku, Fukuoka, Japan. Home to the Fukuoka SoftBank Hawks, the 40,000 seat stadium was built in 1993 and was originally named Fukuoka Dome. It is Japan's first stadium built with a retractable roof, and was the only baseball stadium in Japan with one until the opening of Es Con Field Hokkaido in 2023. It is the largest primary home stadium in the Pacific League.

== History ==
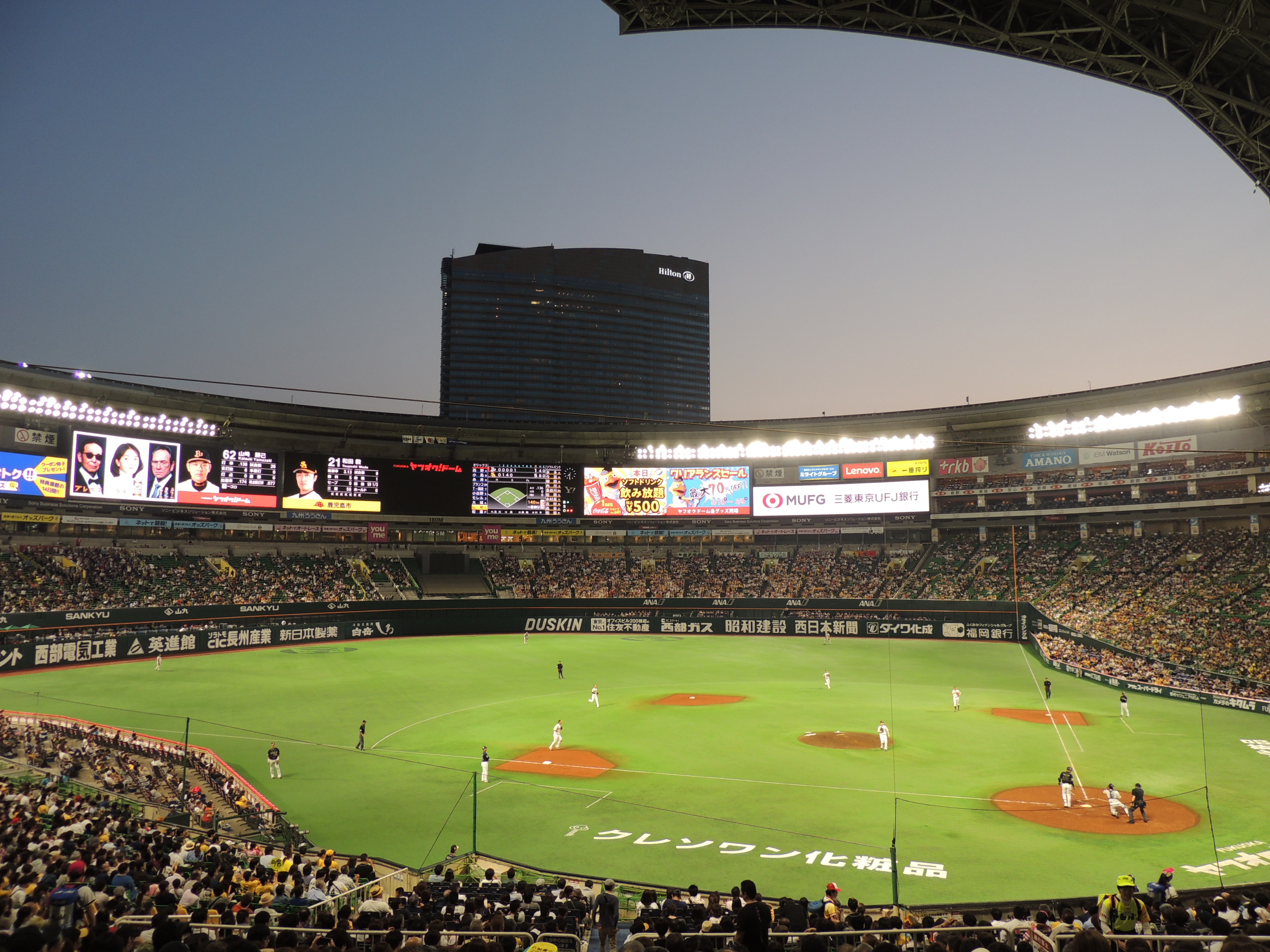
Dome interior open in 2016

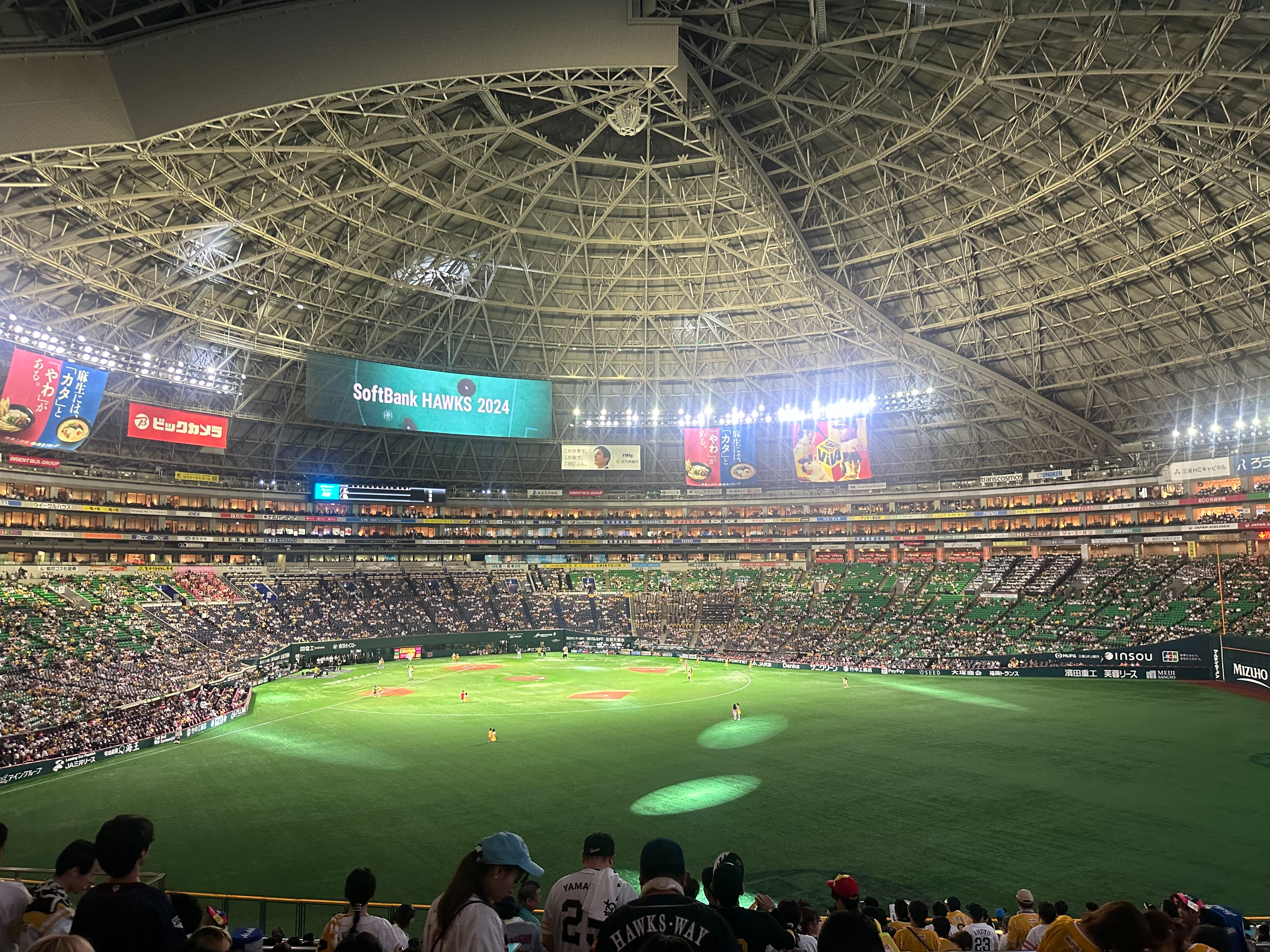
Dome interior closed in 2024

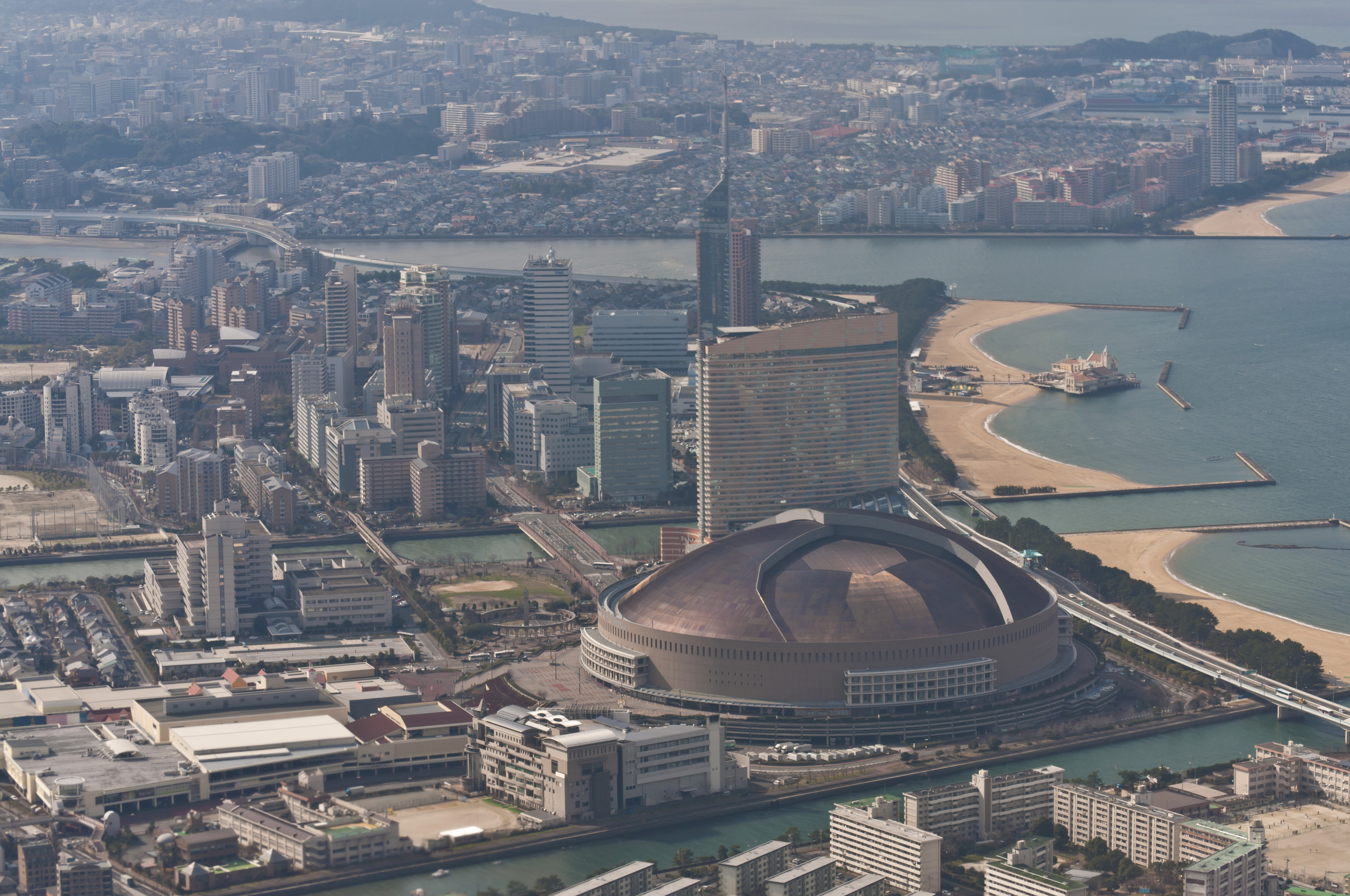
Fukuoka Seaside Momochi aerial view

Fukuoka Dome is the home stadium of Fukuoka SoftBank Hawks and, together with Hilton Fukuoka Sea Hawk Hotel, is part of the Hawks Town entertainment complex. It is located near Momochi Beach, and a 15 minute walk from Tōjinmachi Station, a part of the Fukuoka City Subway system.

In 2003, Colony Capital purchased the stadium with accompanying hotels from Daiei. In the process, Colony assumed ¥60 billion in debts with the properties along with a ¥15 billion capital infusion for renovations.

After the sale of the stadium's primary tenant, the Fukuoka SoftBank Hawks, from supermarket chain Daiei to multinational technology investment company SoftBank on January 28, 2005, Yahoo! Japan, one of SoftBank's subsidiaries, acquired the stadium's naming rights, and thus renamed it Fukuoka Yahoo! Japan Dome (福岡Yahoo! JAPANドーム, Fukuoka Yafū Japan Dōmu) or abbreviated as Yahoo Dome (ヤフードーム, Yafū Dōmu). At the same time, SoftBank agreed to lease the rights to the Fukuoka Dome for 4.8 billion yen per year for 20 years.

In 2006, the stadium received an upgrade to its mono-color main scoreboard "Hawks Vision." Sharing the same nickname as its predecessor and measured at 10 m (32.76 ft) high and 53 m (173.86 ft) wide, it was one of the largest high-definition electronic scoreboards at the time, equivalent to a 2,123-inch wide-screen display. In 2010, with further addition of two 5.7 m (120.65 ft) × 33 m (108.27 ft) displays, the stadium boasted the largest total viewing area of HD display in all baseball stadia (total area 905.2sqm or 9,743.49sqft).

On April 12, 2007, the Fukuoka Dome and Hawks Town complex was sold to an affiliate of the GIC.

In 2009, the older, short-pile AstroTurf field was replaced with the more modern grass-like FieldTurf brand surface to reduce injuries; the Hawks players had seen far more injuries than any other team in Japan prior to the field being replaced.

On March 24, 2012, SoftBank purchased the stadium from the GIC affiliate for 87 billion yen. The stadium became fully owned by the Fukuoka SoftBank Hawks Marketing Corporation on July 1, 2015. The adjacent shopping mall was sold to Mitsubishi Estate on January 22, 2015.

In January 2013, it was renamed to Fukuoka Yafuoku! Dome (福岡ヤフオク! ドーム, Fukuoka Yafuoku Dōmu). Yafuoku is the abbreviation for Yahoo! Auctions in Japan.

On October 30, 2019, it was announced that the stadium was going to be renamed again to Fukuoka PayPay Dome (福岡PayPayドーム, Fukuoka Peipei Dōmu), in reference to the payment system PayPay owned by SoftBank (50%) and Yahoo Japan (25%), on February 29, 2020.

On April 25, 2024, it was announced that the stadium would be getting additional sponsorship rights from Mizuho Financial Group, creating Mizuho PayPay Dome Fukuoka as a symbol of unity between Mizuho and SoftBank Group, which have close ties to each other.

The Fukuoka Dome has hosted one game in each Major League Baseball Japan All-Star Series since its creation, including the final game of the 2006 series, where Japan was swept for the first time in the history of the event.

In the TV series Extreme Engineering, Danny Forster makes a reference to the Fukuoka Dome, saying it was said to have a "floating" field. (An indoor baseball stadium in Japan which actually has a floating field is Sapporo Dome, which also hosts football games for Consadole Sapporo, a J. League club. However, this stadium does not have such a field.)

The roof of the Fukuoka Dome was designed to be opened similar to that of the now demolished Civic Arena in Pittsburgh, where the roof would open from the side. This design causes the roof to be rarely opened, due to costs of electricity to the mechanics to open the roof.

The Building itself is recognized for its 12,000 ton steel retractable roof with a 3 millimeter titanium plating.

== Notable events ==
=== NPB ===
On May 18, 1994, Hiromi Makihara of the Yomiuri Giants threw a perfect game against Hiroshima Toyo Carp as the Giants won 6–0. Makihara's first Perfect-game at Fukuoka Dome is of special note as it being the only one thrown there, as well as the last one in the NPB (15th overall) until Rōki Sasaki pitched a perfect game against the Orix Buffaloes on April 10, 2022, at ZOZO Marine Stadium.

=== 1995 Summer Universiade ===
The stadium had the function of being the main venue of the event, hosting the opening ceremonies, baseball tournament and the closing ceremonies.

=== Concerts ===
Michael Jackson performed at the stadium four times during his solo career. The first two times, Jackson performed two sold-out concerts during his Dangerous World Tour, on September 10 & 11, 1993, for a total audience of 70,000 fans (35,000 per show). The second and last two times were in 1996, during his subsequent tour, HIStory World Tour, on December 26 and 28, also on two sold-out concerts for 80,000 people (40,000 fans per show).

Whitney Houston performed at the stadium on September 22, 1993, during The Bodyguard World Tour.

Madonna performed three times at the stadium. The shows happened on 7, 8, and 9 December 1993 during The Girlie Show World Tour.

The stadium also hosted Frank Sinatra's final public concerts on 19 and 20 December 1994.

The Rolling Stones played two concerts at the dome during their Voodoo Lounge Tour on 22 and 23 March 1995.

Bon Jovi played a concert at the dome on May 13, 1995, during their These Days Tour.

On September 18 and 19, 2000, the stadium hosted L'Arc-en-Ciel as part of their "TOUR 2000 REAL".

Mariko Shinoda held her graduation concert at the stadium on July 21, 2013, as part of the AKB48 5 Big Dome Concert Tour, "AKB48 2013 Manatsu no Dome Tour ~Mada mada, Yaranakya Ikenai koto ga aru~ (AKB48・2013真夏のドームツアー ～まだまだ、やらなきゃいけないことがある～)" that summer.

Super Junior performed their Super Show 6 at the stadium on 20 December 2014 as part of their forth Asia tour, with a sold-out crowd of 47,874 people.

BTS held two concerts at the stadium on 16 and 17 February 2019 during their Love Yourself World Tour, with 72,801 sold-out tickets.

Blackpink had a sold-out concert in front of 38,864 audiences at the stadium on 22 February 2020 as part of their In Your Area World Tour.

Stray Kids performed two concerts at the stadium on 16 and 17 August 2023 as part of their 5-Star Dome Tour, with 75,000 sold-out crowds.

TVXQ (their Japanese name is Tohoshinki) had solo concerts in Fukuoka PayPay Dome for 9 days.

Perfume performed a show at the stadium for their First Nationwide Major Dome tour, 'P Cubed'.

Twice performed two concerts on December 16–17, 2023 as part of their Ready to be tour part 3, with 76,543 sold out crowds.

=== Professional wrestling ===
From 1993 until 1995 and then again in 2000 and 2001, New Japan Pro-Wrestling hosted a yearly show titled Wrestling Dontaku in the month of May at the Fukuoka Dome. No such show was held from 2001 until its return in 2009, but they have been held yearly since in the Fukuoka Kokusai Center. Wrestling Dontaku 2022 was hosted in the Fukuoka Dome once more as a part of celebrating the 50th anniversary of NJPW, though the show has since returned to the Fukuoka Kokusai Center.

In 2001, DDT Pro-Wrestling (then known as Dramatic Dream Team) hosted a 2-day tag team tournament in the venue. The tournament was won by Sanshiro Takagi and Tomohiko Hashimoto.

== Attendances ==
The home attendances of the Fukuoka SoftBank Hawks at the Mizuho PayPay Dome Fukuoka:

Season	Games	Total attendance	Average attendance
2025	71	2,717,929	38,281

Preceded by Heiwadai Stadium	Home of the Fukuoka SoftBank Hawks; 1993 – present	Succeeded by current
Preceded by Pilot Field; USA	Universiade; 1995	Succeeded by Stadio Angelo Massimino; Italy
