= 303 series =

Japanese train type

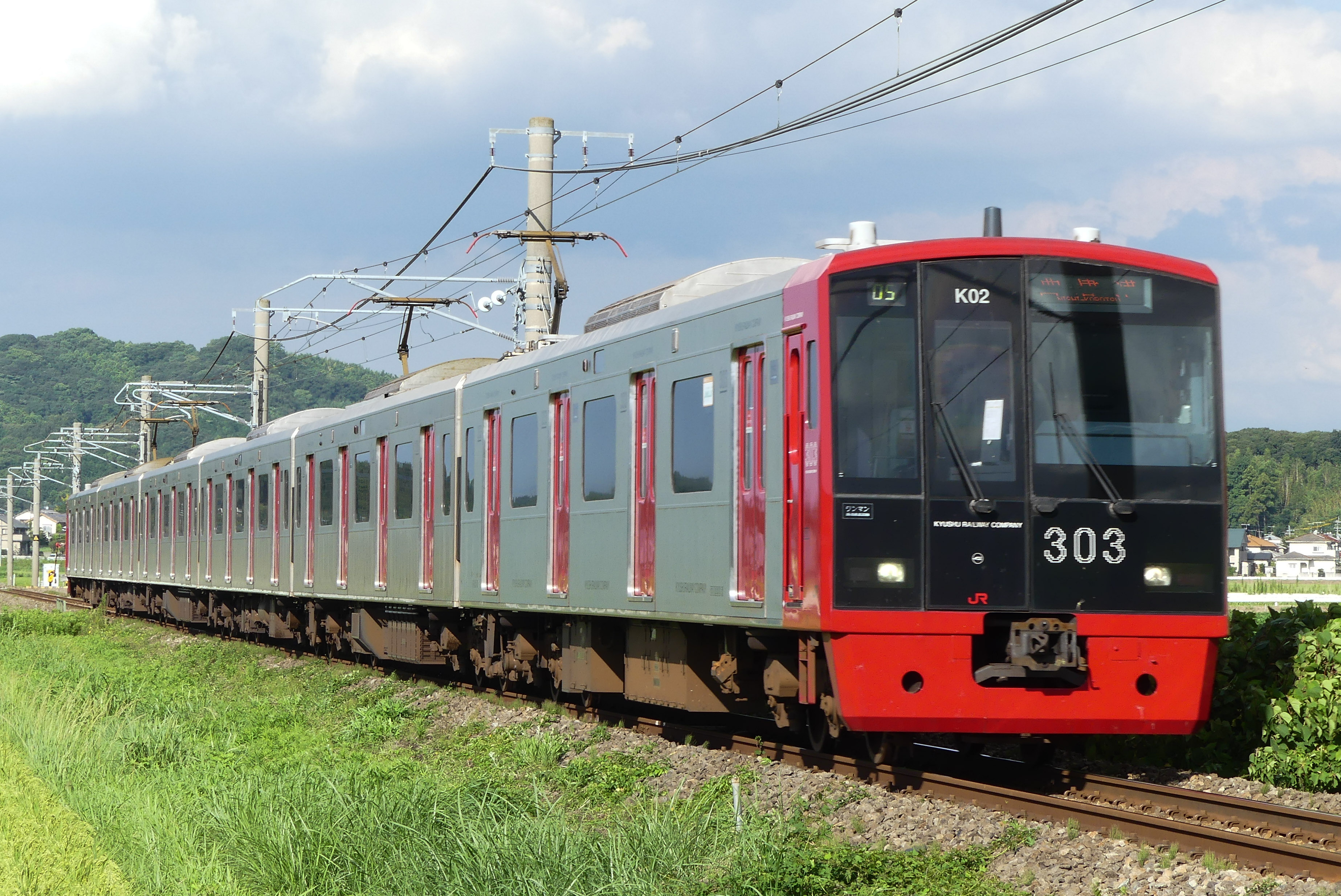
- A 303 series train in August 2017
- In service: January 2000 – present
- Manufacturer: Kinki Sharyo
- Constructed: 1999–2002
- Number built: 18 vehicles (3 sets)
- Number in service: 18 vehicles (3 sets)
- Formation: 6 cars per trainset
- Fleet numbers: K01–K03
- Operator: JR Kyushu
- Depot: Karatsu
- Lines served: Chikuhi Line, Fukuoka City Subway Airport Line

Specifications
- Car body construction: Stainless steel
- Car length: 20.25 m (66 ft 5 in) (end cars); 20 m (65 ft 7 in) (intermediate cars)
- Width: 2.8 m (9 ft 2 in)
- Height: 3.62–4.05 m (11 ft 11 in – 13 ft 3 in)
- Floor height: 1.13 m (3 ft 8 in)
- Doors: 4 pairs per side
- Maximum speed: 110 km/h (68 mph) (design); 85 km/h (53 mph) (service)
- Traction system: Hitachi or Toyo Denki IGBT–VVVF
- Traction motors: 16 × MT401K 150 kW (200 hp) 3-phase AC induction motor
- Power output: 2.4 MW (3,200 hp)
- Electric systems: 1,500 V DC Overhead catenary
- Current collection: Pantograph
- Bogies: DT405K, TR405K
- Safety systems: ATC, ATO
- Track gauge: 1,067 mm (3 ft 6 in)

The 303 series (303系) is a DC electric multiple unit (EMU) commuter train type operated by Kyushu Railway Company (JR Kyushu) on Chikuhi Line and Fukuoka City Subway Airport Line through-running services in Kyushu, Japan, since 22 January 2000.

== Design ==
The 303 series trains were designed to augment the 103-1500 series EMUs used on the Chikuhi Line, coinciding with double-tracking of the section between Shimoyamato and Chikuzen-Maebaru. The trains have lightweight stainless bodies with painted steel cab ends.

== Operations ==
The 303 series trains are used on through services between Nishi-Karatsu the Chikuhi Line and Fukuoka Airport on the Fukuoka City Subway Airport Line. They are compatible with automatic train operation (ATO) used on the Fukuoka Subway tracks, and are also equipped for wanman driver only operation.

== Formations ==
The fleet consists of three six-car sets, numbered K01 to K03 and based at Karatsu Depot. The sets are formed as shown below with four motored ("M") intermediate cars and non-powered driving trailer ("Tc") cars, with car 1 at the Nishi-Karatsu end.

Car No.	1	2	3	4	5	6
Designation	Tc	M	M'	M	M'	Tc'
Numbering	KuHa 303	MoHa 303-100	MoHa 302-0	MoHa 303-0	MoHa 302-100	KuHa 302
Weight (t)	28.4	33.6	32.4	32.4	32.7	26.4
Capacity (total/seated)	140/45	153/51	153/51	153/51	153/51	140/45

Cars 2 and 5 are each equipped with two PS402K single-arm pantographs.

== Interior ==
Passenger accommodation consists of longitudinal bench seating throughout. Car 1 has a universal access toilet.

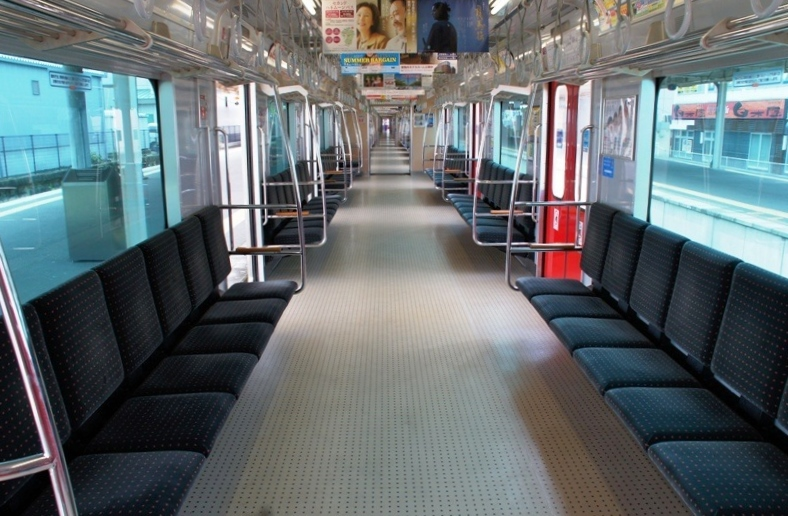
Interior view, July 2010

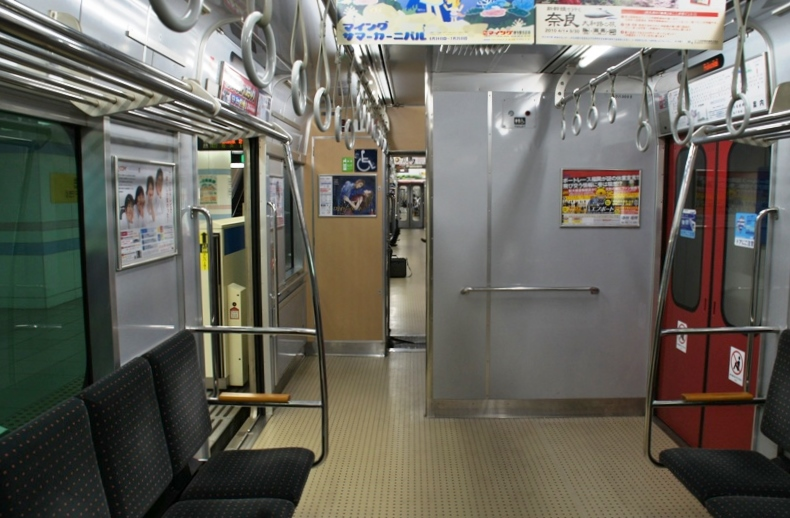
The universal-access toilet in car 1, July 2010

== History ==
The trains entered service on 22 January 2000. A toilet was retrofitted to car 1 in each set between 2003 and 2004 at JR Kyushu's Kokura Works.

== Build details ==
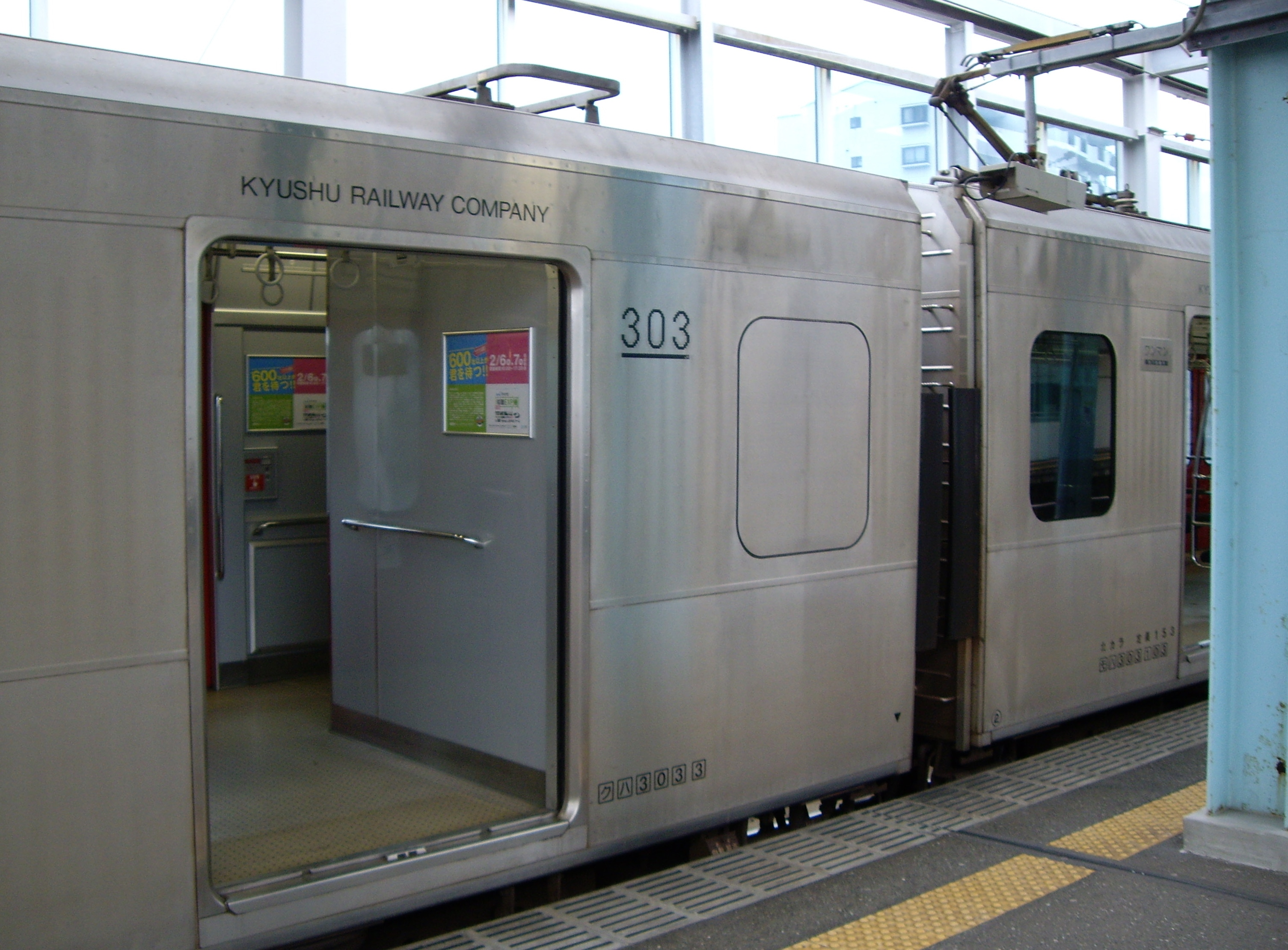
The blocked-off window at the retro-fitted toilet position in car 1

The three sets were built by Kinki Sharyo between 1999 and 2002. The fleet build details are as shown below.

Set No.	Manufacturer	Date delivered	Toilet added
K01	Kinki Sharyo	1 December 1999	21 October 2003
K02	Kinki Sharyo	4 December 1999	7 November 2003
K03	Kinki Sharyo	28 August 2002	30 January 2004
