= Airport Line (Fukuoka) =

Metro line in Fukuoka, Fukuoka prefecture, Japan

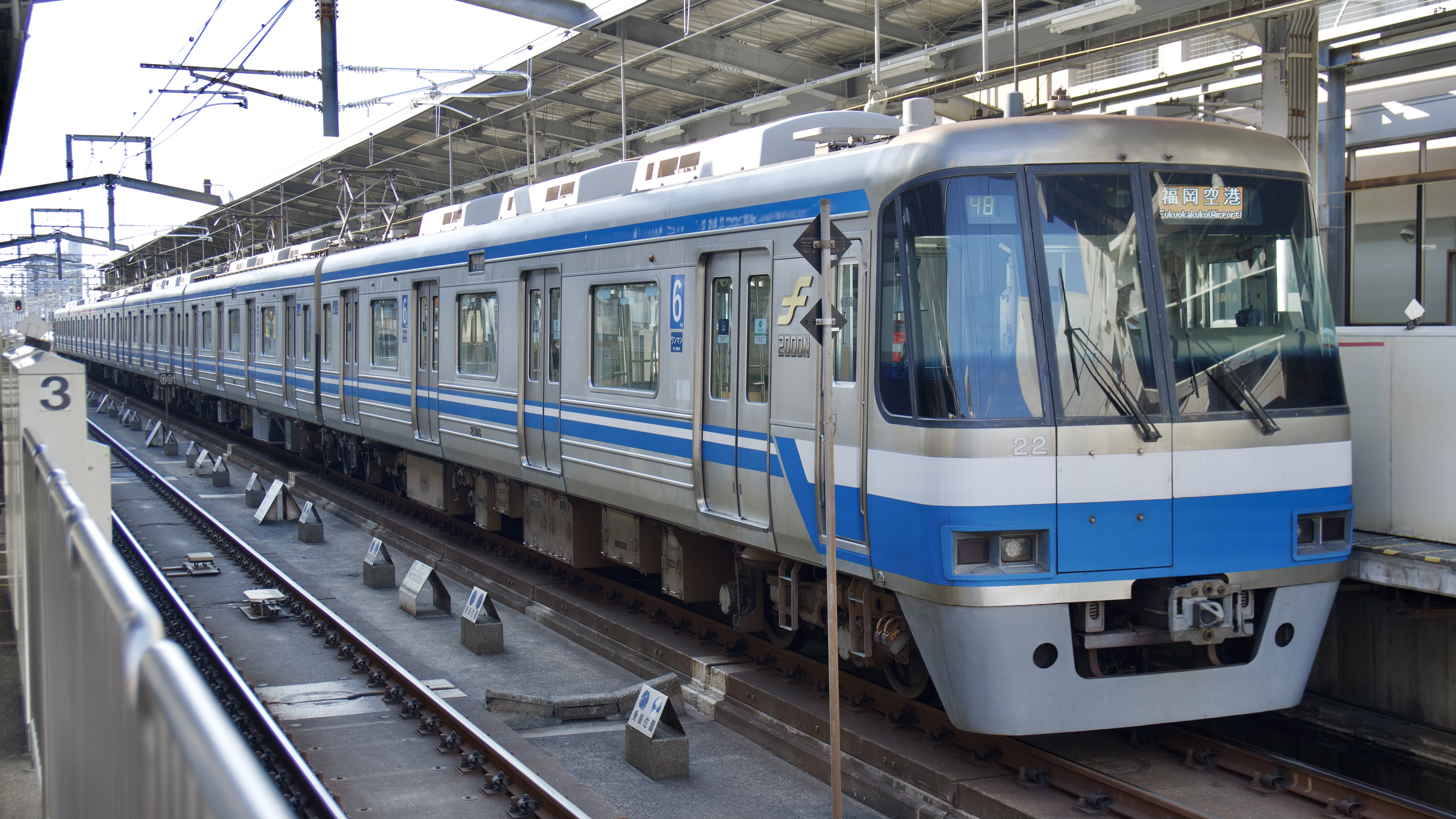
- A 2000 series train

Overview
- Native name: 空港線
- Owner: Fukuoka City Subway
- Locale: Fukuoka, Fukuoka
- Termini: Meinohama; Fukuoka Airport
- Stations: 13
- Color on map: Orange

Service
- Type: Rapid transit
- System: Fukuoka City Subway
- Depot(s): Meinohama
- Rolling stock: Fukuoka Subway 1000 series Fukuoka Subway 2000 series Fukuoka Subway 4000 series

History
- Opened: 26 July 1981; 44 years ago
- Last extension: 1993

Technical
- Line length: 13.1 km (8.1 mi)
- Track gauge: 1,067 mm (3 ft 6 in)
- Electrification: Overhead line, 1,500 V DC
- Operating speed: 75 km/h (47 mph)

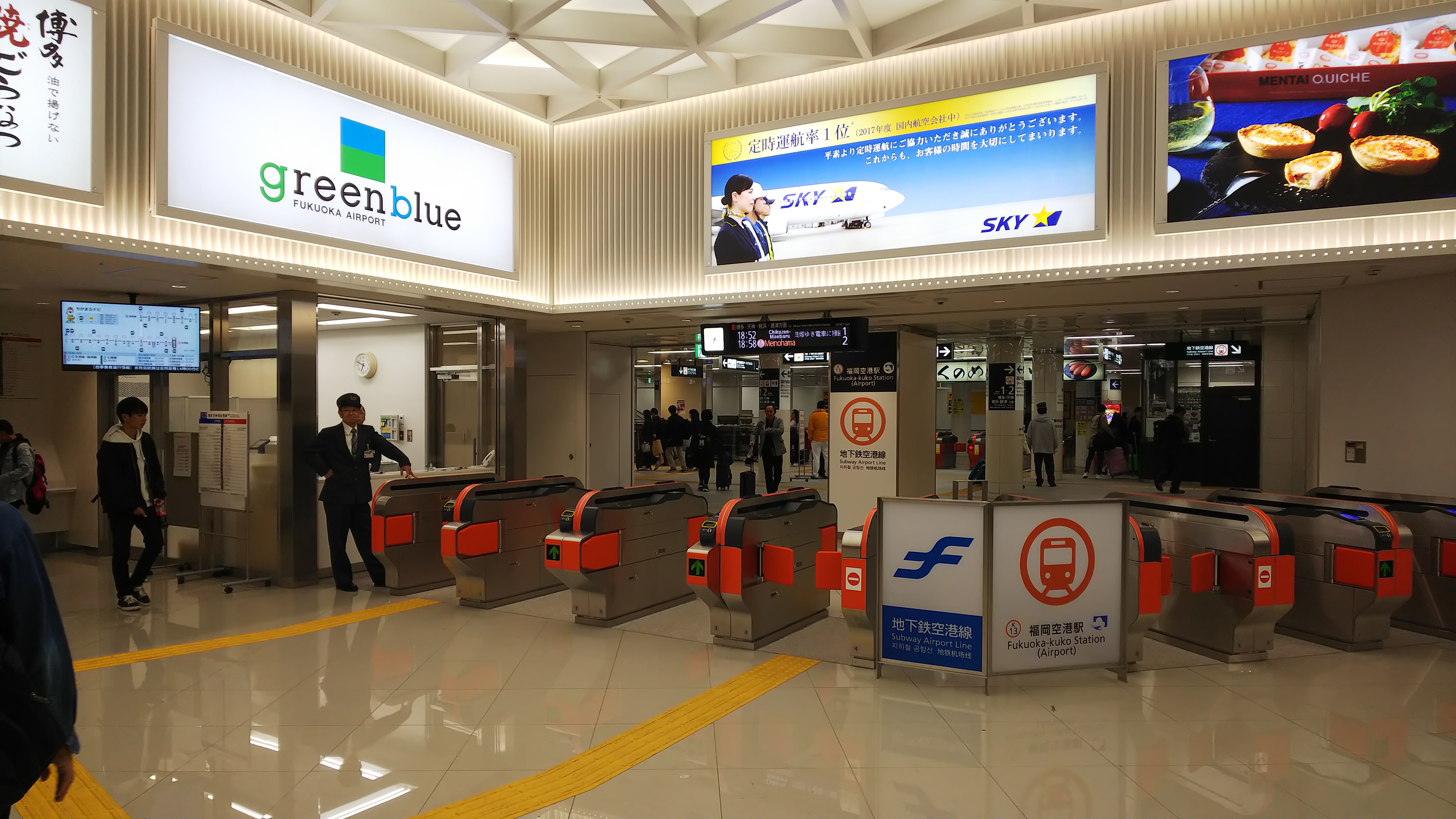
Fukuokakūkō (Airport) Station

The Airport Line (空港線, Kūkō-sen) is a subway line, part of the Fukuoka City Subway system in Fukuoka, Japan. It connects Meinohama, Nishi Ward to Fukuoka Airport, Hakata Ward, all within Fukuoka. The line's color on maps is orange. Officially, the line is called Line 1 (Airport Line) (1号線(空港線), Ichi-gō-sen (Kūkō-sen)). The line has a through service with the JR Chikuhi Line. Like other Fukuoka City Subway lines, stations are equipped with automatic platform gates, and trains are automatically operated by an ATO system. However, JR train cars (from Chikuhi Line) are operated manually.

This is the only subway line in the country that directly links to an airport. Although Toei Asakusa Line trains in Tokyo also serve airports (Narita and Haneda), those are not the stations of the Asakusa Line itself. Rather, they are the stations of suburban lines that the Asakusa Line has through services with.

The Airport Line goes through many important areas of the city, namely Nishijin, Tenjin, Hakata, and the airport.

== Station list ==
All stations are in Fukuoka, Fukuoka Prefecture.

No.	Station name	Distance (km)		Transfers	Location
No.	Station name	Between stations	Total	Transfers	Location
↑ Some through services to/from Nishi-Karatsu via the Chikuhi Line and the Karatsu Line ↑
K01	Meinohama	—N/a	0	Chikuhi Line (JK01, through service)	Nishi
K02	Muromi	1.5	1.5		Sawara
K03	Fujisaki	0.8	2.3		Sawara
K04	Nishijin	1.1	3.4		Sawara
K05	Tōjinmachi	1.2	4.6		Chūō
K06	Ōhorikōen	0.8	5.4		Chūō
K07	Akasaka	1.1	6.5		Chūō
K08	Tenjin	0.8	7.3	Nanakuma Line (N16: Tenjin-minami); Tenjin Ōmuta Line (Nishitetsu Fukuoka)	Chūō
K09	Nakasu-Kawabata	0.8	8.1	Hakozaki Line (H01, through service)	Hakata
↓ Some through services to/from Kaizuka via the Hakozaki Line ↓
K10	Gion	1.0	9.1		Hakata
K11	Hakata	0.7	9.8	San'yō Shinkansen; Hakataminami Line; Kyūshū Shinkansen; Relay Kamome (Nishi Kyushu Shinkansen connection); JA JB Kagoshima Main Line (JA00/JB00); JC Fukuhoku Yutaka Line (JC00); Nanakuma Line (N18)	Hakata
K12	Higashi-Hie	1.2	11.0		Hakata
K13	Fukuoka Airport	2.1	13.1	✈ Fukuoka Airport	Hakata

Through services to/from the Hakozaki Line do not continue onto the Chikuhi Line (and vice versa); they terminate at Meinohama Station instead.

== Rolling stock ==
=== Fukuoka City Subway ===
- 1000 series (since 1981)
- 2000 series (since 1992)
- 4000 series (since 2024)
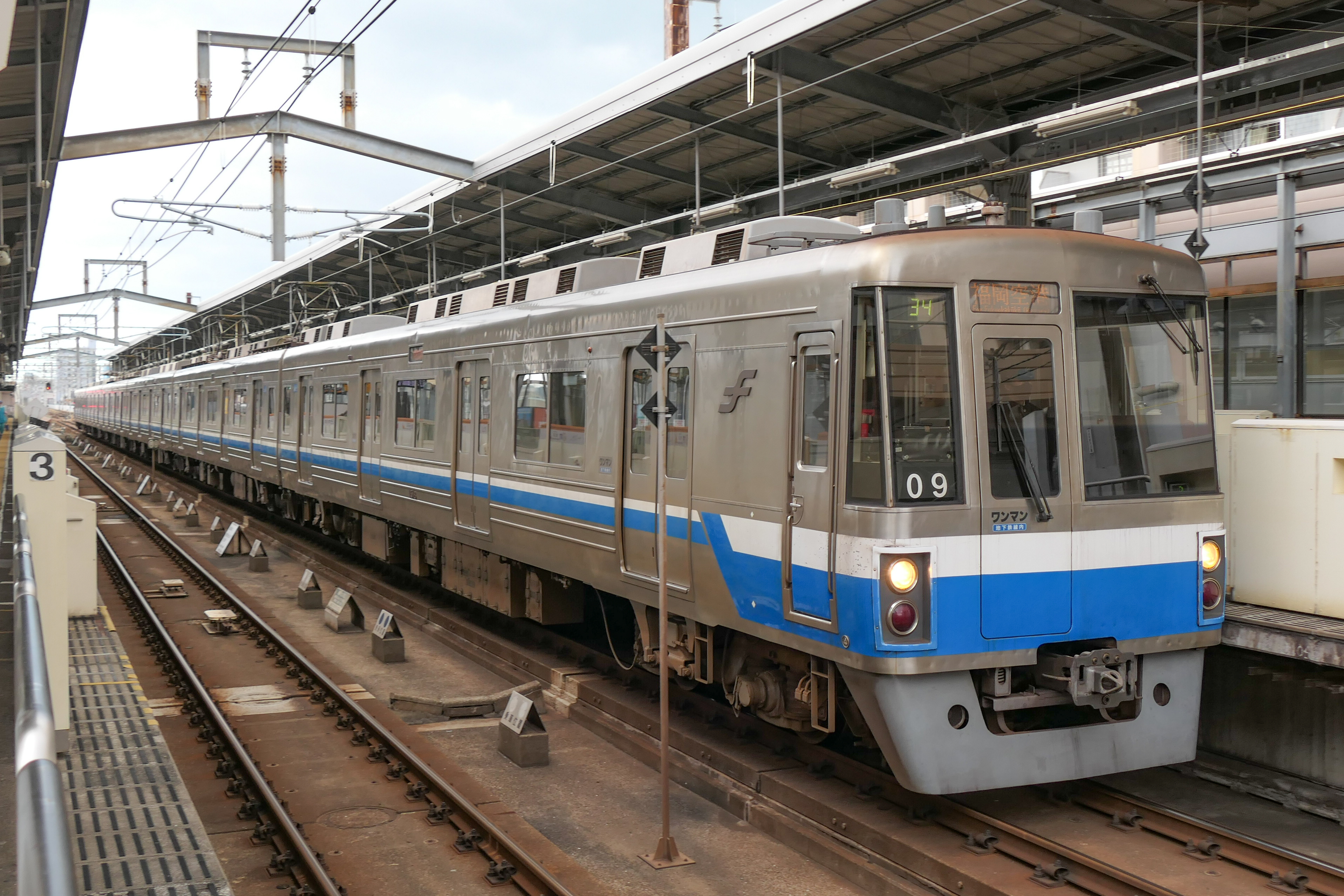
A 1000 series set in December 2021

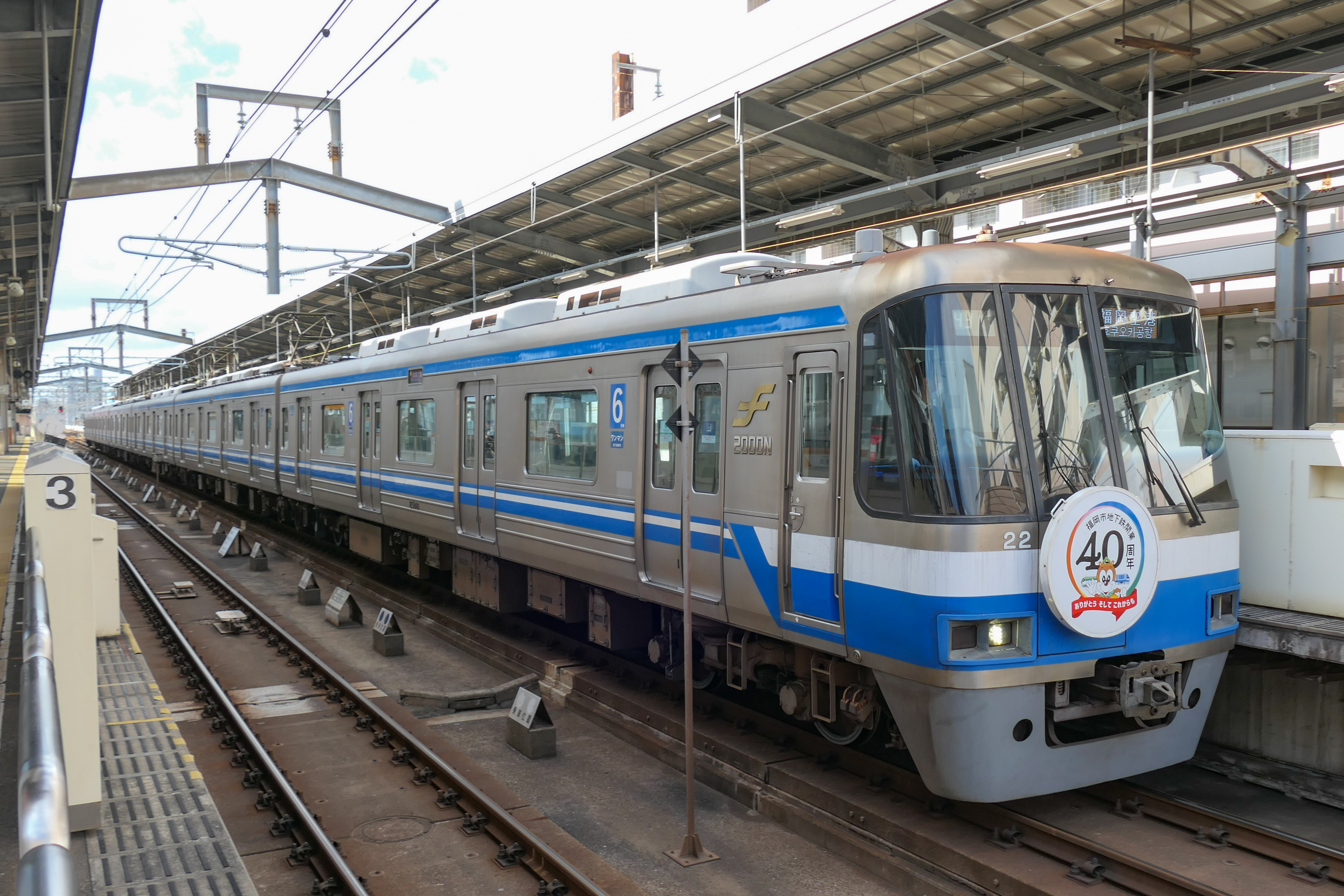
A 2000 series set in December 2021

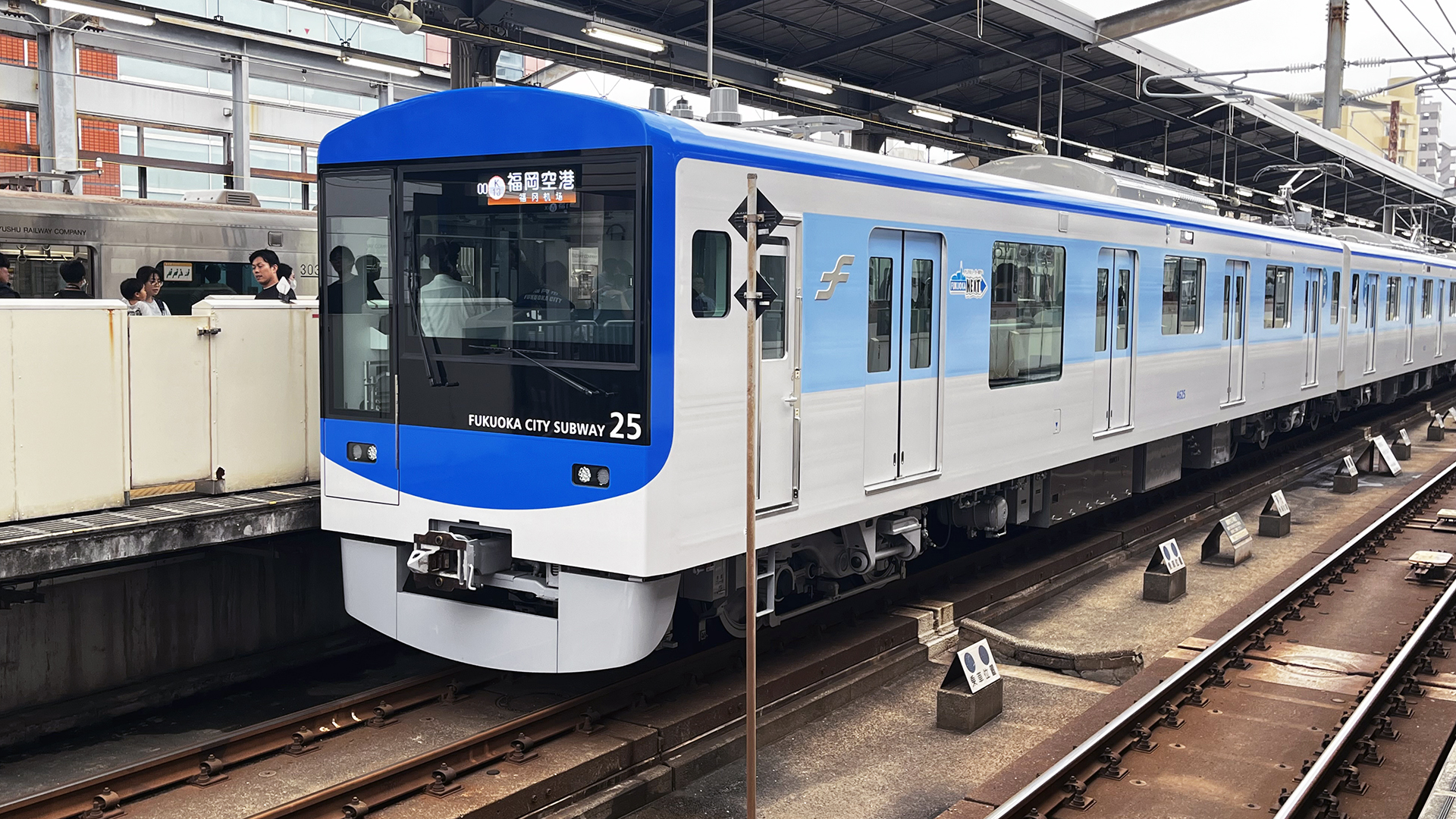
A 4000 series set in October 2024

=== JR Kyushu ===
==== Current ====
- 303 series 6-car EMUs (3 trainsets) (since 2000)
- 305 series 6-car EMUs (6 trainsets) (since 2015)

==== Former ====
- 103-1500 series 6-car EMUs (9 trainsets) (since 1982). No longer operate on Fukuoka City Subway Kuko Line. They remain in service as 3-car sets on the Chikuhi Line between Chikuzen-Maebaru and Karatsu/Nishi-Karatsu.
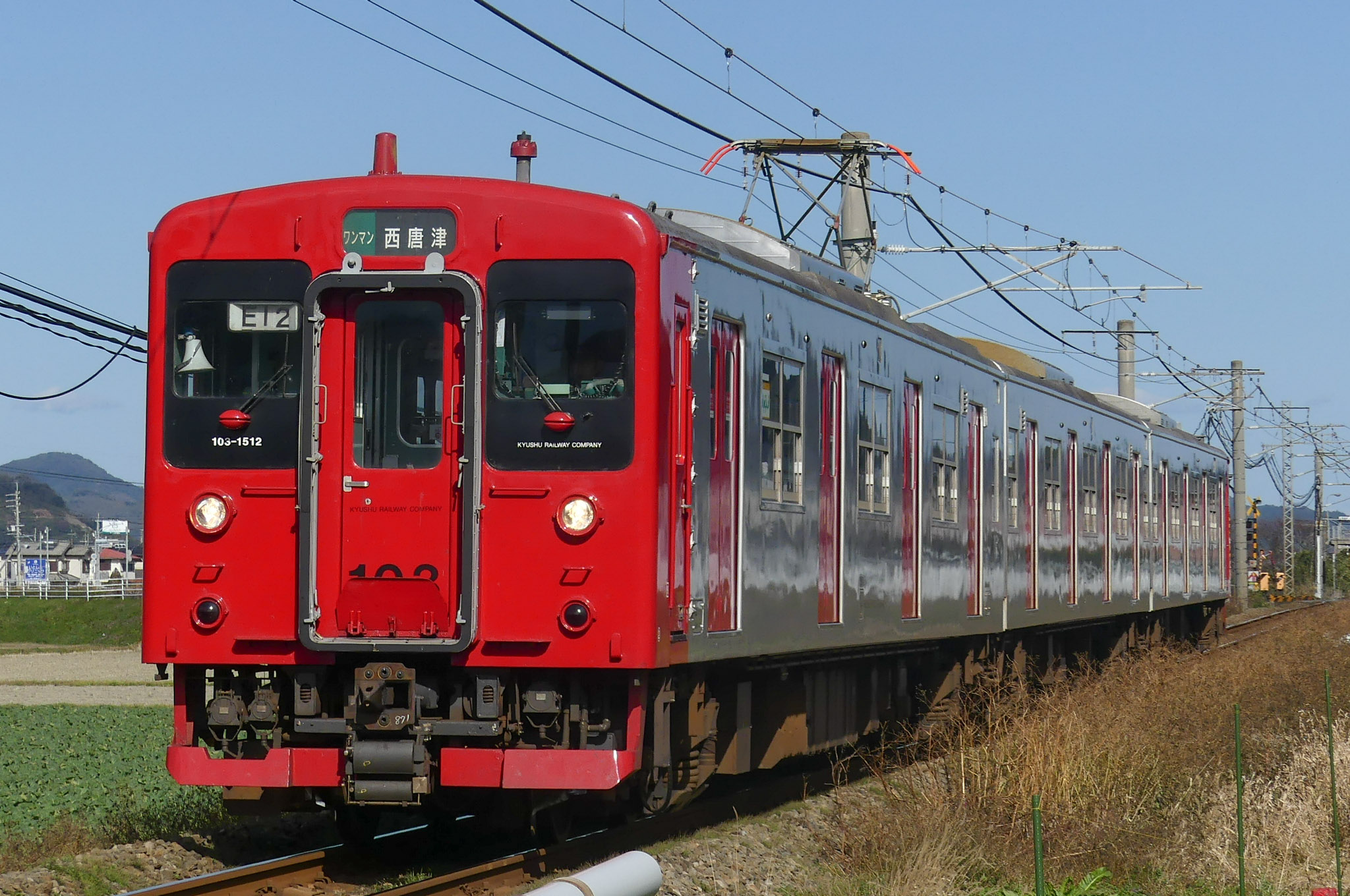
A 103-1500 series set in January 2019

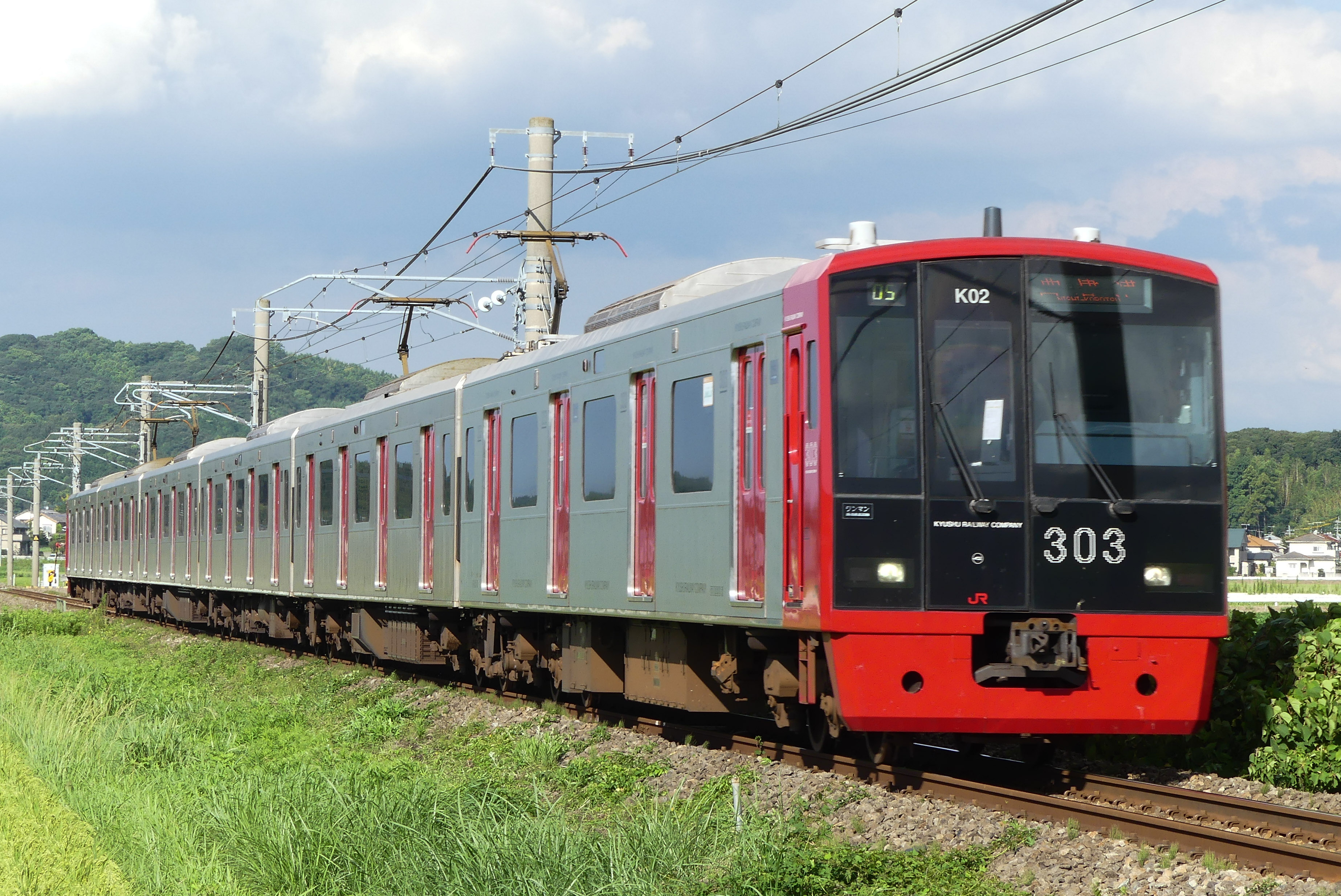
A 303 series set in August 2017

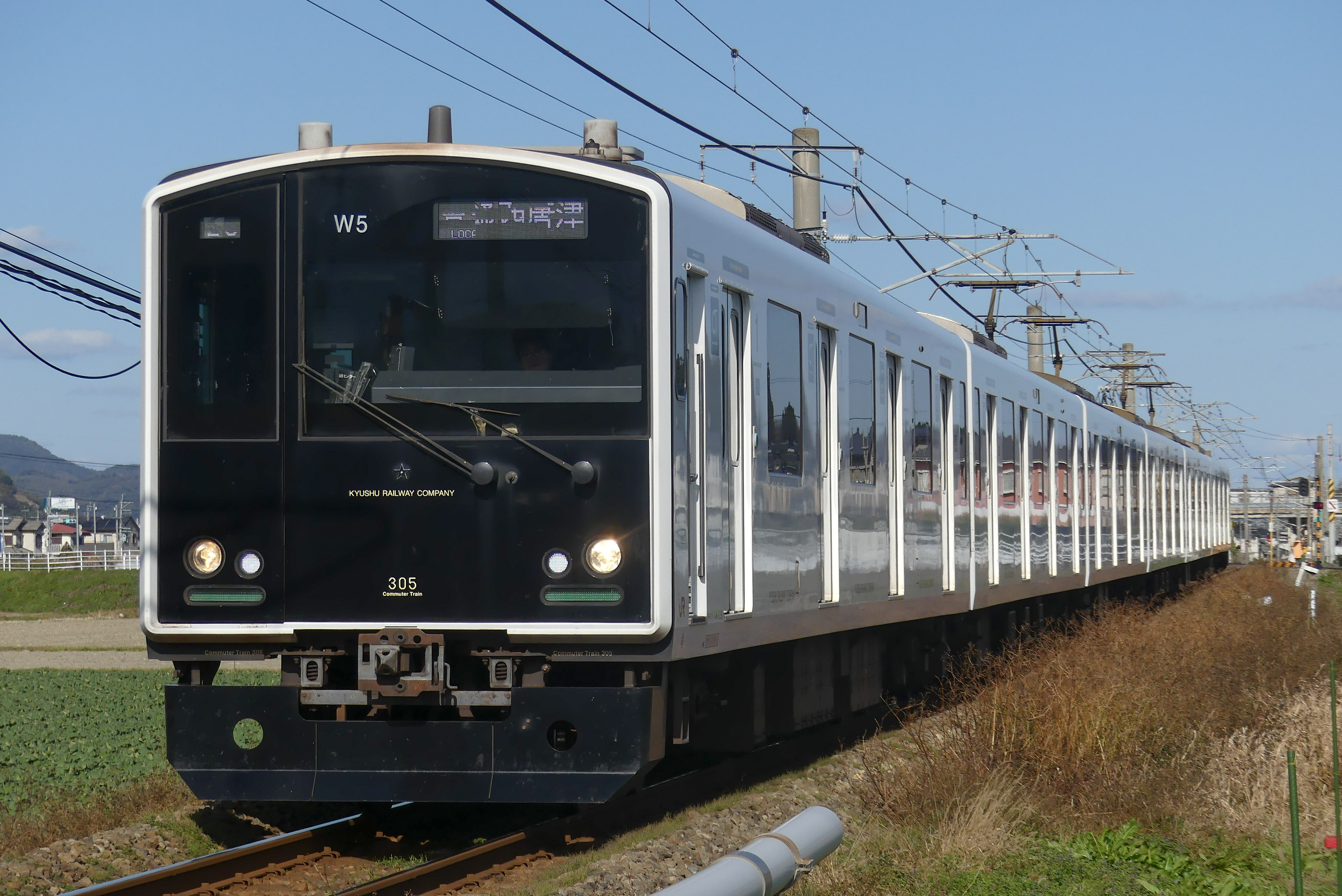
A 305 series set in January 2019

== See also ==
- Airport rail link
- List of railway lines in Japan
