= Tenjin Station =

Metro station in Fukuoka, Japan

Coordinates: 33.5913747°N 130.3992458°E

K08 Tenjin Station 天神駅
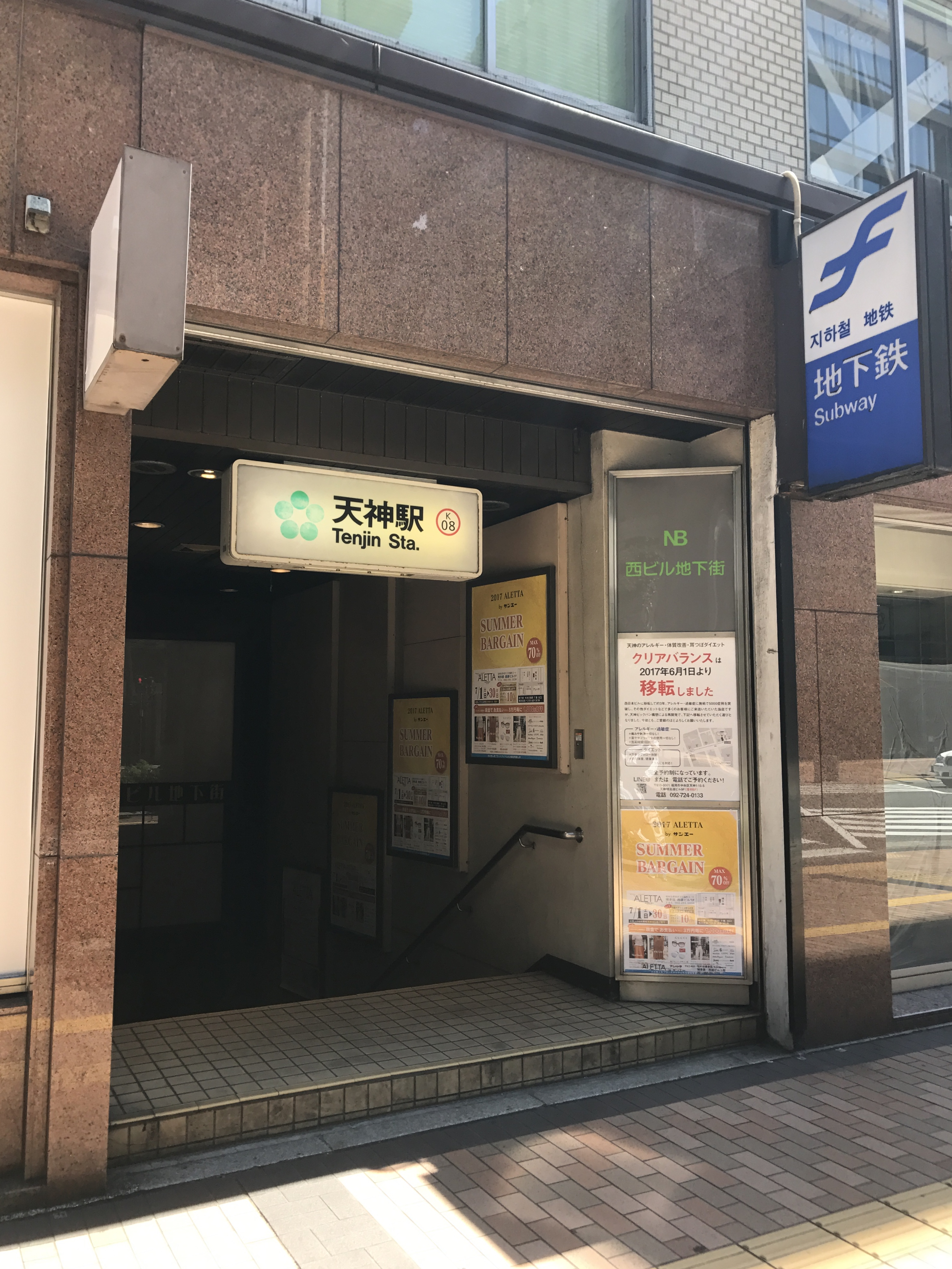
- Entrance No.12

General information
- Location: 1-chōme Tenjin, Chūō, Fukuoka, Fukuoka （福岡市中央区天神1丁目） Japan
- System: Fukuoka City Subway station
- Operator: Fukuoka City Subway
- Line: Airport Line

Other information
- Station code: K08

History
- Opened: 26 July 1981; 45 years ago

Services
Preceding station	Fukuoka City Subway	Following station
Akasaka K07 towards Meinohama	Airport Line	Nakasu-Kawabata K09 towards Fukuoka Airport
Location
- Location within Fukuoka city

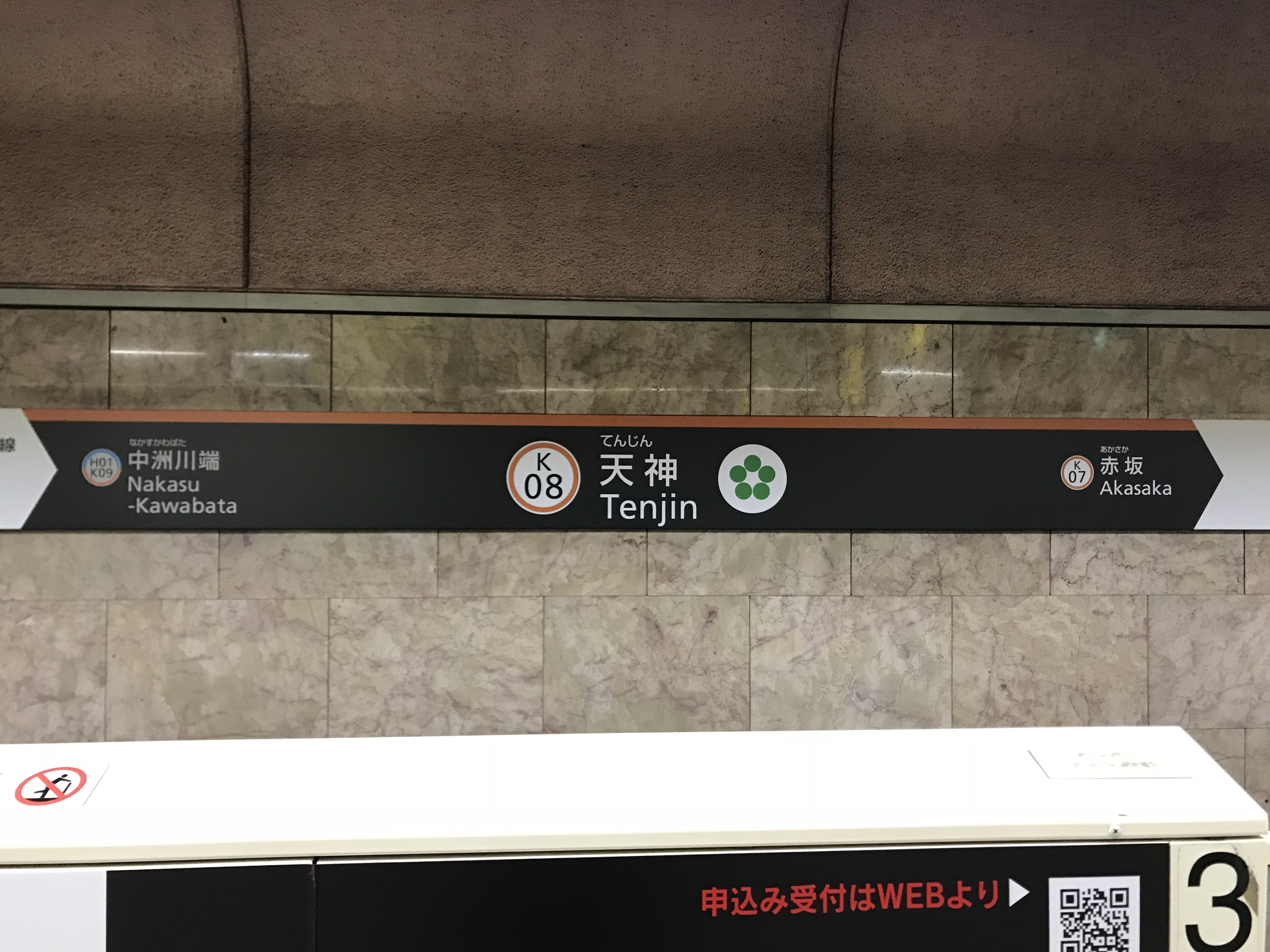
Station sign

Tenjin Station (天神駅, Tenjin-eki) is a subway station located in Chūō-ku, Fukuoka, Japan. Its station symbol is 5 green dots arranged in a circle, representing a plum blossom, it is Tenmangū (a.k.a.Tenjin)'s symbol. The station is located directly under Meiji-Street (明治通り, Meiji-dōri) in Tenjin, Fukuoka. A large underground shopping mall reaches from Tenjin Station on the Airport Line to the Tenjin-Minami Station (天神南駅, Tenjin-Minami-eki) on the Nanakuma Line.

== Lines ==
- Fukuoka City Subway
  - Airport Line

== Platforms ==
1	■ Airport Line	for Hakata, Fukuoka Airport and Kaizuka
2	■ Airport Line	for Nishijin, Meinohama, Chikuzen-Maebaru and Karatsu

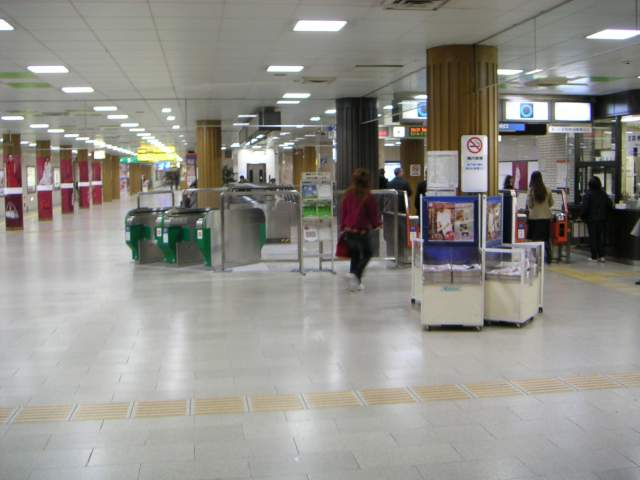
Concourse

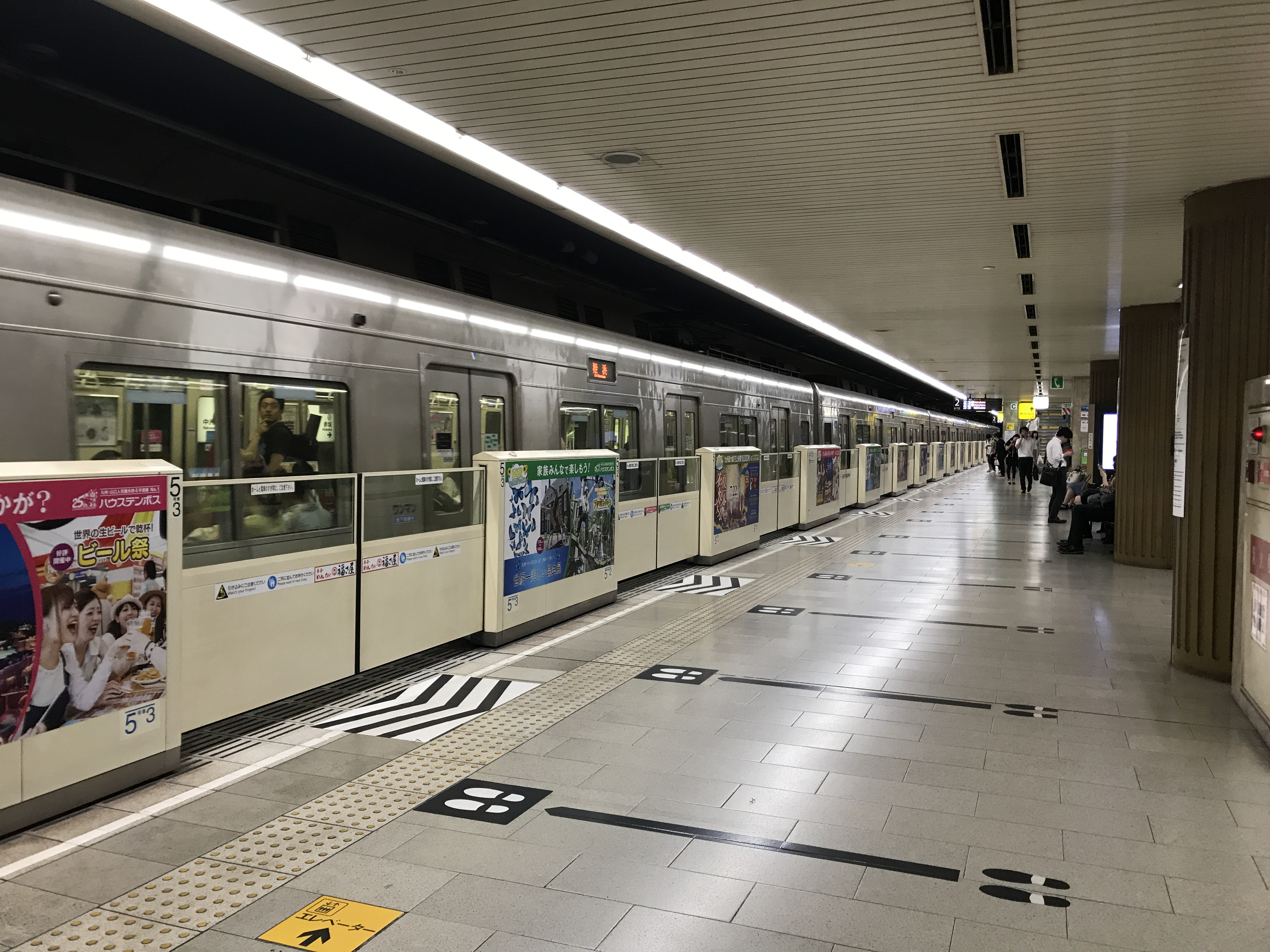
Platform

== Usage ==
In 2006, the daily average number of passengers was 63,166. It is the largest subway station on the Airport Line.

== History ==
- July 26, 1981 - opening of Tenjin Station

== Transfer ==
The underground shopping mall can be used for transfer between the Airport Line and the Nanakuma Line. To use the same ticket for both lines, passengers must exit through a special gate and enter the gate of the second line within two hours. Therefore, it is no problem to use the transfer time for shopping. If the regular gate is used, a new ticket is required to be purchased. Special tickets can be used for the transfer.
