= Fukuoka Airport Station =

Metro station in Fukuoka, Japan

K13 Fukuoka Airport Station 福岡空港駅
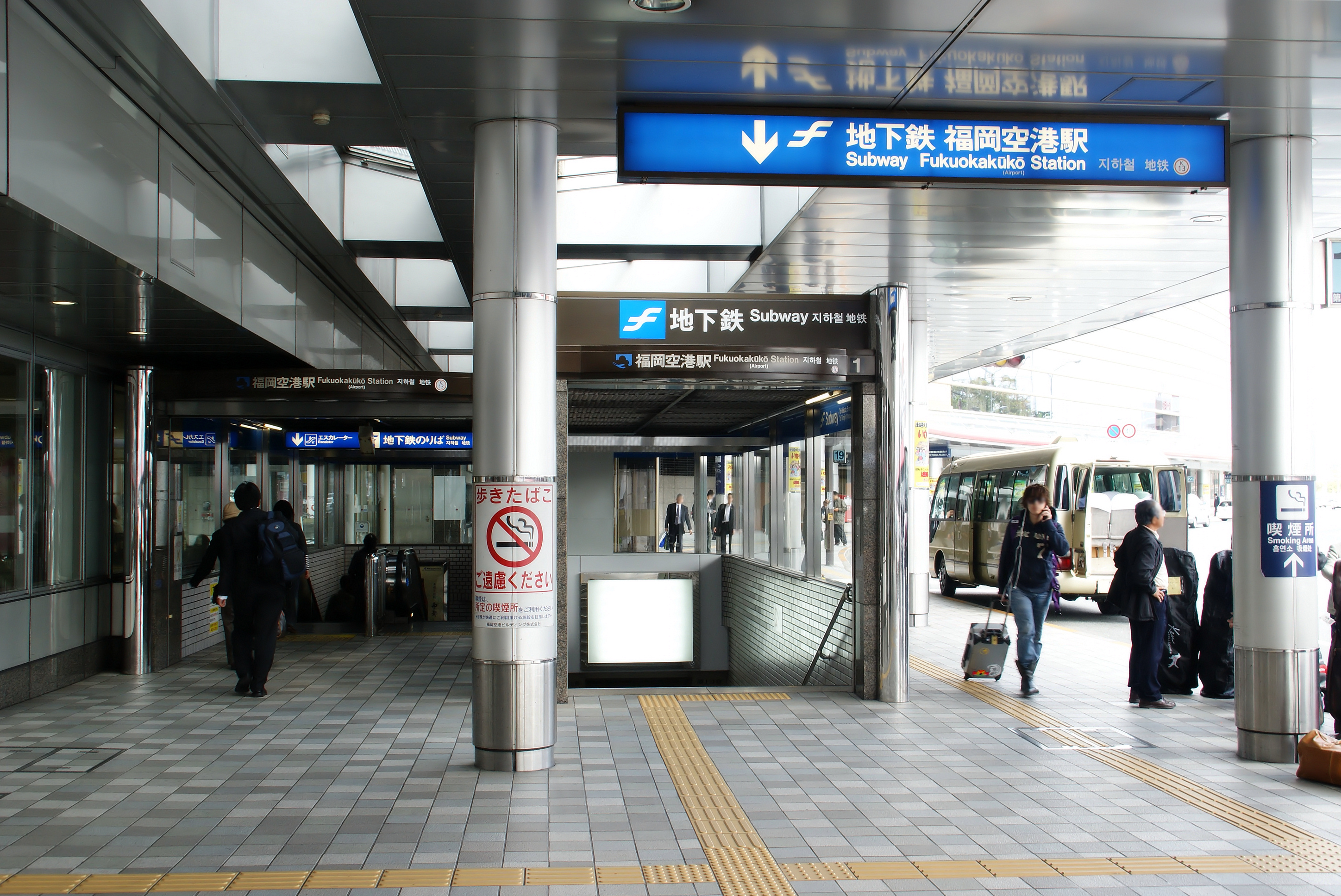
- Entrance No.1

General information
- Location: Shimousui, Hakata Ward, Fukuoka City, Fukuoka Prefecture; Japan
- Coordinates: 33.5973°N 130.4482°E
- System: Fukuoka City Subway station
- Operator: Fukuoka City Subway
- Line: Airport Line
- Platforms: 1 island platform
- Tracks: 2
- Connections: Bus terminal; Fukuoka Airport

Construction
- Structure type: Underground

Other information
- Station code: K13
- IATA code: FUK

History
- Opened: 3 March 1993; 33 years ago

Passengers
- 2007: 20,053 daily

Services
Preceding station	Fukuoka City Subway	Following station
Higashi-Hie K12 towards Meinohama	Airport Line	Terminus
Location
- Location within Fukuoka city Location within Japan

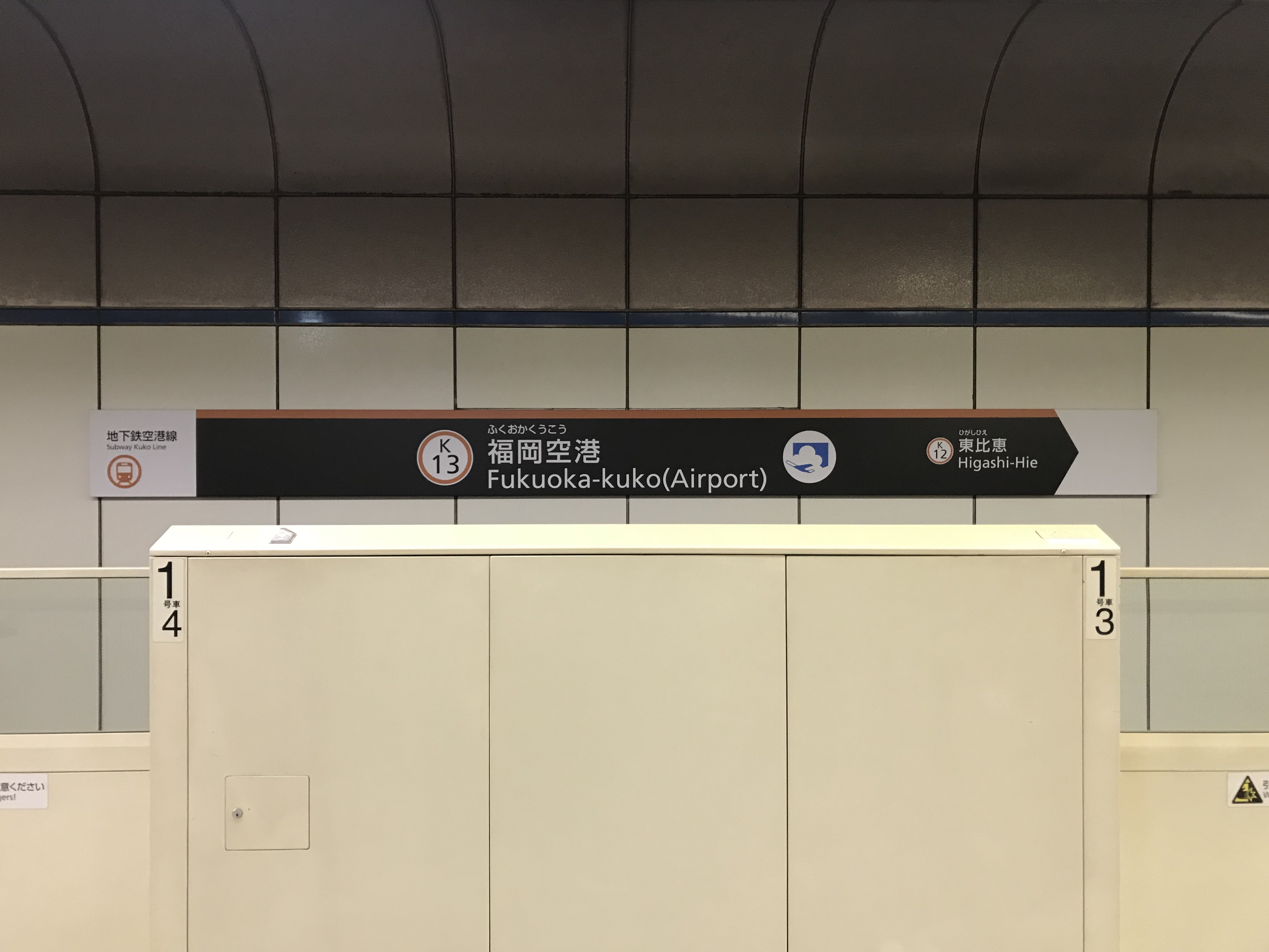
Station sign (designed by Isao Nisijima)

Fukuoka Airport Station (福岡空港駅, Fukuokakūkō-eki) is a Fukuoka City Subway station serving the domestic terminal of Fukuoka Airport in Fukuoka prefecture, Japan. The station symbol is a blue airplane and a cloud. This is the only subway station in Japan which directly connects with an airport.

== History ==
The station opened on 3 March 1993.

== Lines ==
The station is served by the Fukuoka City Subway Airport Line.

== Station layout ==
The platforms are located on the 2nd basement level.

1	■ Airport Line	for Hakata, Tenjin, Meinohama, Chikuzen-Maebaru and Karatsu
2	■ Airport Line	for Hakata, Tenjin, Meinohama, Chikuzen-Maebaru and Karatsu

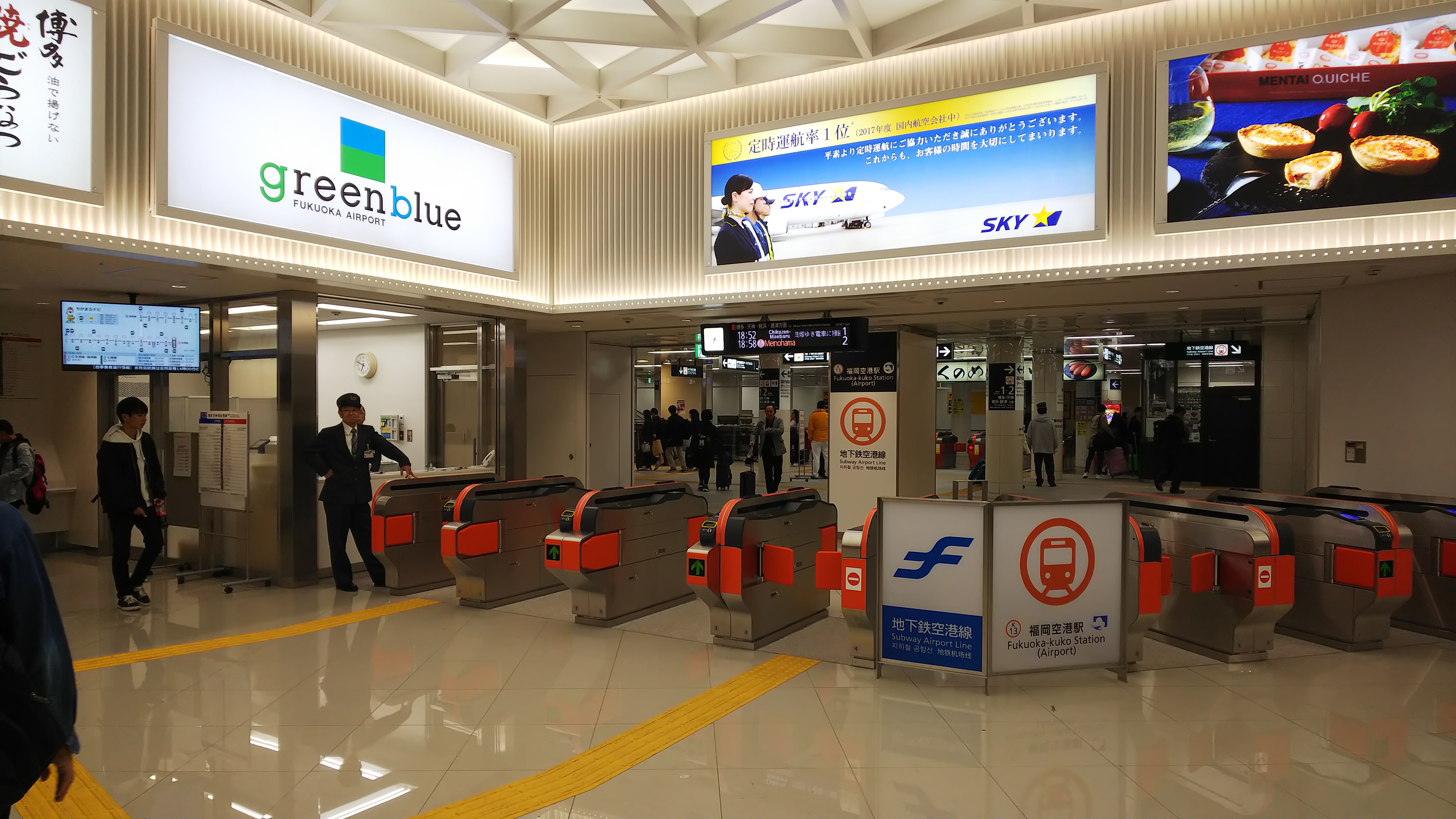
Ticket gates

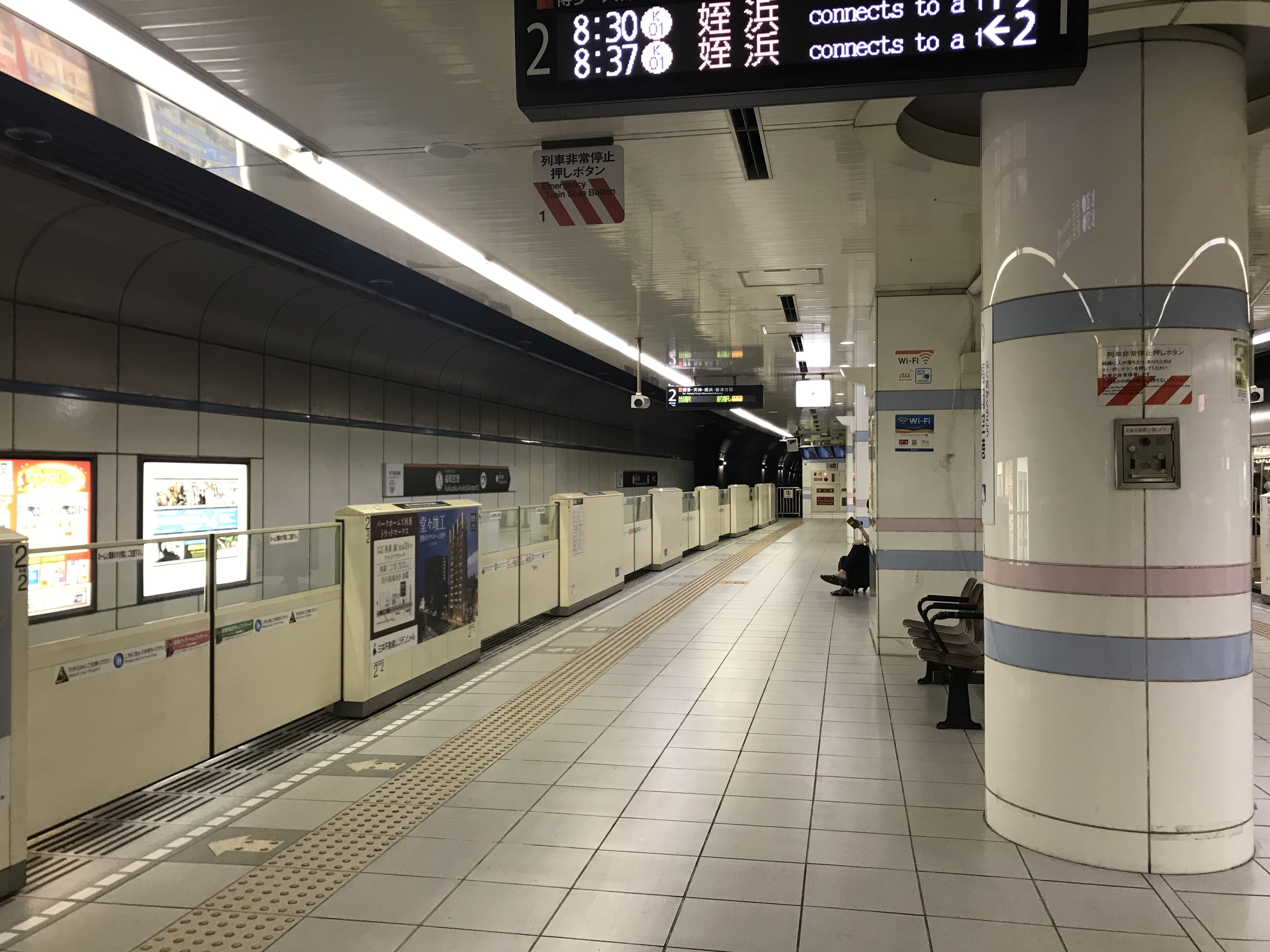
Platform

== Vicinity ==
- Fukuoka Airport
  - Terminal 1, 2, 3 and International Terminal (via shuttle bus)
  - Fukuoka Airport Police Station
  - Fukuokakūkōnai Post Office
- Bus terminal (with. Airport Express bus)
- Higashihirao Park: Level-5 stadium
