= Ropponmatsu Station =

Metro station in Fukuoka, Japan

Coordinates: 33.5777°N 130.3771°E

N11 Ropponmatsu Station 六本松駅
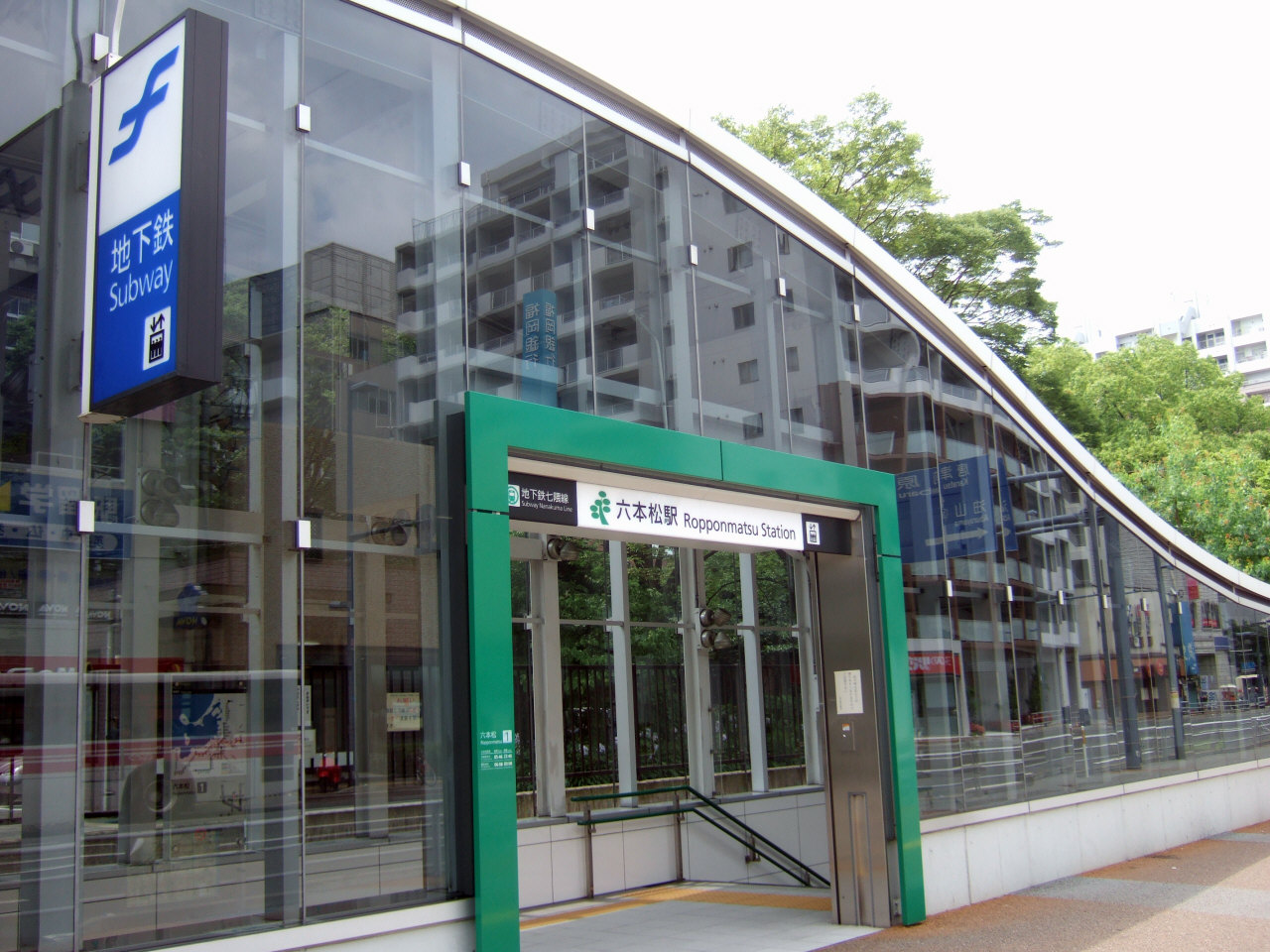

General information
- Location: Chūō, Fukuoka, Fukuoka; Japan
- System: Fukuoka City Subway station
- Operator: Fukuoka City Subway
- Line: Nanakuma Line

Other information
- Station code: N11

History
- Opened: February 3, 2005; 21 years ago

Passengers
- 2006: 2,323 daily

Services
Preceding station	Fukuoka City Subway	Following station
Befu N10 towards Hashimoto	Nanakuma Line	Sakurazaka N12 towards Hakata
Location

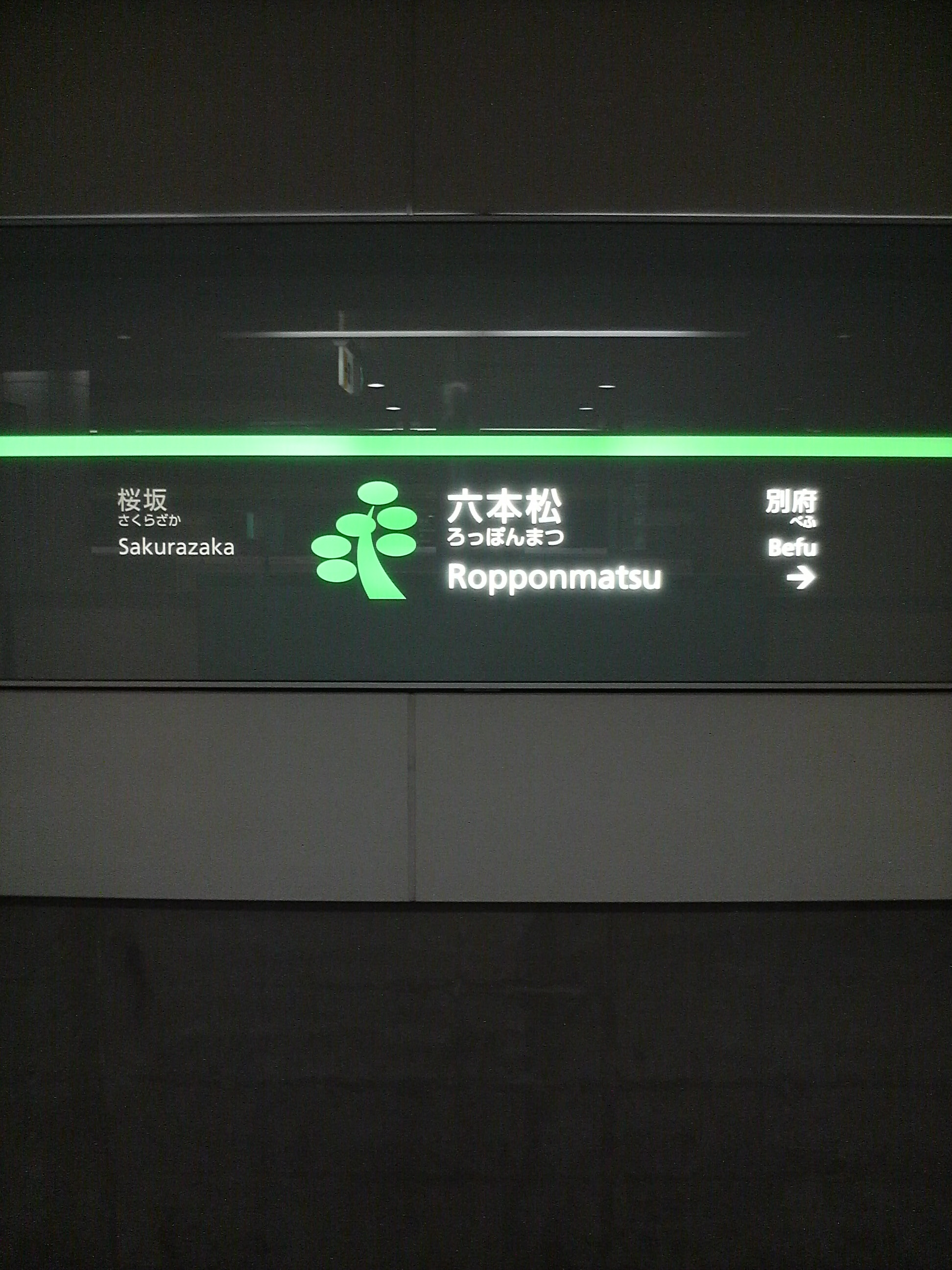
Station symbol

Ropponmatsu Station (六本松駅) is a subway station on the Fukuoka City Subway Nanakuma Line in Chūō-ku, Fukuoka in Japan. Its station symbol is a picture of a pine tree with six branches in green, since "Ropponmatsu" literally means "six pines" in Japanese.

== Lines ==
- Fukuoka City Subway
  - Nanakuma Line

== Platforms ==
1	■ Nanakuma Line	for Hakata
2	■ Nanakuma Line	for Hashimoto

== Vicinity ==
- Route 202
- McDonald's
- Subway
- Seattle's Best Coffee
- Befu Bridge (Hii River)
- Kyushu University Ropponmatsu Campus
- Nishitetsu bus stop
- Lawson
- Nishi-Nippon City Bank Ropponmatsu branch office
- Fukuoka Prefecture Gokoku Shrine
- NHK Fukuoka broadcasting station
- Fukuoka Meteorological Observatory
- Ōhori Park
- Ōhori Junior High School and High School Attached to Fukuoka University
- Ropponmatsu 421, Fukuoka City Science Museum

== History ==
- February 3, 2005: Ropponmatsu Station opens.
