= Yakuin-ōdōri Station =

Metro station in Fukuoka, Japan

Coordinates: 33.5803°N 130.3959°E

N13 Yakuin-ōdōri Station 薬院大通駅
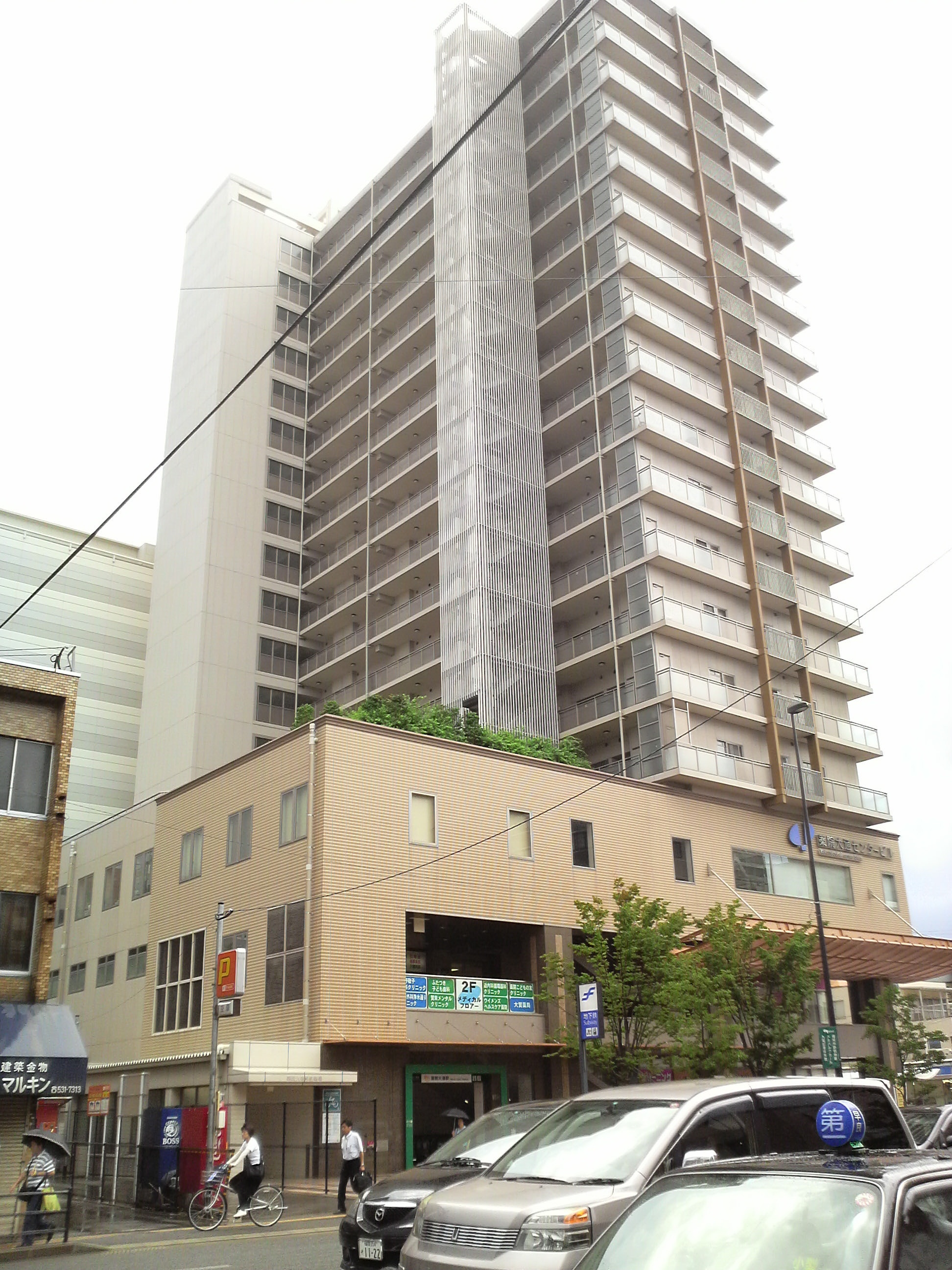

General information
- Location: 4-chōme Yakuin, Chūō, Fukuoka, Fukuoka （福岡市中央区薬院4丁目） Japan
- System: Fukuoka City Subway station
- Operator: Fukuoka City Subway
- Line: Nanakuma Line

Other information
- Station code: N13

History
- Opened: 3 February 2005; 21 years ago

Services
Preceding station	Fukuoka City Subway	Following station
Sakurazaka N12 towards Hashimoto	Nanakuma Line	Yakuin N14 towards Hakata
Location

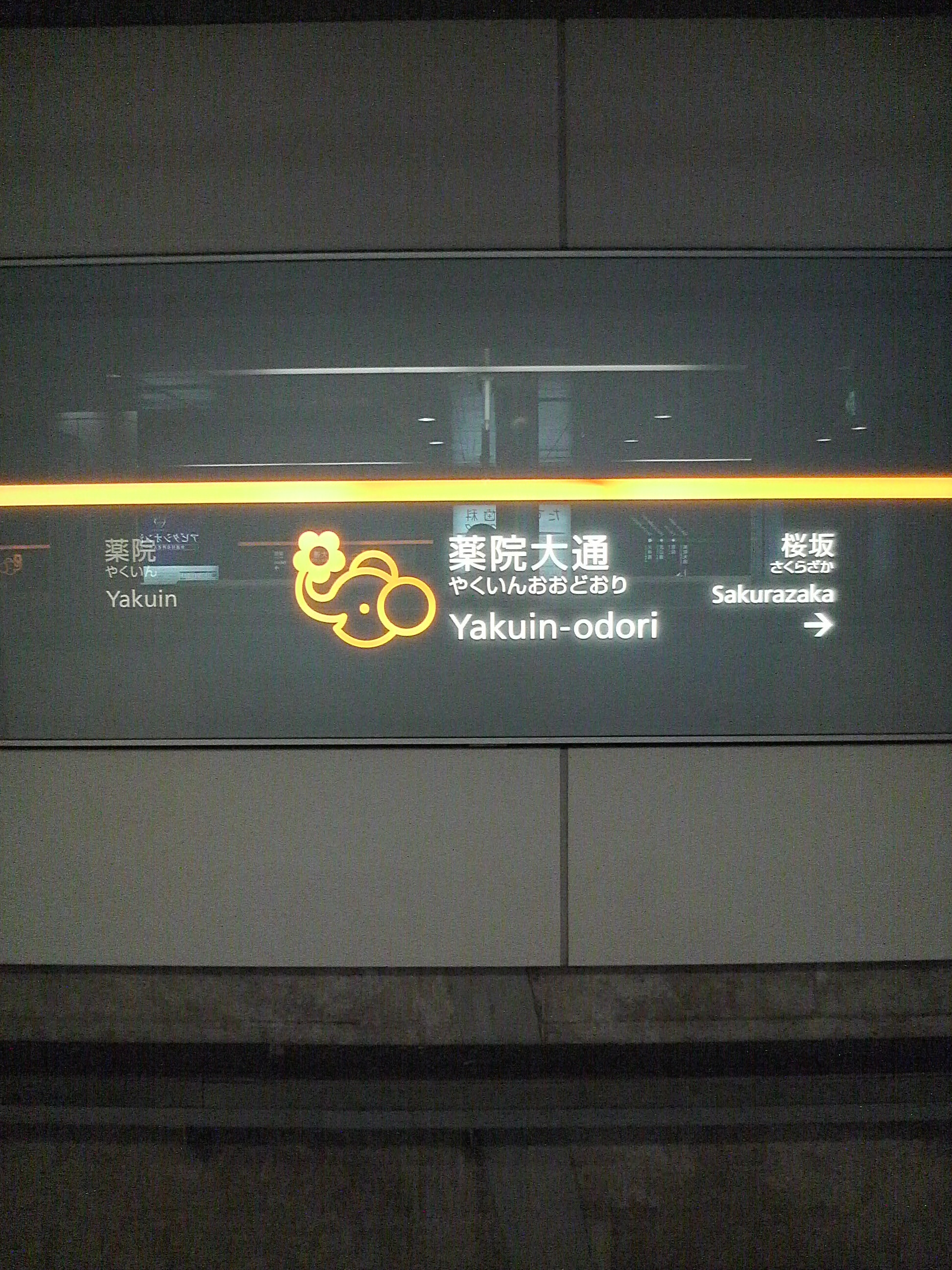
Running in board

Yakuin-ōdōri Station (薬院大通駅, Yakuin-ōdōri-eki) is a subway station located in Chūō-ku, Fukuoka. This station's symbol mark is a flower and an elephant's head in yellow due to its location near the Zoo and Botanical Garden.

== Lines ==
- Fukuoka City Subway
  - Nanakuma Line

== Platforms ==
1	■ Nanakuma Line	for Hakata
2	■ Nanakuma Line	for Hashimoto

== Vicinity ==
- Minami Kōen (South Park)
  - Fukuoka Municipal Zoo and Botanical Garden
  - Sun Yat-Sen memorial
  - West lookout
- Fukuoka Teishin Hospital
- Kyushu Energy Science museum
- Kyushu Electric Power Memorial Gymnasium
- Fukuoka Chūō High School
- Fukuoka Futaba Junior and Senior High School
- Bank of Fukuoka Yakuin branch office
- Fukuoka Central Fire Station
