= Sakurazaka Station =

Metro station in Fukuoka, Japan

Coordinates: 33.5770°N 130.3871°E

N12 Sakurazaka Station 桜坂駅
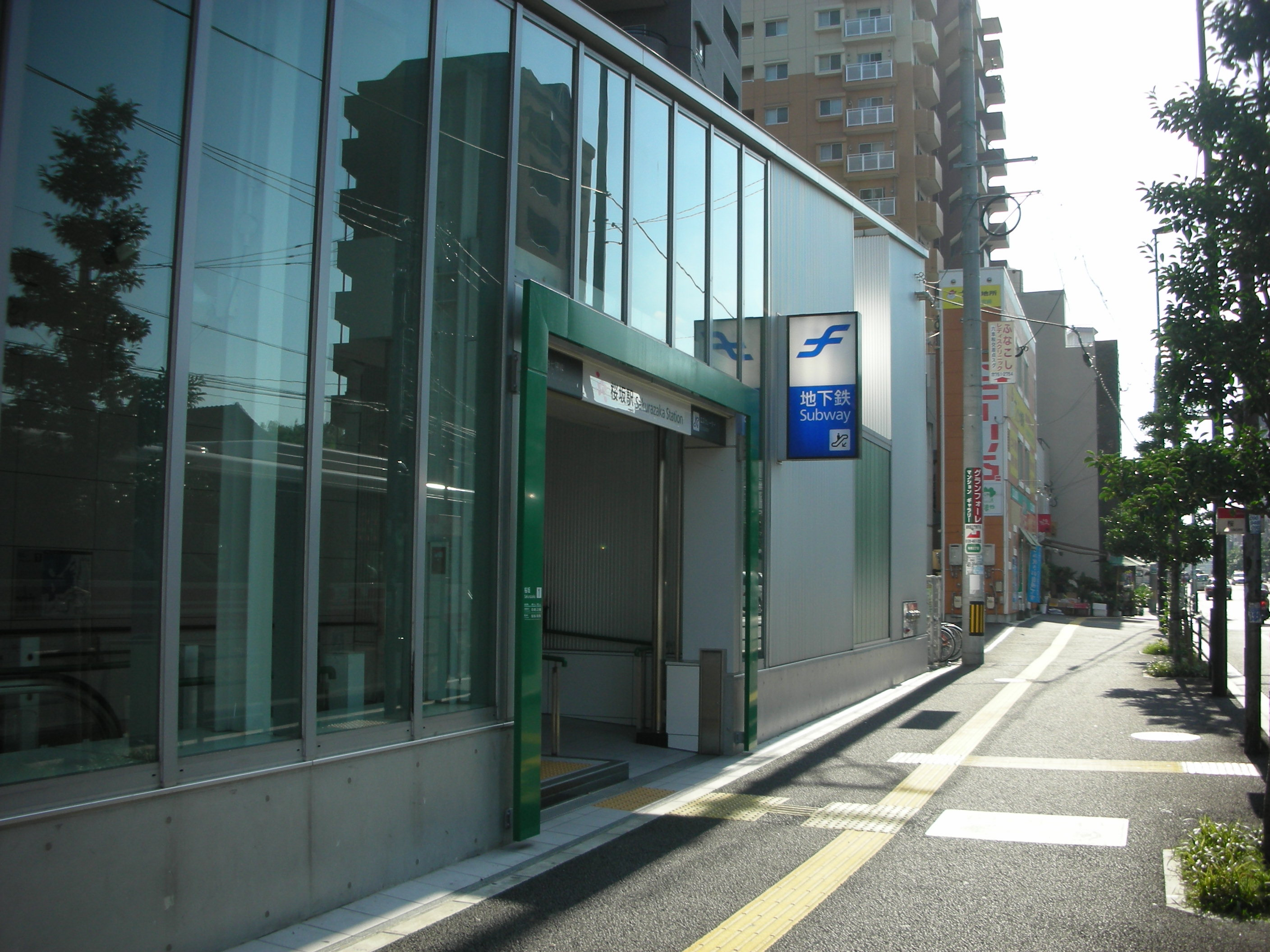

General information
- Location: Chūō, Fukuoka, Fukuoka; Japan
- System: Fukuoka City Subway station
- Operator: Fukuoka City Subway
- Line: Nanakuma Line

Other information
- Station code: N12

History
- Opened: February 3, 2005; 21 years ago

Passengers
- 2006: 1,155 daily

Services
Preceding station	Fukuoka City Subway	Following station
Ropponmatsu N11 towards Hashimoto	Nanakuma Line	Yakuin-ōdōri N13 towards Hakata
Location

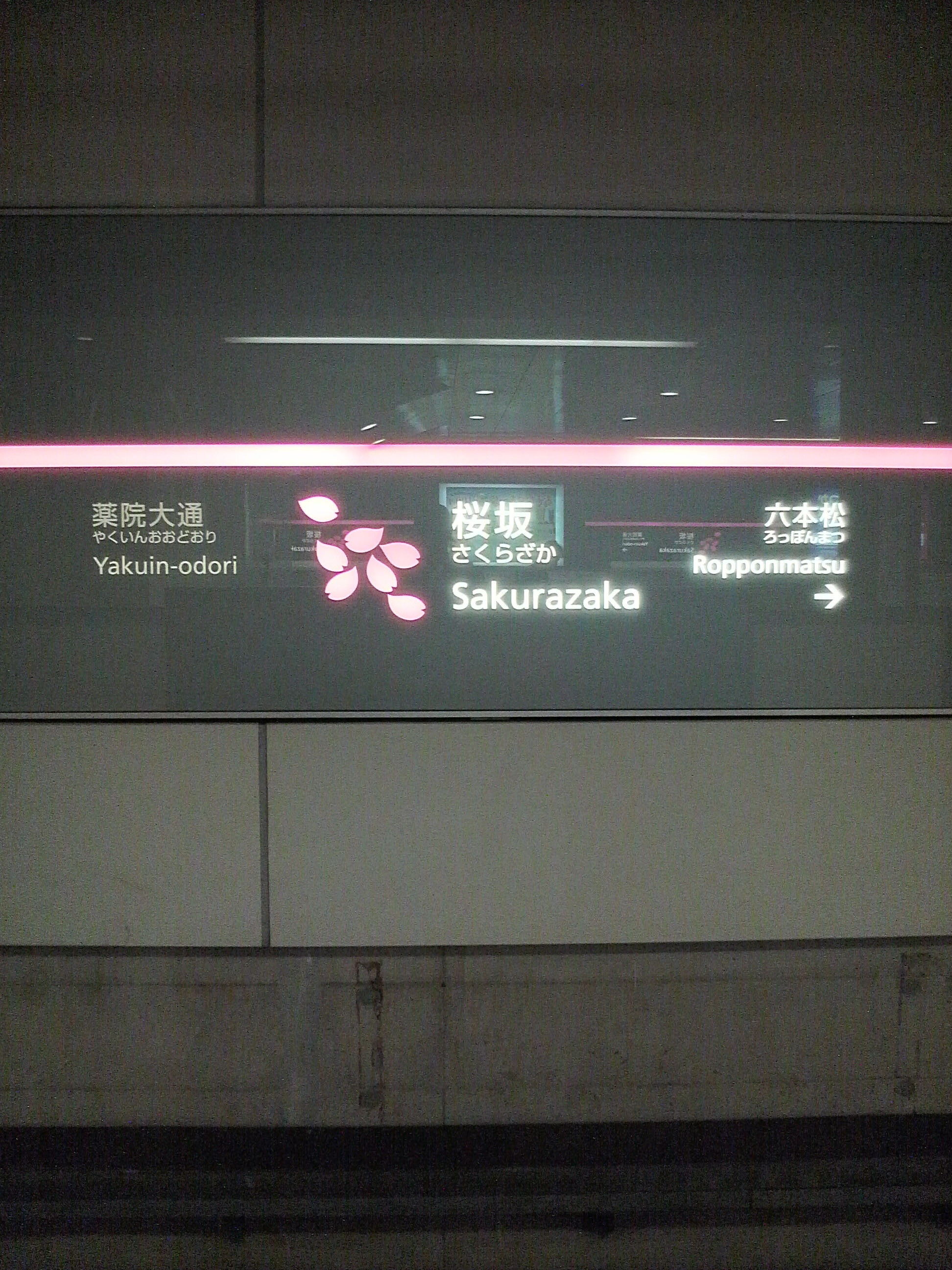
Station symbol

Sakurazuka Station (桜坂駅) is a subway station on the Fukuoka City Subway Nanakuma Line in Chūō-ku, Fukuoka in Japan. Sakurazuka is literally "cherry blossom slope" in Japanese, so its station symbol is of seven pink cherry blossom petals fluttering in the wind.

== Lines ==
- Fukuoka City Subway
  - Nanakuma Line

== Platforms ==
1	■ Nanakuma Line	for Hakata
2	■ Nanakuma Line	for Hashimoto

== Vicinity ==
- 7-Eleven
- Sakurazaka Post Office
- La Palate Supermarkets
- Sakurazaka Central Hospital
- Church of St Martin
- Hakata Church
- Taisei Junior and Senior High School
- Blood Research Institute
- Taipei Economic and Cultural Representative Office Fukuoka branch office
- Chikushi Jogakuen Girl's High School
- Agora Fukuoka Yamanoue Hotel

== History ==
- February 3, 2005: Opening of the station
