= List of registered monuments (Japan) =

A registered monument (登録記念物, tōroku kinen butsu) includes historic sites, places of scenic beauty, and natural monuments registered (as opposed to designated, for which see monuments of Japan) in accordance with the Law for the Protection of Cultural Properties 1950. As of 21 November 2014, there were ninety-three registered monuments, Makino Memorial Garden and the former residence of Okakura Tenshin being registered both as Historic Sites and Places of Scenic Beauty.

Monument	Municipality	Prefecture	Comments	Designation	Image	Coordinates	Ref.
Makino Memorial Garden 牧野記念庭園 (牧野富太郎宅跡); Makino kinen teien (Makino Tomitarō taku ato)	Nerima	Tokyo	commemorates Makino Tomitarō, "Father of Japanese Botany"	Historic Site, Place of Scenic Beauty		35°44′47″N 139°35′07″E	
Okakura Tenshin Former Residence and Gardens with Ōizura-Koizura 岡倉天心旧宅・庭園及び大五浦・小五浦; Okakura Tenshin kyūtaku・teien oyobi Ōizura・Koizura	Ibaraki	Ibaraki	includes the site of the Rokkakudō	Historic Site, Place of Scenic Beauty		36°50′00″N 140°48′12″E	
Tateyama Erosion Control Railway 立山砂防工事専用軌道; Tateyama sabō kōji sen'yō kidō	Tateyama	Toyama	for servicing works on the Jōganji River	Historic Site		36°33′55″N 137°29′20″E	
Tachibai Canal 立梅用水; Tachibai yōsui	Matsusaka, Taki	Mie		Historic Site			
Kumohara Erosion Control Facilities 雲原砂防関連施設群; Kumohara sabō kanren shisetsugun	Fukuchiyama	Kyoto		Historic Site		35°26′38″N 135°04′25″E	
Nagasaki Atomic Bomb Sites (Urakami Cathedral Former Bell Tower) 長崎原爆遺跡（浦上天主堂旧鐘楼） Nagasaki genbaku iseki (Urakami Tenshudō kyū-shōrō)	Nagasaki	Nagasaki		Historic Site		32°46′34″N 129°52′06″E	
Nagasaki Atomic Bomb Sites (Former Shiroyama National School Buildings) 長崎原爆遺跡（旧城山国民学校校舎） Nagasaki genbaku iseki (kyū-Shiroyama kokumin gakkō kōsha)	Nagasaki	Nagasaki		Historic Site		32°46′25″N 129°51′27″E	
Nagasaki Atomic Bomb Sites (Former Nagasaki Medical School Gateposts) 長崎原爆遺跡（旧長崎医科大学門柱） Nagasaki genbaku iseki (kyū-Nagasaki Ika Daigaku monchū)	Nagasaki	Nagasaki		Historic Site			
Nagasaki Atomic Bomb Sites (Sannō Jinja Torii) 長崎原爆遺跡（山王神社二の鳥居） Nagasaki genbaku iseki (Sannō Jinja ni-no-torii)	Nagasaki	Nagasaki		Historic Site		32°46′03″N 129°52′07″E	
Heshikiya Sugar Refining Site 平敷屋製糖工場跡; Heshikiya seitō kōjō ato	Uruma	Okinawa		Historic Site			
Hakodate Park 函館公園; Hakodate kōen	Hakodate	Hokkaidō		Place of Scenic Beauty		41°45′22″N 140°42′56″E	
Former Kikuchi Family Gardens (Hirosaki Akenoboshi Kindergarten Gardens) 旧菊池氏庭園（弘前明の星幼稚園庭園） kyū-Kikuchi-shi teien (Hirosaki Akenoboshi yōchien teien)	Hirosaki	Aomori		Place of Scenic Beauty		40°36′53″N 140°27′48″E	
Narumi Family Gardens 鳴海氏庭園; Narumi-shi teien	Kuroishi	Aomori		Place of Scenic Beauty		40°38′40″N 140°35′48″E	
Yōki-en 揚亀園; Yōki-en	Hirosaki	Aomori		Place of Scenic Beauty		40°36′41″N 140°28′10″E	
Moriai Family Gardens 盛合氏庭園; Moriai-shi teien	Miyako	Iwate		Place of Scenic Beauty		39°38′19″N 141°57′38″E	
Former Nanbu Family Villa Gardens 旧南部氏別邸庭園 kyū-Nanbu-shi bettei teien	Morioka	Iwate		Place of Scenic Beauty		39°42′39″N 141°09′44″E	
Nanshōsō Gardens 南昌荘庭園; Nanshōsō teien	Morioka	Iwate		Place of Scenic Beauty		39°41′44″N 141°08′55″E	
Butsugaiken Gardens 物外軒庭園; Butsugaiken teien	Ashikaga	Tochigi		Place of Scenic Beauty		36°20′21″N 139°26′29″E	
Ganka-en 巖華園; Ganka-en	Ashikaga	Tochigi		Place of Scenic Beauty		36°21′41″N 139°27′52″E	
Former Yamasaki Family Villa Gardens 旧山崎氏別邸庭園 kyū-Yamasaki-shi bettei teien	Kawagoe	Saitama		Place of Scenic Beauty		35°55′18″N 139°29′04″E	
Former Yoshida Family Gardens 旧吉田氏庭園 kyū-Yoshida-shi teien	Kashiwa	Chiba		Place of Scenic Beauty		35°52′05″N 139°58′35″E	
Noda City Hall Gardens 野田市市民会館 (旧茂木佐平治氏) 庭園; Noda-shi shimin kaikan (kyū-Mogisa Beiji-shi) teien	Noda	Chiba		Place of Scenic Beauty		35°56′44″N 139°51′57″E	
Grounds of the National Museum of Western Art 野田市市民会館園地; Kokuritsu Seiyō Bijutsukan enchi	Taitō	Tokyo		Place of Scenic Beauty		35°42′54″N 139°46′32″E	
Yokohama Park 横浜公園; Yokohama kōen	Yokohama	Kanagawa		Place of Scenic Beauty		35°26′37″N 139°38′25″E	
Onshi Hakone Park 恩賜箱根公園; Onshi Hakone kōen	Hakone	Kanagawa		Place of Scenic Beauty		35°11′47″N 139°01′33″E	
Gōra Park 強羅公園; Gōra kōen	Hakone	Kanagawa		Place of Scenic Beauty		35°14′55″N 139°02′46″E	
Yamashita Park 山下公園; Yamashita kōen	Yokohama	Kanagawa		Place of Scenic Beauty		35°26′44″N 139°39′00″E	
Shinsenkyō 神仙郷; Shinsenkyō	Hakone	Kanagawa	gardens of the Hakone Museum of Art (箱根美術館)	Place of Scenic Beauty		35°14′53″N 139°02′34″E	
Japan National Route 133 日本大通り; Nihon ōdōri	Yokohama	Kanagawa		Place of Scenic Beauty		35°26′47″N 139°38′33″E	
Former Ishizaki Family Gardens 旧石崎氏庭園 (石泉荘庭園) kyū-Ishizaki shi teien (Sekisensō teien)	Shibata	Niigata		Place of Scenic Beauty		37°56′28″N 139°19′42″E	
Former Saitō Family Villa Gardens 旧齋藤氏別邸庭園 kyū-Saitō-shi bettei teien	Niigata	Niigata		Place of Scenic Beauty		37°55′33″N 139°02′25″E	
Kakyō Park 花筐公園; Kakyō kōen	Echizen	Fukui		Place of Scenic Beauty		35°55′10″N 136°14′15″E	
Tsubokawa Family Gardens 坪川氏庭園; Tsubokawa-shi teien	Sakai	Fukui		Place of Scenic Beauty		36°09′16″N 136°20′07″E	
Former Yamadera Jōzan Family Gardens 旧山寺常山氏庭園; Kyū-Yamadera Jōzan-shi teien	Nagano	Nagano		Place of Scenic Beauty		36°33′28″N 138°11′49″E	
Grounds of Zōzan Jinja 象山神社園池; Zōzan Jinja enchi	Nagano	Nagano		Place of Scenic Beauty		36°33′35″N 138°11′47″E	
Ōki Family Gardens 大木氏庭園; Ōki-shi teien	Nagano	Nagano		Place of Scenic Beauty		36°33′32″N 138°11′47″E	
Nonaka Family Gardens 野中氏庭園; Nonaka-shi teien	Nagano	Nagano		Place of Scenic Beauty		36°33′39″N 138°11′45″E	
Imai Family Gardens 今井氏庭園; Imai-shi teien	Nagano	Nagano		Place of Scenic Beauty			
Handa Family Gardens 半田氏庭園; Handa-shi teien	Nagano	Nagano		Place of Scenic Beauty			
Miyazawa Family Gardens 宮澤氏庭園; Miyazawa-shi teien	Nagano	Nagano		Place of Scenic Beauty			
Taishō-en 帯笑園; Taishō-en	Numazu	Shizuoka		Place of Scenic Beauty		35°05′44″N 138°51′49″E	
Tsuruma Park 鶴舞公園; Tsuruma kōen	Nagoya	Aichi		Place of Scenic Beauty		35°09′19″N 136°55′14″E	
Eight Views of Omi (autumn geese at Katata) 近江八景 (堅田落雁); Ōmi hakkei (Katata rakugan)	Ōtsu	Shiga		Place of Scenic Beauty		35°06′35″N 135°55′18″E	
Eight Views of Omi (evening bell at Mii-dera) 近江八景 (三井晩鐘); Ōmi hakkei (Mii no banshō)	Ōtsu	Shiga		Place of Scenic Beauty		35°06′36″N 135°55′18″E	
Former Nishio Family Gardens 旧西尾氏庭園 kyū-Nishio-shi teien	Suita	Osaka		Place of Scenic Beauty		34°45′23″N 135°31′25″E	
Former Nakanishi Family Gardens 旧中西氏庭園 kyū-Nakanishi-shi teien	Suita	Osaka		Place of Scenic Beauty			
Nishiyama Family Gardens 西山氏庭園; Nishiyama-shi teien	Toyonaka	Osaka		Place of Scenic Beauty		34°46′38″N 135°27′44″E	
Minami Family Gardens 南氏庭園; Minami-shi teien	Hannan	Osaka		Place of Scenic Beauty			
Mitoro Gardens みとろ苑庭園; Mitoro-en teien	Kakogawa	Hyōgo		Place of Scenic Beauty		34°48′02″N 134°53′56″E	
Kajiwara Family Gardens 梶原氏(西梶原)庭園; Kajiwara-shi (Nishi-Kajiwara) teien	Himeji	Hyōgo		Place of Scenic Beauty		34°46′44″N 134°45′34″E	
Ogawa Family Gardens 小河氏庭園; Ogawa-shi teien	Miki	Hyōgo		Place of Scenic Beauty		34°47′44″N 134°58′59″E	
Sōraku-en 相楽園; Sōraku-en	Kobe	Hyōgo		Place of Scenic Beauty		34°41′33″N 135°10′54″E	
Higashi Yuenchi 東遊園地; Higashi yuenchi	Kobe	Hyōgo		Place of Scenic Beauty		34°41′19″N 135°11′47″E	
Kōdai-in Gardens 光臺院庭園; Kōdai'in teien	Kōya	Wakayama		Place of Scenic Beauty		34°13′02″N 135°35′07″E	
Yōchi-in Gardens 桜池院庭園; Yōchi'in teien	Kōya	Wakayama		Place of Scenic Beauty		34°12′42″N 135°34′44″E	
Shōchi-in Gardens 正智院庭園; Shōchi'in teien	Kōya	Wakayama		Place of Scenic Beauty		34°12′53″N 135°34′43″E	
Saizen-in Gardens 西禅院庭園; Saizen'in teien	Kōya	Wakayama		Place of Scenic Beauty		34°12′51″N 135°34′47″E	
Hongaku-in Gardens 本覚院庭園; Hongaku-in teien	Kōya	Wakayama		Place of Scenic Beauty		34°12′57″N 135°35′14″E	
Ogawa Family Gardens 小川氏庭園; Ogawa-shi teien	Kurayoshi	Tottori		Place of Scenic Beauty		35°25′46″N 133°48′43″E	
Ishitani Family Gardens 石谷氏庭園; Ishitani-shi teien	Chizu	Tottori		Place of Scenic Beauty		35°16′12″N 134°13′50″E	
Okazaki Family Gardens 岡﨑氏庭園; Okazaki-shi teien	Tsuwano	Shimane		Place of Scenic Beauty			
Kamei Family Gardens 亀井氏庭園; Kamei-shi teien	Tsuwano	Shimane		Place of Scenic Beauty		34°27′15″N 131°46′00″E	
Zaima Family Gardens 財間氏庭園; Zaima-shi teien	Tsuwano	Shimane		Place of Scenic Beauty			
Tsubaki Family Gardens 椿氏庭園; Tsubaki-shi teien	Tsuwano	Shimane		Place of Scenic Beauty			
Tanaka Family Gardens 田中氏庭園; Tanaka-shi teien	Tsuwano	Shimane		Place of Scenic Beauty			
Former Kajimura Family Gardens 旧梶村氏庭園; Kyū-Kajimura-shi teien	Tsuyama	Okayama		Place of Scenic Beauty		35°03′58″N 134°00′25″E	
Funaki Family Gardens 舩木氏庭園; Funaki-shi teien	Mihara	Hiroshima		Place of Scenic Beauty		34°24′10″N 133°04′33″E	
Hyōtanjima 瓢箪島; Hyotan-Jima	Onomichi, Imabari	Hiroshima, Ehime		Place of Scenic Beauty			
Tokiwa Park 常盤公園; Tokiwa kōen	Ube	Yamaguchi		Place of Scenic Beauty		33°57′11″N 131°17′05″E	
Masui Family Gardens 増井氏庭園（雲門庵露地） Masui-shi teien (Unmonnan roji)	Takamatsu	Kagawa		Place of Scenic Beauty			
Shijūshima 四十島; Shijūshima	Matsuyama	Ehime		Place of Scenic Beauty		33°52′43″N 132°41′49″E	
Ōhori Park 大濠公園; Ōhori kōen	Fukuoka	Fukuoka		Place of Scenic Beauty		33°35′10″N 130°22′35″E	
Former Nabeshima Family Villa Gardens 旧武雄邑主鍋島氏別邸庭園（御船山楽園） kyū-Takeo yūshu Nabeshima-shi bettei teien (Mifuneyamaraku-en)	Takeo	Saga		Place of Scenic Beauty		33°10′53″N 130°01′01″E	
Former Itō Family Gardens 旧伊東氏庭園（四明荘庭園） Kyū-Itō-shi teien (Shimeisō teien)	Shimabara	Nagasaki		Place of Scenic Beauty		32°47′04″N 130°22′14″E	
Seika-en 棲霞園; Seika-en	Hirado	Nagasaki		Place of Scenic Beauty		33°22′09″N 129°33′20″E	
Peace Park 平和公園; Heiwa kōen	Nagasaki	Nagasaki		Place of Scenic Beauty		32°46′33″N 129°51′48″E	
Kobayakawa Family Gardens 小早川氏庭園; Kobayakawa-shi teien	Shimabara	Nagasaki		Place of Scenic Beauty			
Shiramizu Falls 白水の滝; Shiramizu-no-taki	Takamori, Taketa	Kumamoto, Ōita		Place of Scenic Beauty		32°52′54″N 131°16′23″E	
Chinda Falls 沈堕の滝; Chinda-no-taki	Bungo-ōno	Ōita		Place of Scenic Beauty		32°59′03″N 131°31′22″E	
Kōmori Falls 蝙蝠の滝; Kōmori-no-taki	Bungo-ōno	Ōita		Place of Scenic Beauty		32°58′39″N 131°25′31″E	
Tekizansō Gardens 旧成清博愛別邸庭園 (的山荘庭園) kyū-Narikiyo Hiroe bettei teien (Tekizansō teien)	Hiji	Ōita		Place of Scenic Beauty		33°22′00″N 131°32′02″E	
Kiyomizu Family Gardens 清水氏庭園; Kiyomizu-shi teien	Shibushi	Kagoshima		Place of Scenic Beauty		31°29′02″N 131°06′36″E	
Former Hōonji Gardens 旧報恩寺庭園 kyū-Hōonji teien	Nichinan	Miyazaki		Place of Scenic Beauty		35°42′47″N 139°47′05″E	
Former Itō Denzaemon Gardens 旧伊東伝左衛門庭園 kyū-Itō Denzaemon teien	Nichinan	Miyazaki		Place of Scenic Beauty			
Torihama Family Gardens 鳥濱氏庭園; Torihama-shi teien	Shibushi	Kagoshima		Place of Scenic Beauty		31°29′04″N 131°06′24″E	
Kiyan Coast and Arasaki Coast 喜屋武海岸及び荒崎海岸; Kiyan kaigan oyobi Arasaki kaigan	Itoman	Okinawa		Place of Scenic Beauty		26°04′33″N 127°40′36″E	
Nakamoto Family Gardens 仲本氏庭園; Nakamoto-shi teien	Ishigaki	Okinawa		Place of Scenic Beauty		24°20′07″N 124°08′52″E	
Lake Tazawa Salmon (kunimasu) (Specimens) 田沢湖のクニマス (標本); Tazawa-ko no kunimasu (hyōhon)	Akita, Semboku	Akita	once believed extinct	Natural Monument		39°43′11″N 140°06′09″E	
Zenjimaru Persimmon 禅寺丸柿 zenjimaru-gaki	Kawasaki	Kanagawa		Natural Monument		35°35′06″N 139°31′19″E	
Ichikawa Mineral Laboratory Specimen Collection 市川鉱物研究室収蔵標本; Ichikawa kōbutsu kenkyūshitsu shūzō hyōhon	Echizen	Fukui		Natural Monument		35°54′13″N 136°10′09″E	
Toyotamaphimeia Fossils マチカネワニ化石; Machikanewani kaseki	Toyonaka	Osaka		Natural Monument			
Kikuchi Riverbank Hazenoki Avenue 菊池川堤防のハゼ並木; Kikuchigawa teibō no hazenamiki	Tamana	Kumamoto		Natural Monument		32°55′14″N 130°32′33″E	
Kaku Hika's Specimen Collection 賀来飛霞標本; Kaku Hika hyōhon	Miyazaki	Miyazaki		Natural Monument		31°56′24″N 131°25′26″E	

== See also ==
- Monuments of Japan
