= Najima Castle =

Hilltop castle in Fukuoka City, Japan

Coordinates: 33°38′45″N 130°25′23″E

Najima Castle (名島城, Najima-jō) is a hilltop castle, located in Fukuoka City, Fukuoka Prefecture, Japan. Today, only its ruins still stand.

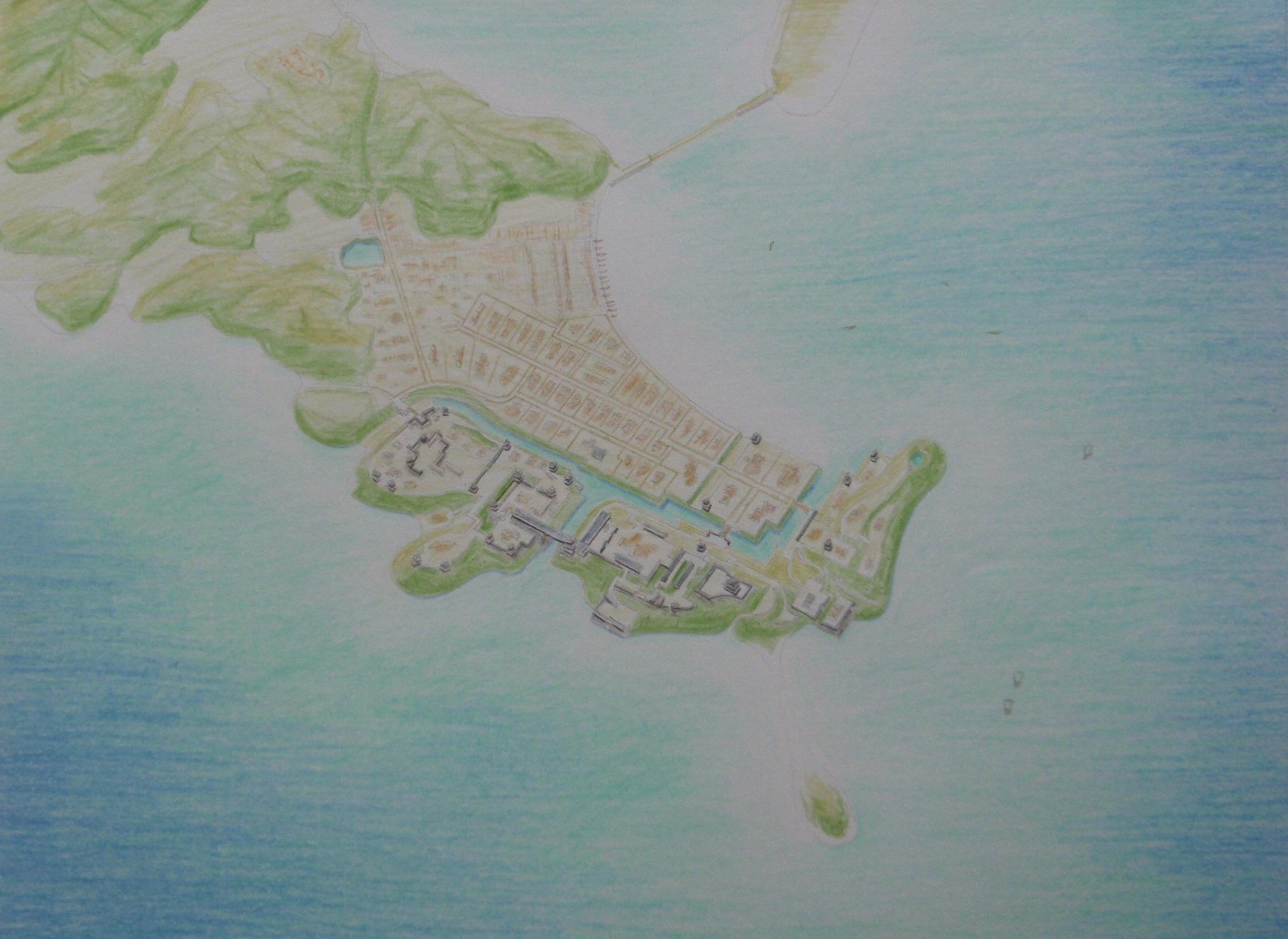
A reconstruction drawing of Najima Castle, oblique view from the north-west, as it may have appeared in the late 16th century.

== History ==
Najima Castle was located on a peninsula projecting into Hakata Bay on the north of the estuary of the Tatara River. The castle fundamentally consisted of the hon-maru or primary kuruwa, the ni-no-maru or secondary kuruwa, and the san-no-maru or tertiary kuruwa, respectively ranging from west to east, and extending for over 900 meters or 2953 ft. The hon-maru, presumably the highest place in the castle, is now about 25 meters or 82 ft. above sea level.

The castle was built by Kobayakawa Takakage, an illustrious Japanese general, in the late 16th century. However, it turned out to be undesirable as the administrative center of the han or clan, for it seemed impossible to construct an extensive castle town or joka-machi, because of the river on the south, the sea on the north and the west, and the foothills on the east. On top of that, the castle was located far from Hakata, a large business center.

The Castle was demolished around 1601, and the stones and the wooden structures were re-used to build the Fukuoka Castle.

== Related Samurai clans ==
- Tachibana clan (samurai)
- Kobayakawa clan
- Kuroda clan
