= Fukuoka Castle =

Castle in Japan

Fukuoka Castle 福岡城
- Chūō-ku, Fukuoka, Fukuoka Prefecture, Japan
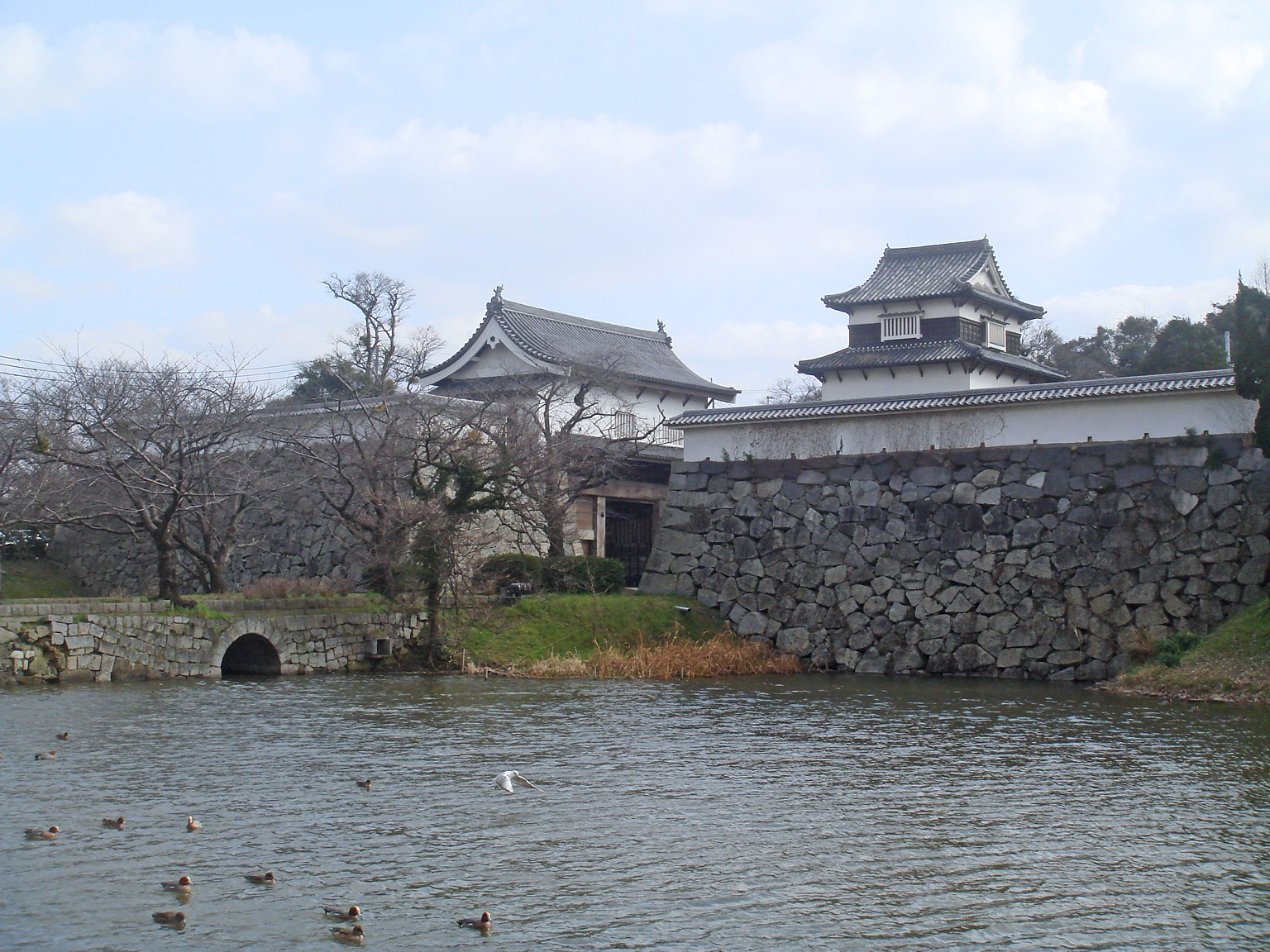
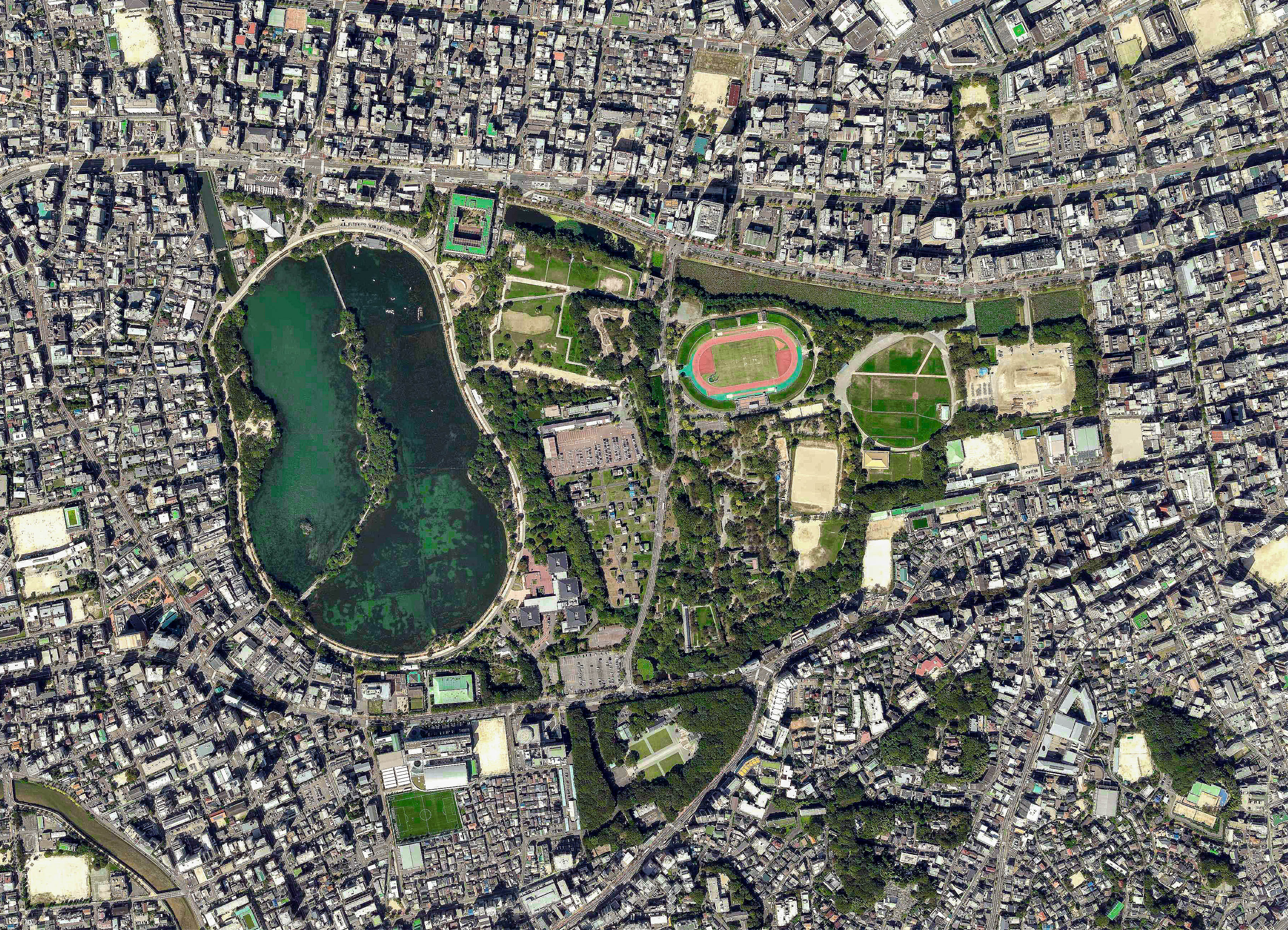
- Shimonohashi Otemon and Shiomi Turret, Fukuoka Castle, in Fukuoka, Japan Aerial photograph of the Fukuoka Castle

Site information
- Type: hilltop
- Owner: City of Chūō-ku
- Controlled by: Japan
- Condition: Currently houses a museum

Location
- Fukuoka Castle
- Location within Fukuoka Prefecture Location within Japan
- Coordinates: 33°35′06″N 130°22′59″E

Site history
- Built: 1601-1607
- Built by: Kuroda Nagamasa
- In use: 1601-1871
- Materials: Tower, gate, earthen wall, stone wall, moat
- Demolished: 1871

Garrison information
- Occupants: Kuroda clan

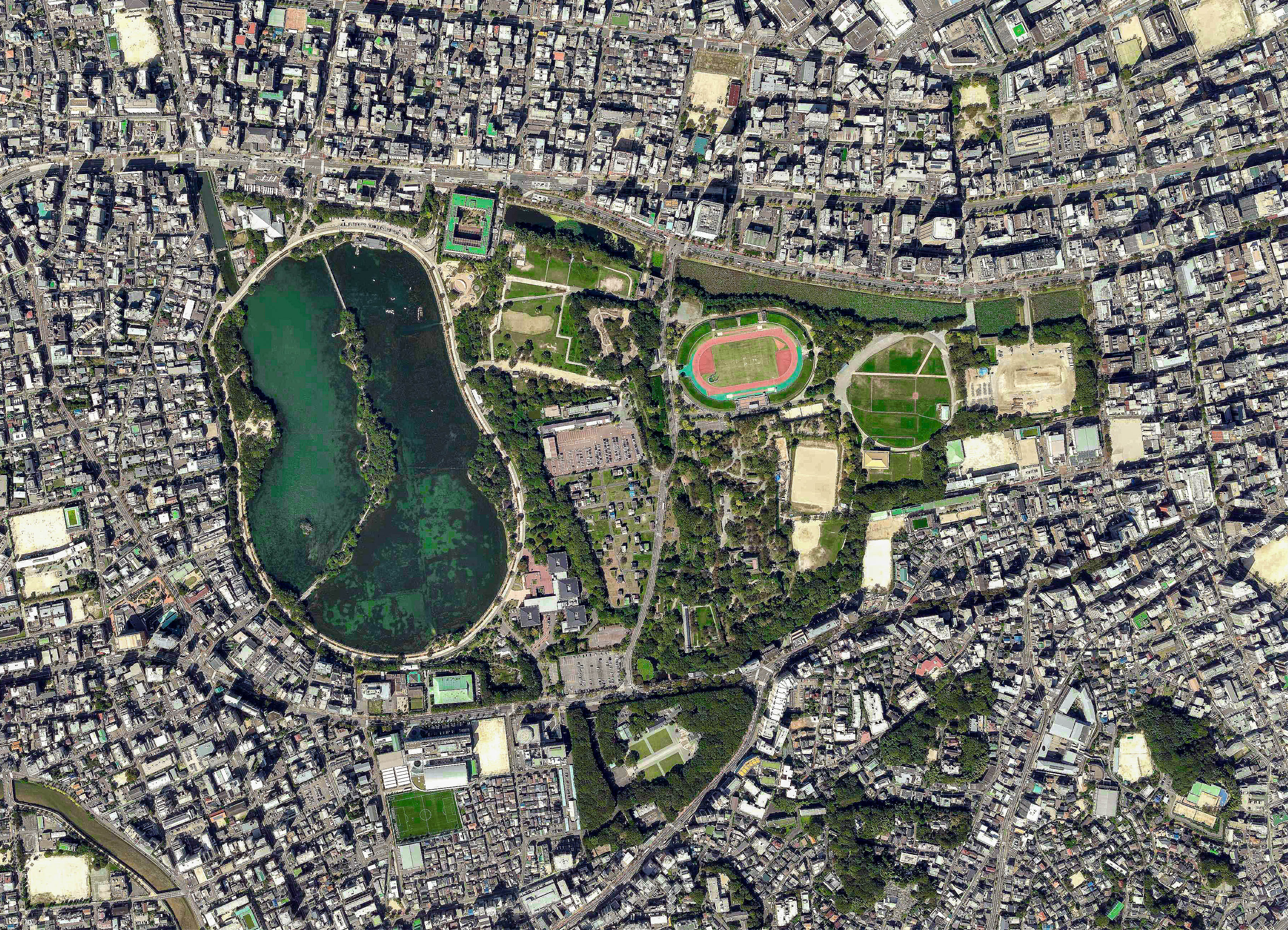
Aeral photo of Fukuoka Castle and Ōhori Park in Chūō-ku, Fukuoka Prefecture, Fukuoka City, Japan

Fukuoka Castle (福岡城, Fukuoka-jō) is a Japanese castle located in Chūō-ku, Fukuoka, Japan. It is also known as Maizuru Castle (舞鶴城 Maizuru-jō) or Seki Castle (石城 Seki-jō). Completed in the early Edo period for tozama daimyō Kuroda Nagamasa, it has been designated a National Historic Site of Japan in 1957.

The castle lies in the centre of Fukuoka, on top of Fukusaki hill. The Naka River (那珂), Naka-gawa in Japanese, acts as a natural moat on the eastern side of the castle, while the western side uses a mudflat as a natural moat. Hakata, a ward with a bustling port, is located on the opposite side of the Naka River to the east. The castle town was established on the northern side, facing the sea.

Much of the castle grounds has been converted to Maizuru Park, which houses several sports facilities, a courthouse, and an art museum. Heiwadai Baseball Stadium, the past home field of the Nishitetsu Lions and the Fukuoka Daiei Hawks, was also located on the castle grounds. Some of the castle's gates as well as its towers and turrets, known as yaguras, are preserved inside the park. The Minamimaru Tamon Yagura (南丸多聞櫓) completed in 1854 is designated as an Important Cultural Property.

The remnants of a korokan (鴻臚館), an ancient guest house for foreign diplomats, were discovered under the castle grounds in 1987, showing that the castle was a vital geographical checkpoint even into the Heian period. This is the only korokan remnant found in all of Japan.

== History ==
In 1600, Kuroda Nagamasa received huge rewards in the form of fiefs in Chikuzen Province for his contributions during the Battle of Sekigahara and moved into Najima Castle (名島城 Najima-jō) to form Fukuoka Domain. Najima Castle had been created by Tachibana Akitoshi and was expanded by Kobayakawa Takakage, but was much too small to accommodate a large domain, leading to the selection of Fukusaki hill as a new castle site.

Construction began in 1601 (Keichō year 6). Yoshitaka, an expert at establishing fortifications, and Noguchi Kazunari, a stonemason who had worked on Edo Castle and Osaka Castle, directed the construction. Completed in 1607 after seven years of work, the castle is said to have contained an impressive 47 yagura, and covered an area of 47,000 square metres (making it the largest in the Kyūshū region). Katō Kiyomasa of the nearby Kumamoto Domain lauded the castle for its grandeur. The dry stone fortification designed by Noguchi was especially impressive, giving the castle the name "Seki-jō" (literally "Stone Castle").

The castle and castle town were renamed "Fukuoka" from "Fukusaki", after Fukuoka of Bizen Province (current Setouchi, Okayama), where the Kuroda family had originated.

Several minor repairs were made during the Edo period, and full-scale renovation was conducted during the Bakumatsu period.

In 1871, (Meiji year 4) the abolition of the han system forced the abandonment of the castle. Many of the buildings inside the castle grounds were taken down or moved to other locations.

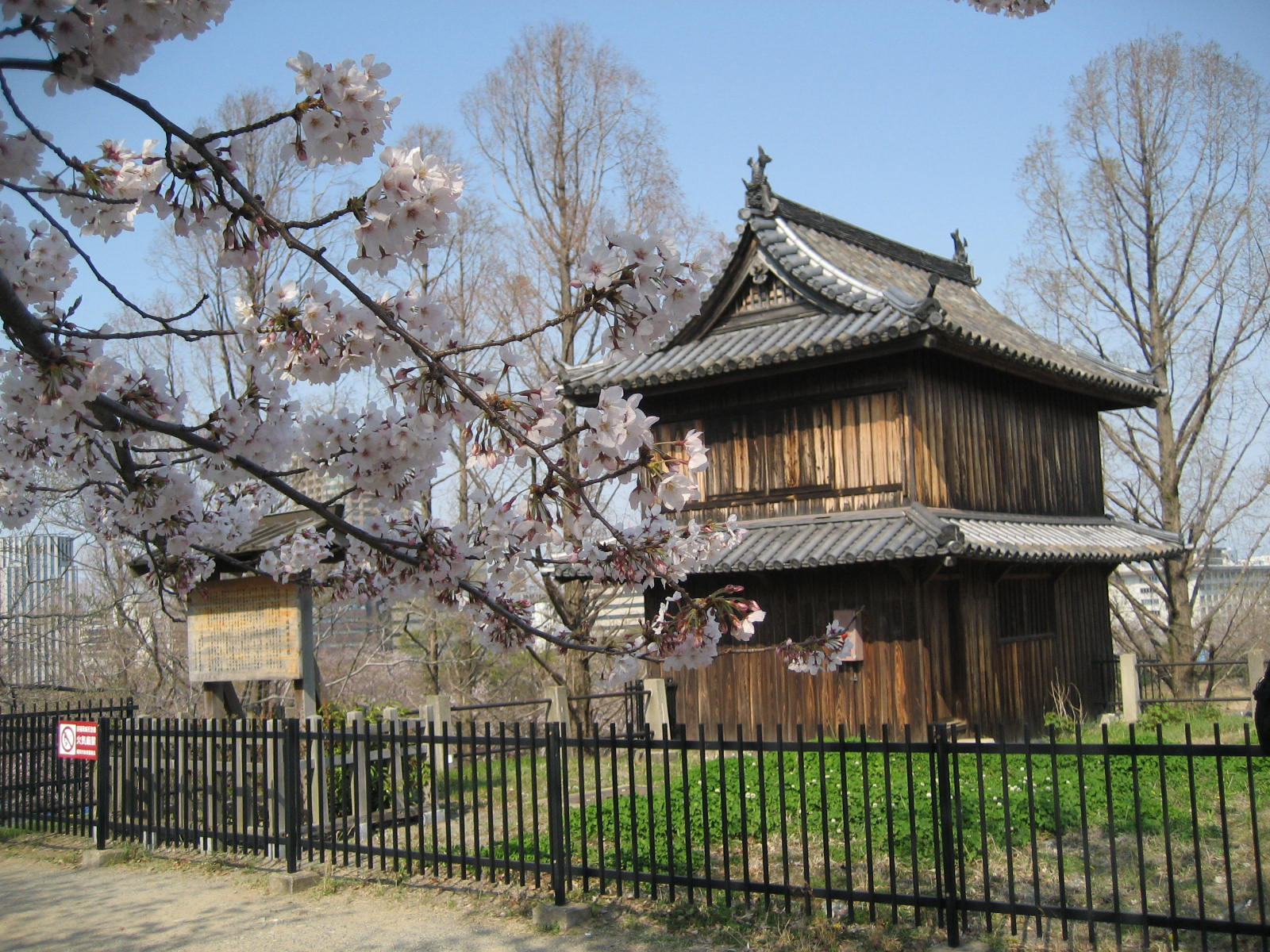
Fukuoka Castle in April when cherry trees are in bloom

In 1920, (Taishō year 9) the Kinen Yagura was relocated to Taishō temple in Yahata Higashi-ku, Kitakyushu. The building was moved back to its original location in 1983.

On August 29, 1957, the castle was decreed a historic site by the Japanese government. Additional gates and yagura were also decreed historical artifacts by the prefectural government in 1952, 1961, 1971 and 1957.

Part of the second main gate was set on fire by a vandal in 2000, and was later reconstructed.

== Selection of locale ==
After his overwhelming victory in the Battle of Sekigahara in 1600, Kuroda Nagamasa was installed as the ruler of Chikuzen Province which he received in exchange for his six counties in Buzen Province. He established his quarters at Najima Castle together with his father, Josui.

Najima Castle was located on a peninsula projecting into Hakata Bay on the north of the estuary of the Tatara River. The castle fundamentally consisted of the hon-maru, the ni-no-maru, and the san-no-maru, respectively ranging from west to east, and extending for over 900 metres (3,000 feet) (maru is here a term referring to a space within a castle's grounds). Built by Kobayakawa Takakage, an illustrious Japanese general, it was an impregnable castle. However, when the aspects of politics and economics were considered, it turned out to be undesirable as the administrative centre of the province, for it seemed impossible to construct an extensive castle town because of the river on the south, the sea on the north and the west, and the foothills on the east. On top of that, the castle was located far from Hakata, a large business centre.

Accordingly, Nagamasa and Josui made a survey of four sites: Sumiyoshi, Hakozaki, Aratsu-yama hill (present-day Nishi-kōen Park), and Fukuzaki. After careful consideration, Fukuzaki was chosen as the castle site. Fukuzaki, in the proximity of Hakata, was a place where a castle town could easily be constructed, and it was valuable as a naval port; furthermore, it had geostrategic advantages; it was surrounded by a cove, rivers, and hills. Thus Josui chose Fukuzaki, which is present-day Fukuoka, now one of the largest cities in Japan.

== Castle components ==
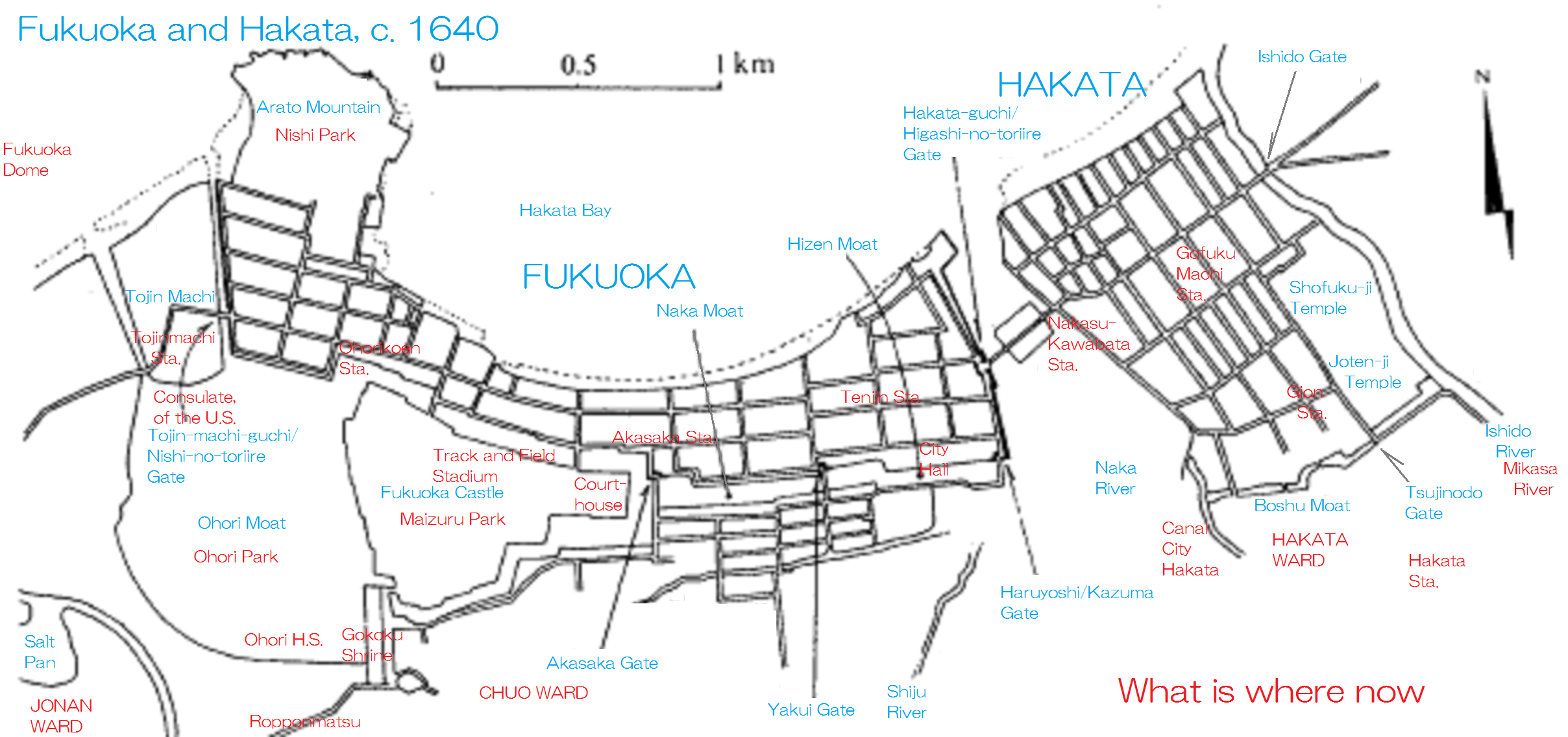
Fukuoka and Hakata, c.1640

The construction of Fukuoka Castle began in 1601 and was completed in 1607. The plan is considered to have been directed by Kuroda Nagamasa. An old document suggests that Kuroda Nagamasa planned a gate and its surrounding area after many consultations with his distinguished commanding officers.

The process of construction is fairly well known, based on archaeological and geological research and old documents, which provided the details for developing an understanding of the process of castle construction.

Because there had been a range of hills from the Akasaka-yama hill (present-day Sakurazaka 2 chome), which is about 30 metres (98 feet) above sea level, to the hill which was to become the site of the hon-maru, an area to the south of the castle was excavated to form a moat. The hills to the south of the moat were also excavated and altered to become gently sloping hills. The top section of a hillock to the northwest of the inner castle was also truncated because it was higher than the hon-maru. The hillock was then used as the site for a retirement residence for Kuroda Yoshitaka.

A cove or an inlet on the west of the inner castle, in which Ōhori Park and Arato are now situated, was utilized for the Ohori Moat (Big Moat) in the cove's southern half and for a town in its northern half by a reclaiming and dredging process. At the same time the Hii (Tajima) River, which was flowing into the cove, was diverted from its course to the west.

On the west of the inner castle, two linear moats were excavated from the inner castle to the confluence of the Shiju River (the present-day Yakuin-shin River) and the Naka River.

This large scale construction required a great number of stones. An analysis of their composition reveals that they came from the islands of Noko-no-shima, Itoshima, Sawara and Kashii, and the region from Noma to Teratsuka. According to old books, the stones and buildings of the dismantled Najima Castle were shipped to Fukuoka and the stones which had been used for the Genko Borui walls (walls built to thwart the Mongolian invaders) and the ancient burial mounds in and around Hirao village and the Hirao-yama hills were also reused for Fukuoka Castle. From these facts it can be inferred that the constructors of the castle had a difficult time collecting the stones. The important walls were constructed under the direction of Noguchi Sasuke Kazushige, who was renowned for his skills in construction stone walls, and who in later years participated in the construction of Edo Castle and Osaka Castle.

For the castle construction, wealthy merchants, Kamiya Sotan and Shimai Soshitsu, provided greatly appreciated financial help. After completing the project, Yoshitaka and Nagamasa named the castle, "Fukuoka", in commemoration of the land of his forefathers, which is present-day Fukuoka, Setouchi-shi, Okayama Prefecture.

=== Hon-maru ===
A hon-maru is a kuruwa located in the heart of a Japanese castle, which is a complex of kuruwa enclosures. Fukuoka Castle was built in the style of Teikaku-shiki or Hashigokaku-shiki (a plan in which the hon-maru, ni-no-maru, and san-no-maru share common defensive lines on one side, because the topography and the castle plan gives a particular advantage to that side) and its hon-maru is situated in the south of the inner castle. The hon-maru measures 125 metres (410 feet) from east to west, and 230 metres (750 feet) from north to south.

The hon-maru is shaped like an abbreviated form of a cross because of the complicated exterior lines of stone walls. The de-sumis (salient corners) on the north side of the hon-maru are rectangular flanking projections which increase the castle's defensibility; the iri-sumis (receded corners) on the south side of the hon-maru also increase the castle's defensibility because they permit cross fire at the enemy at the southern corners of the hon-maru. The top of the foundation of the dai-tenshu (large donjon) is 36.3 metres (119 feet) above sea level, and at the centre of the hon-maru, 23 metres (75 feet) above sea level. The hon-maru of Fukuoka Castle was divided into a northern part and a southern part by the stone foundations for the sho-tenshu (small donjon), the chū-tenshu (medium donjon), the dai-tenshu (large donjon), and the kanritsu-shiki tenshu-kuruwa (a kuruwa formed of rectangular buildings as the final strategic position in time of siege). The southern part is apparently the tenshu-kuruwa (a kuruwa especially designed for the defence of the tenshu), playing the role of the tsume-no-maru (a kuruwa for the final fighting of a siege), and it is the most fortified place in the castle. On the northwest corner of the foundation of the tenshu, the tenshu kuruwa has in addition the kanritsu-shiki tenshu-kuruwa. This particular feature indicates that the castle's purpose was defensive.

The foundation for the dai-tenshu (large donjon) measures about 24.8 metres (81 feet) from east to west, and 22.4 metres (73 feet) from north to south, and covers an area the size of the first floor of the tenshu of Himeji Castle, which has an area of 550.025 square metres. It has long been believed that there had not been a tenshu on the foundation; however, indirect descriptions of a tenshu are seen in a few old documents and the existence of an annex for the tenshu is indicated on some old maps. The problem is now being studied by various researchers. (Kuroda Nagamasa tried to destroy all the documents which were related to Christianity. Since "tenshu" also means "(Christian) God", it is possible that he destroyed almost all the documents which contained the word "tenshu".)

The hon-maru residence, which was located to the north of the foundation of the dai-tenshu (large donjon), served as a domicile for lords until the second lord, Kuroda Tadayuki, built a new residence in the san-no-maru. In the hon-maru residence, there was a 56 tatami-mat (109 sq.m. in Chikuzen) audience chamber and the Shaka-no-ma (Buddha Room) where Iken-kai (regular meetings in which principal retainers were permitted to freely speak their opinions whether they agreed with the lord's position or opinion or not) were held.

In the hon-maru, there were some Shinto shrines, as in the case of many other castles in Japan. On the west of the foundation of the dai-tenshu (large donjon), there was a Niyakuichioji Shrine. This shrine was a branch of the Kego Shrine, which was dedicated to three gods of war. In Meiwa 5 (1768), the Seisho-Gongen Shrine was built to the east of the foundation of the dai-tenshu to deify Kuroda Nagamasa, and in An'ei 2 (1773) the Suikyo-Gongen Shrine was raised to honor Kuroda Yoshitaka in the same building. Both shrines are still in existence in their new location in Nishi-koen Park (on Arato-yama hill) as one shrine, today called the "Terumo Shrine."

=== Ni-no-maru ===
A ni-no-maru (as a common noun) is the second most important kuruwa. The ni-no-maru of Fukuoka Castle consists of four major kuruwas; i.e., Ni-no-kuruwa, Ni-no-maru (as a proper noun), Minami-no-maru, the mizunote, and some minor kuruwas, all which are adjacent to the hon-maru.

The height of the Ni-no-kuruwa, which is an elongated L-shaped kuruwa, is 17–18 metres (56–59 ft) above sea level with the dimension of about 310 metres (1,020 feet) from north to south. This kuruwa was designed to defend the gates of the hon-maru and functioned as a key kuruwa which controlled access to the hon-maru through its many gates. This kuruwa is well fortified; for example, it had a kakushi-guruwa (a hidden kuruwa), which was located to the south of the Kirinoki-zaka Gate and used for laying an ambush against an approaching enemy. Depicted in some old maps are several yaguras and something like a hitching post stable, but there are no other buildings, such as a residence complex.

The rectangular Ni-no-maru measures 135 metres (443 feet) from east to west, 150 metres (490 feet) from north to south, and 15–17 metres (49–56 ft) above sea level. A map made in the early 17th century shows a residence bounded by yaguras, walls, and nagayas (long structures). Another illustrated map of the castle made during the reign of the third lord, Kuroda Mitsuyuki, has a note about this kuruwa which says, "Ni-no-maru, the residence of Hizen-no-kami." Considering that Hizen-no-kami (an honorary title which meant "governor of Hizen") was the title given to the heir of Mitsuyuki, this compound was used as the residence of the heir to the lordship, at least when the map was made in the late 17th century. In addition, another old document indicates that the residence of Mitsuyuki, then the heir of Lord Tadayuki, was in the Ni-no-maru, while yet another document says that during the reign of the fifth lord Nobumasa, his uncle Nagakiyo, the lord of the county of Nogata, had stayed in the Ni-no-maru when he visited Fukuoka. The kuruwa, which is mentioned in the two latter documents, probably refers to the Ni-no-maru.

The Minami-no-maru, another kuruwa shaped like a rectangle, measures about 70 metres (230 feet) from east to west and 110 metres (360 feet) from north to south. The height of the top of the foundation is more than 20 metres (66 feet) above sea level. This kuruwa was not only a defence against an enemy approaching from the south but also a kind of kakushi-guruwa (hidden kuruwa) where an ambush could be laid to launch a pincer attack from this kuruwa and the hon-maru on enemy soldiers approaching the hon-maru. Some documents indicate that there was a residence for the deputy castellan (the lord's councilor who was in charge of the castle during the lord's absence).

The mizunote, which has a dimension of about 120 metres (390 feet) from east to west and 160 metres (520 feet) from north to south, was situated to the east of the hon-maru. The mizunote is a kuruwa which has a well or a reservoir for drinking water. In Fukuoka Castle, the mizunote was built with a catchment reservoir which, in times of siege, also played the role of a sutebori-moat which forced the enemies to take a roundabout way to attack. In addition to the sutebori-moat, there was an L-shaped obi-guruwa along the sides of the hon-maru and Ni-no-maru, enabling simultaneous defensive fire from various levels. According to a report ("The Intelligence Report on the Provinces of Chikuzen, Chikugo, Hizen and Higo") on this castle which was made by a shōgun's shinobi or ninja-spy, there was a flower garden surrounded by bamboo bushes to the south of the reservoir.

=== San-no-maru ===
The inner castle of Fukuoka Castle is the area surrounded by a continuous moat, which measures about 1,000 metres (3,300 feet) from east to west and 700 metres (2,300 feet) from north to south. Even without the moat, the inner castle of Fukuoka Castle, in its grandiose scale, is as large as some of the castles built by the Tokugawa Shogunate, such as Nagoya Castle and Osaka Castle of the Tokugawa Period. However, thanks to the wide roads which ran throughout the san-no-maru, especially from the Kami-no-hashi Gateway through the Shimo-no-hashi Gateway, soldiers could move quickly to the point of attack in case of fire concentrated at some point of the castle.

The san-no-maru, which is also called the san-no-kuruwa, covers a large proportion of this inner castle and is divided into an eastern section and a western section by the Matsunoki-zaka Approach, Takayashiki, and the stone walls between them. The foundation level of the western section is 5–6 metres (16–20 ft) above sea level, while the eastern section is 2–3 metres higher than the western section within the mound lines along the moats, which were 8–17 metres above sea level. The height of Takayashiki is approximately 13 metres (43 feet).

In the eastern section, soon after the castle's completion, Kuroda Zusho, Kuroda Yoshin, Mori/Bori Tajima, and Kuriyama Bingo (principal retainers) initially occupied the residences that were aligned along the edge of the northern moat of the inner castle, from the eastern edge of the inner castle to the Shimo-no-hashi Gateway. On the east of the Ni-no-maru, there was another residence which was initially occupied by Inoue Suo. These residences were continuously occupied by principal retainers from the time of the castle's completion through the last days of the Tokugawa Shogunate. The principal retainers who resided in these residences were often required by their lord's command to relocate there, as were the residents in the castle town. These retainers' residences, which were all approximately the same size, enabled an effective defensive disposition. A castle's garrison of soldiers is said to have been one to two soldiers per tsubo (4 m^{2}.), and accordingly, each residence could contain 1000–2000 soldiers.

After the completion of the castle, in the western section of the inner castle were the Daikan-cho residential quarters. The structural divisions depicted on the map of "The Intelligence Report on the Provinces of Chikuzen, Chikugo, Hizen and Higo", which was written by a shōgun's shinobi and compiled in Kan'ei-4 (1627), probably reflect the early days of this castle. The "Illustrated Map of All Fukuoka and Hakata", made in Shōhō-3 (1646), shows different structural divisions in the western section. According to this map, there were five residences for principal retainers in the western section, and the lord's residence was on the west of the stone wall between the Matsunoki-zaka Approach and the Kirinoki-zaka Approach. The only other facility depicted in the map besides the residences was an independent section of the finance department to the south of Takayashiki. A facsimile of a map which was supposedly made in Kanbun-11 (1671) shows that the lord's residence had moved to the west of Takayashiki. This is the residence which was newly built in the same year, and it went by the name of O-shita-no-yashiki. From this time, the lord's residence did not move until the end of Tokugawa Shogunate. In Hōreki-13 (1763), a considerable part of the O-shita-no-yashiki Residence was destroyed by fire and reconstructed the following year. The residence then underwent renovation in Meiwa-7 (1770). The residence contained an audience chamber where the lord met with his retainers, the lord's living quarters, a large and a small study, a lesson room, secretaries' office, a recording room, a finance department office, anterooms for principal retainers and five commissioners, an apartment complex for court ladies, a kitchen, a granary which stored the five primary food staples, a charcoal storehouse, an archive, a treasury storehouse, a noh stage, and no less than 15 wells.

On the north of the O-shita-no-yashiki Residence, there were two sections of structures previously used as the principal retainer's residences. This site was then used for the Kita-no-maru (an annex to the O-shita-no-yashiki Residence where the mistresses of the lord lived), the firewood storehouse, the treasurer's residence, treasure houses, a wood workshop, and a flower garden.

On the south of the O-shita-no-yashiki Residence there were two sections of structures previously used as principal retainers' residences. These were replaced by a Goyo-yashiki, which may have been a government officials' apartment complex, and then a horse riding ground in Meiwa 8 (1771). In Bunka-8 (1811), the hawkers' office was moved from the south of the castle to an area adjacent to the riding ground.

Facing the Oimawashi Gateway lies the Uemono-kuruwa where the wall stones bear many types of seals carved into them. These seals indicate the groups belonging to different principle retainers at the quarries which provided stones for the castle's construction. This practice enabled administrators to accurately credit retainers with their contribution.

=== Mounds and moats of the inner castle ===
The inner castle of Fukuoka Castle is clearly defined by mounds and moats from the outer castle and the extramural areas. Most of the mounds are well preserved today and they still show the defense capability they offered.

The height of the mound of the inner castle is about 8 meters (26 feet) along the Ohori Moat (Big Moat), 12 metres (39 feet) on the east side, 17 metres (56 feet) at the southeast corner of the mizunote, and 16 metres (52 feet) to the west of the hon-maru above sea level. On the north side, although most of the mound is damaged, it can be inferred that it was about 10 metres above sea level if we consider the detailed accounts of "The Illustrated Map of All Fukuoka and Hakata". Except on the southern side, the mound of the inner castle was usually characterized by a koshimaki-sekirui or a mizutataki-ishigaki (a revetment constructed at the lower part of the mound), some of which can still be seen. In addition, around the gates were strengthened stone walls, which are 10 metres (33 feet) high.

In Keicho 20 (1615), the mound was planted with pine trees that acted as shitomi-uemono (visual barriers), prevented landslides, and served as windbreaks, as flaming torches, as building materials, and as emergency food. On the western and eastern sides, the mound lines have many ori (cremaillere, a front or face with receding steps, which consists of short and long branches) which permit flanking fire. The byobu-ori (tenaille lines formed by making alternate angles salient and re-entering), which can be seen from the south of the inner castle to the area to the east of the inner castle, is enormous. In general, byobu-ori have been shown to resemble the defensive lines of western fortifications. They thus bear eloquent witness to the depth of the foresight of "Kuroda Yoshitaka".

The moats of Fukuoka Castle were very wide compared with the castles of other tozama-daimyo (feudal lords who did not become retainers of the Tokugawa until after the decisive victory of Tokugawa at the battle of Sekigahara in 1600). The moat is about 115 metres (377 feet) wide on the southeast, and on the south, where there are high mounds on both sides of the moat, about 45 metres (148 feet), while to the north of the castle, it is about 70 metres (230 feet) wide on average. The Ohori Moat (Big Moat) has a width of about 600 metres (2,000 feet), even after the construction of the Odote Causeway on the west of the Ohori Moat. The single, wide moat surrounding the inner castle is one of the features of this castle and only in few other castles built in the modern period can such an example be seen. The Ohori Moat was originally more than 3 ken (5.9 metres in Chikuzen) deep, and as for the other moats, more than 1 ken (2.0 metres in Chikuzen) deep at both sides, and more than 3 ken deep in the middle of the moat.

By the mid-17th century, the Ohori Moat, formed by reclaiming and dredging a large cove at the time of castle construction, was filled with sediment and the Torikai area was drained and turned into grassy land. Accordingly, during the period of Empo (1673–1689), the area that was turned into land was developed into rice fields, and the Odote Causeway was built along the shorelines. At the same time, the Komo River was modified to flow on the west of the Odote Causeway so that the silt in the flows would be carried to the sea by the river. After these works, the dimensions of the Ohori Moat were reduced; the water surface was however still more than twice as large as the present Ohori.

== Outer castle ==
An outer castle is a kuruwa that includes the castle town, comprising samurai quarters, commoners' dwellings and temples. This kuruwa is clearly demarcated by defensive lines which consisted of moats, mound lines and gates that separated it from the areas outside the castle. Various writers of old texts differ with regard to the exterior boundaries of the outer castle of Fukuoka Castle; some indicate a smaller area, and some indicate a larger area, but when considering the viewpoint of the science of fortifications, it can be said that the Naka River, the Hizen Moat (present-day Tenjin 1-2 chome), the Naka Moat (present-day Daimyo 1-2 chome), the inner castle, the Tojin-machi-guchi Moat (present-day, Kuromon-gawa-dori Street), and the sea define the boundaries of the outer castle of Fukuoka Castle. The outer castle of Fukuoka Castle measures no less than about 3 km (1.9 mi) from east to west.

The east side of the outer castle along the Naka River was fortified by stone walls which were about 10 metres (33 feet) high and more than 700 metres (2,300 feet) long. At the midpoint of the stone walls, at the entrance from the Nakajima-nishi Bridge, was the Higashi-toriire Gate. The Higashi-toriire Gate was composed of the Kita-mon (the North Gatehouse), the Minami-mon (the South Gatehouse), and a yagura. (A gateway structure where a masugata gateway has two gatehouses facing each other, or where a yagura is placed facing the front of a masugata gate forecourt, is unique.) This grand gateway and the stone walls of the newly built capital of Chikuzen looked down on and strongly dominated the city of Hakata, which had a very long history as a mercantile city. An old book indicates that there was a Roman Catholic church near the gate, within the walls. This may be the church built in memory of Kuroda Josui, which is mentioned in an annual report of a Jesuit missionary to Japan.

The southern side of the outer castle was demarcated by the inner castle and two linear moats along with mound lines, the total length of which was 1,200 metres (3,900 feet). There were three gates along the mound lines. These were called the Akasaka Gate, the Yakui Gate, and the Kazuma Gate (Haruyoshi Gate), respectively from west to east. The moat between the Akasaka Gate Entranceway and the Yakui Gate Entranceway was called the Hizen Moat (Saga Moat), because it was excavated with the help of Nabeshima Naoshige, who was then lord of Hizen Province. The Naka Moat was about 60–110 metres (200–360 ft) wide, and the Hizen Moat was about 60–80 metres (200–260 ft) wide. Both moats are considerably wider than the moats surrounding outer castles in most of the other Japanese castles. The "Chronicle of Lord Naoshige" says that Kuroda Nagamasa sent laborers from Chikuzen to Hizen to excavate the moat on the east of the North Gate Entranceway of Saga Castle in return for the Hizen Moat construction. The moat, excavated with the help of Nagamasa, was called the Chikuzen Moat.

On the west side of the outer castle, there was the Tojin-machi-kuchi Moat (Yana Moat) which was about 17–35 metres (56–115 ft) wide. Along the eastern side of this moat, there was the Matsu-dote (Pine Mound), while along the Ohori Moat continuing from the south end of the Matsu-dote there was the Sugi-dote (Cedar Mound). On the Matsu-dote defensive line there was a single storey gate, the Kuro Gate, which, unlike the other gates of the outer castle, was not a masugata gate. There was a weir at the north end of the moat, and fish were kept in water taken in from the sea.

In 1863, two major batteries and seven minor batteries were built along the shorelines of the outer castle, as well as other batteries around Hakata Bay due to the threat of foreign invasion.

== External defensive elements ==
Defensive elements can also be seen in the areas outside the castle. To the east of the outer castle, Hakata had already been fortified when castle construction began. The defensive lines of this mercantile city probably appeared during the time of the Mongolian invasions in the late 13th century, when a series of walls was constructed to thwart the invaders. In the 16th century, the age of civil wars, Hakata was fortified in full-scale by diverting the course of the Hie (Mikasa) River to the east of Hakata and excavating moats to the south. After the construction of Fukuoka Castle, Hakata seems to have been designated as a demaru (a detached work placed in front of a gate to cover it) defending the Higashi-toriire Gate together with Nakajima (a man-made island on the estuary of the Naka River). To the east of Hakata there was the Ishido Entranceway and Gate, and on the south, the Tsujinodo Entranceway and Gate. Although these gates were located outside the outer castle of Fukuoka Castle, they were still designated as castle gates.

The Yakui River, which was to the south of the outer castle, not only made up a defensive line in itself, but also played an important role in preventing the moat around the inner castle, the Naka Moat and the Hizen Moat, from accumulating the silt which flowed from the heights of the hills to the south of the inner castle. In Enpō-6 (1678), a bridge that connected Haruyoshi Town and the Kazuma Gate Entranceway was newly built. It was placed obliquely so that enemies could not attack the gate directly. To the west of the castle were the Komo (Myoan-ji) and Hii (Tajima) Rivers, which served as defensive barriers.

== Castle town ==
Defensive aspects of Japanese castles extend to the castle towns which surround them. Temple placement at strategic points and street design are the most notable examples. In and around Fukuoka Castle, several Buddhist temples were placed at strategic locations, probably because temple buildings could be used as barracks, temple courtyards as assembling places, and tombstones from temple cemeteries as material to build stone walls. Even after the completion of Fukuoka Castle, temples were still being relocated to strategic points, and in consequence the castle was fortified by degrees.

In the castle town, many streets were planned to be T-shaped or L-shaped, and the streets that led to the Higashi-toriire Gate and to the Kuro Gate were curved. This planning, which is typical of city planning in castle towns of the Edo Period (1603–1868), weakened the enemy's psychological and strategic ability to attack while at the same time it enabled temporary defensive lines to be constructed more easily. This street layout makes modern city planning difficult, and Fukuokans are still having problems driving the severely angled streets which follow the original street design of the castle town. At the same time, it is one of the vestiges of Fukuoka Castle which reminds the inhabitants that they are living in a city that developed from a well-fortified castle.

== Aftermath ==
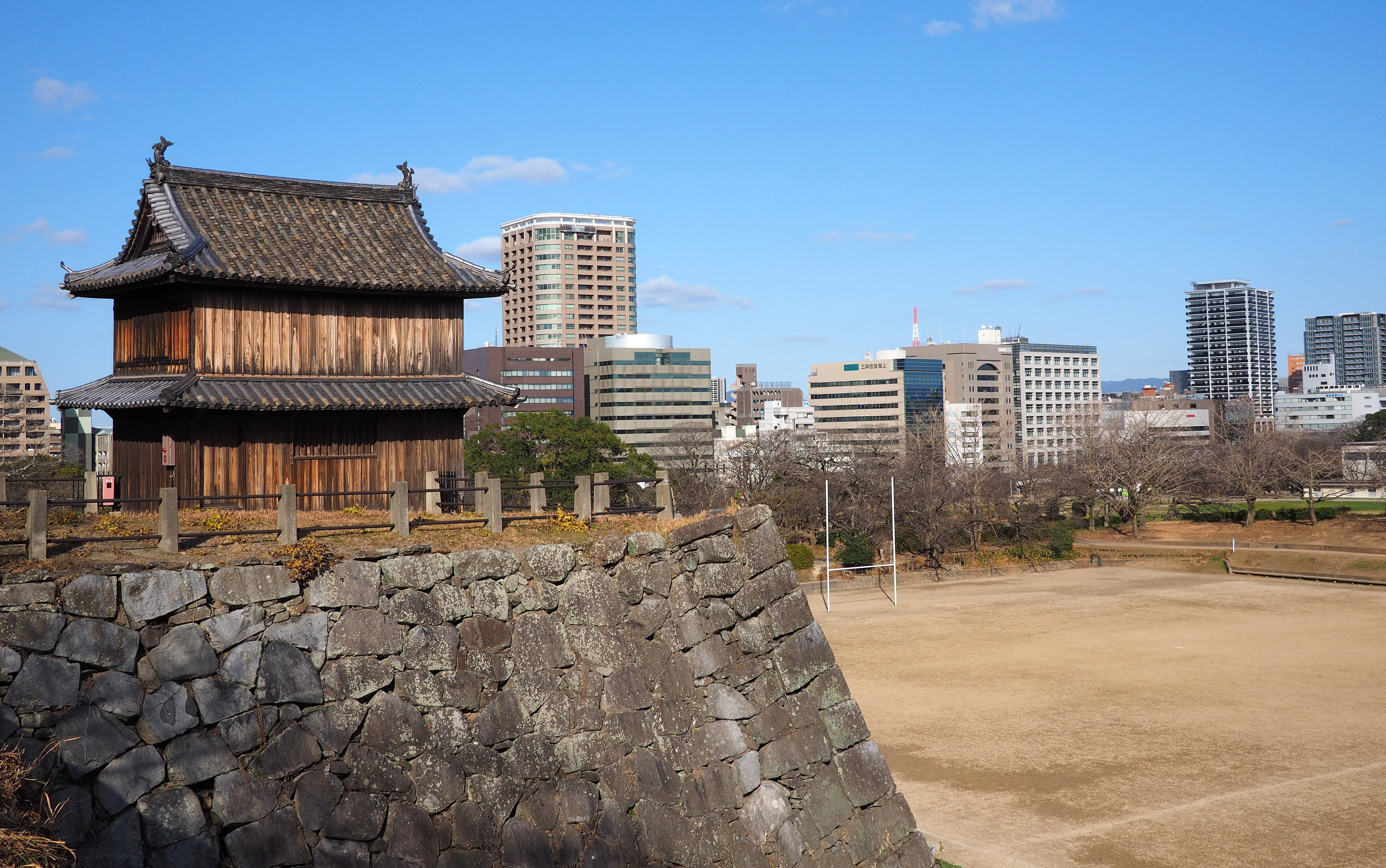
A turret at Fukuoka Castle in 2019

Soon after the Meiji Restoration in 1868, the castle ended its history as a residence of the ruling nobility. The O-shita-no-yashiki Residence was then used as the government center of Fukuoka Prefecture, a new regional administrative unit which adopted the name of the castle. In Meiji 9 (1876) the government centre was moved to the southeastern area of what was once the outer castle of Fukuoka Castle, and the castle was then used as a military complex up until 1945, when the Pacific War ended, and the site began to be used by U.S. American occupation forces.

When the site of the inner castle was designated a national historical site in 1957, most of the castle structures in the inner castle had in the meanwhile decayed, been demolished, or burnt down, except for the following seven structures, which survive up to the present time:

1. Tamon Yagura (Minami-no-maru Nishi-hira Yagura)—Located atop the western wall of the Minami-no-maru.
2. Shimo-no-hashi Gate—The second floor of the structure was removed.
3. (Go-) Hon-maru Omote-(go-)mon (main gate of the hon-maru)—Located to the north of the hon-maru; moved to Sofuku-ji Temple.
4. Hanami Yagura (Cherry-blossom-viewing Yagura)—Located in the southwestern corner of the inner castle; moved to Sofuku-ji Temple, but being returned to its original location.
5. Shiomi Yagura (Sea-water-viewing Yagura)—Located in the northwestern corner of the inner castle; moved to Sofuku-ji Temple, but being returned to its original location. (This structure has long been believed to be the Tsukimi Yagura.)
6. Kinen Yagura (Prayer Yagura)—Located on the northeastern corner of the hon-maru; Moved to Taishō-ji Temple in the present-day city of Kitakyushu and returned to its original location. (The aftermath of this structure is not quite certain, because the exterior of the structure and some documents, including an old photograph, contradict each other.)
7. Inosuke Yagura or Ko-tokiuchi Yagura (Former Clock Yagura)—Located on the western wall of the hon-maru; moved to the Kuroda family's detached residence located to the north of the inner castle, then to the Shimo-no-hashi Gateway. (This structure has long been believed to be the Shiomi Yagura.)

The stone walls in the inner castle, however, are fairly well preserved, except for the following:

1. The stone wall to the south of the Higashi-Ni-no-maru.
2. The stone walls around the Matsunoki-zaka Gateway.
3. The stone walls around the Oimawashi Gateway.
4. Some parts of the revetment on both sides of the moats.

The mound lines are also well preserved today, although many parts of the moats have been reclaimed.

The inner castle site is now used as Maizuru (Dancing Crane) Park and Ohori Park, places of recreation and relaxation for the Fukuokan public. These parks include an athletic stadium, other sports facilities, flower gardens, Fukuoka City Museum of Art, Fukuoka District and High Courts, and Jonai residential quarter.

As for the outer castle, almost all the stone walls, mound lines and structures were demolished soon after the Meiji Restoration. The Hizen Moat and the Naka Moat were reclaimed and the Tojin-machiji-guchi Moat was converted into a culvert. However, a portion of the stone walls to the south of the Higashi-toriire Gate and an upper portion of the northern stone walls (bulwark) of the battery adjacent to the estuary of the Naka River can still be seen today.

== See also ==
- List of Historic Sites of Japan (Fukuoka)
