= Ōhori Park =

Park in Fukuoka, Japan

Coordinates: 33°35′9.1″N 130°22′34.5″E

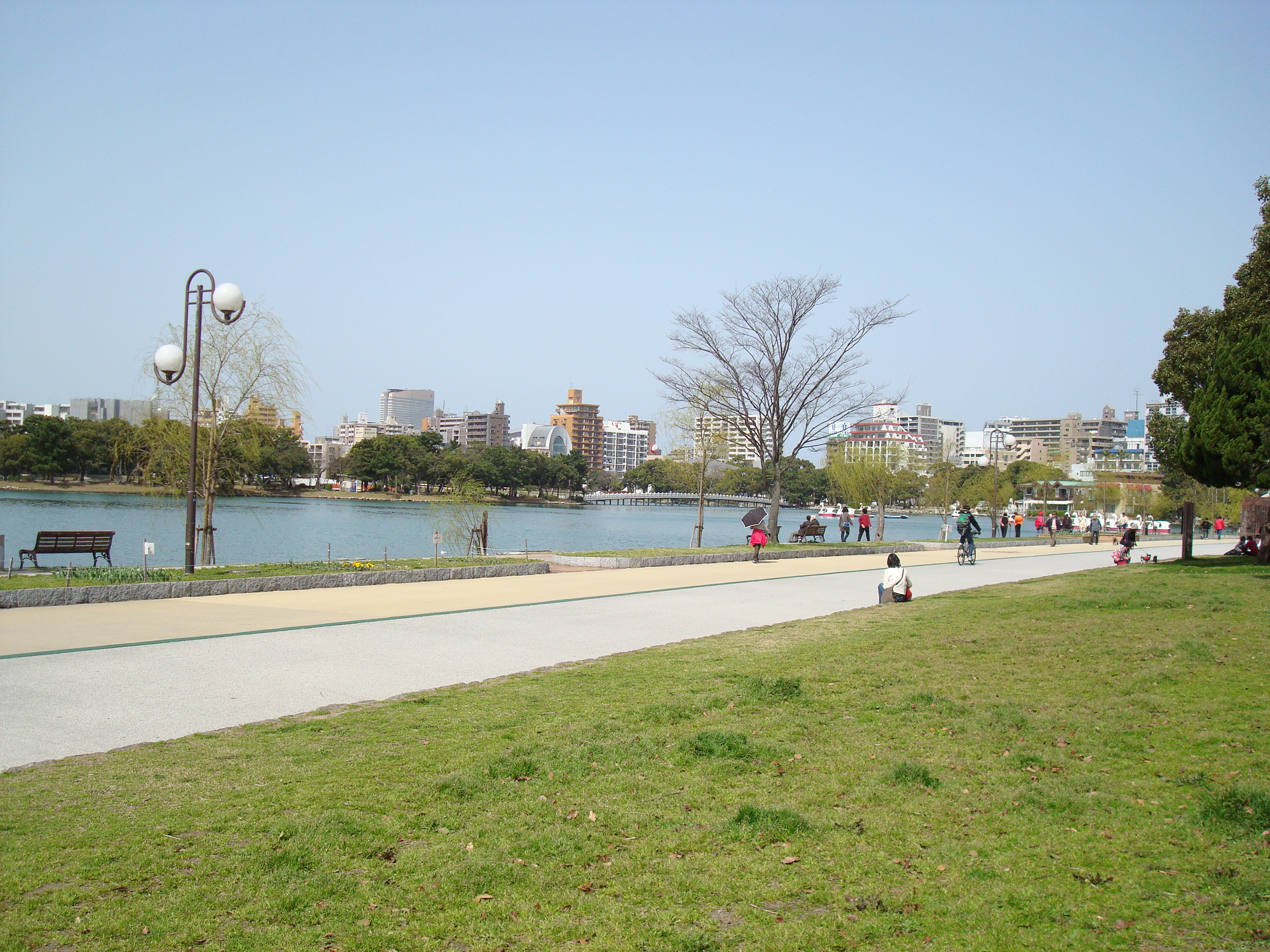
View of Ohori Park

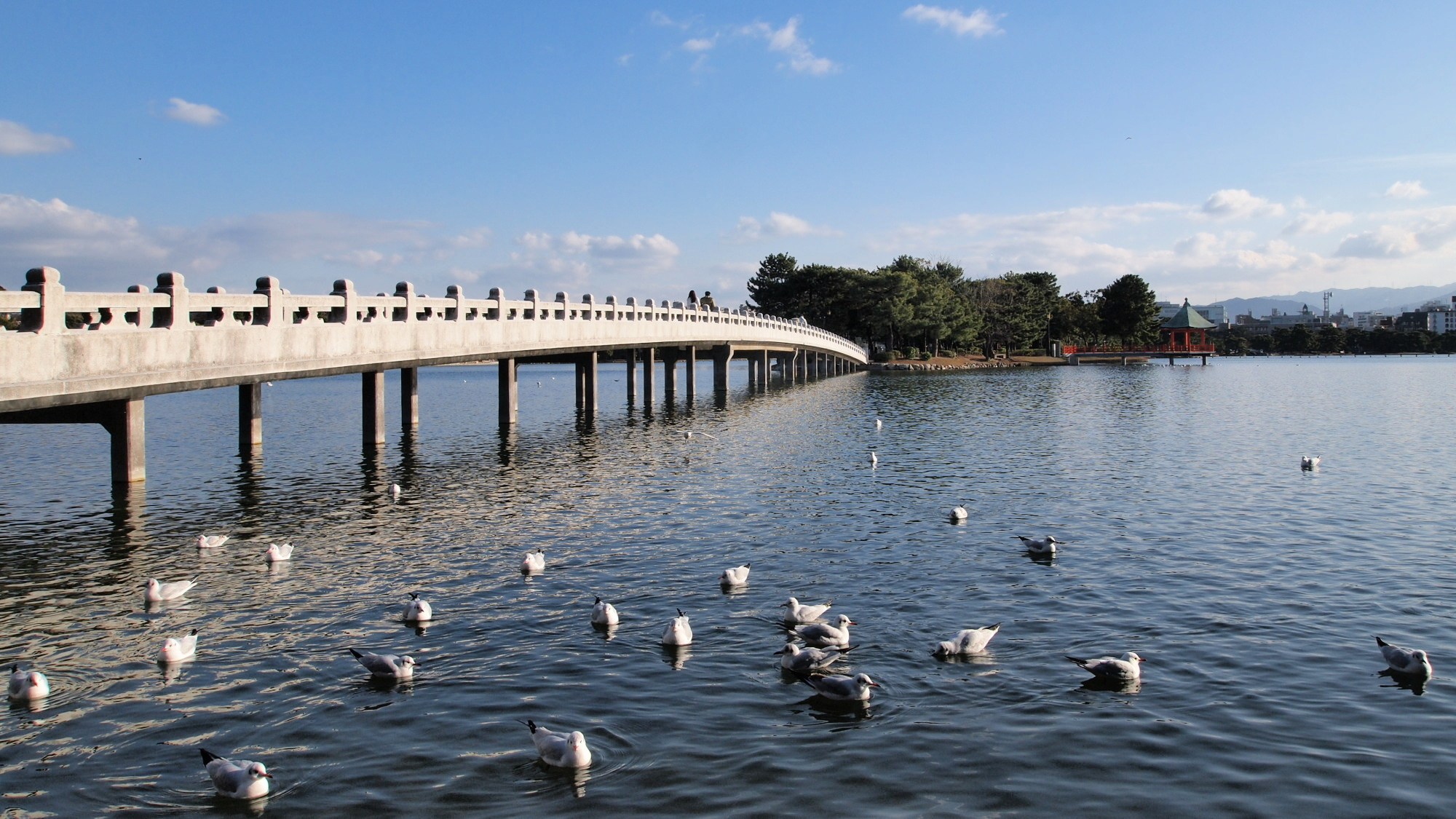
Ohori Park

Noh Theater in Fukuoka

Ōhori Park (大濠公園, Ōhori-kōen) is a park in Chūō-ku, Fukuoka, Japan and a registered Place of Scenic Beauty.

== History ==
The name Ōhori means a large moat and it derives from the fact that Kuroda Nagamasa, the old lord of Fukuoka, reclaimed the northern half of a cove or an inlet called Kusagae which was facing Hakata Bay and made a moat for the Fukuoka Castle. At the same time the Hii (Tajima) River, which was flowing into the cove, was diverted from its course to the west.

The present park was reconstructed by Fukuoka City, modeled on the West Lake of China, and opened in 1929. A fireworks festival is held here every August.

== Facilities ==
The Fukuoka Art Museum and the United States Consulate are nearby.

Heiwadai Stadium also used to stand near Ohori Park. Opened in 1949 and closed in 1997 and demolished the following year, this baseball stadium was home to 3 NPB franchises. The Nishi Nippon Pirates only stayed in Heiwadai for their only year of operation in 1950. The Nishitetsu Clippers/Lions (now Saitama Seibu Lions) played their entire time in Heiwadai during their tenure in Fukuoka from 1950-1978 before moving to Saitama. The last team to call Heiwadai home was the Fukuoka Daiei Hawks (now Fukuoka SoftBank Hawks) for their first 3 years from 1989-1992. The stadium was eventually replaced with the Fukuoka PayPay Dome. During a renovation to Heiwadai in 1987, underneath the bleachers of the stadium, ruins of an ancient facility were found. When the stadium was demolished in 1997, the outfield bleachers were left as archeological work continued until these bleachers were also demolished in 2008 due to concerns over safety. It can be said that the reason why there were ruins found under the bleachers in Heiwadai was because it was built over the ruins of Fukuoka Castle.

== See also ==
- Ōhorikōen Station
