= Chūō-ku, Fukuoka =

Coordinates: 33°35′21″N 130°23′35″E

Chūō 中央区
- Ward
- Chūō Ward
- Flag Seal

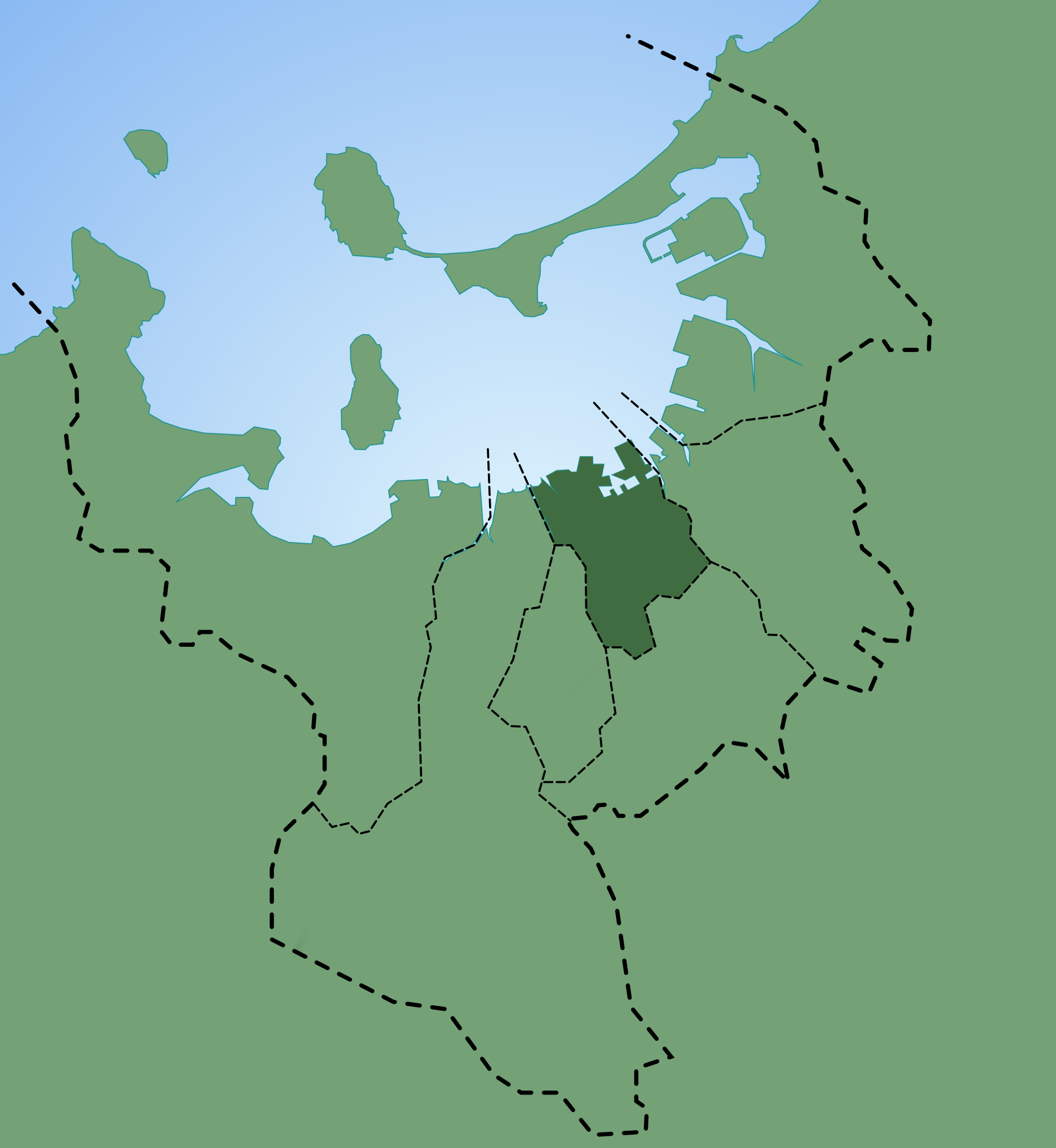
- Location of Chūō Ward in Fukuoka

- Country: Japan
- Region: Kyushu
- Prefecture: Fukuoka
- City: Fukuoka
- Time zone: UTC+9 (Japan Standard Time)

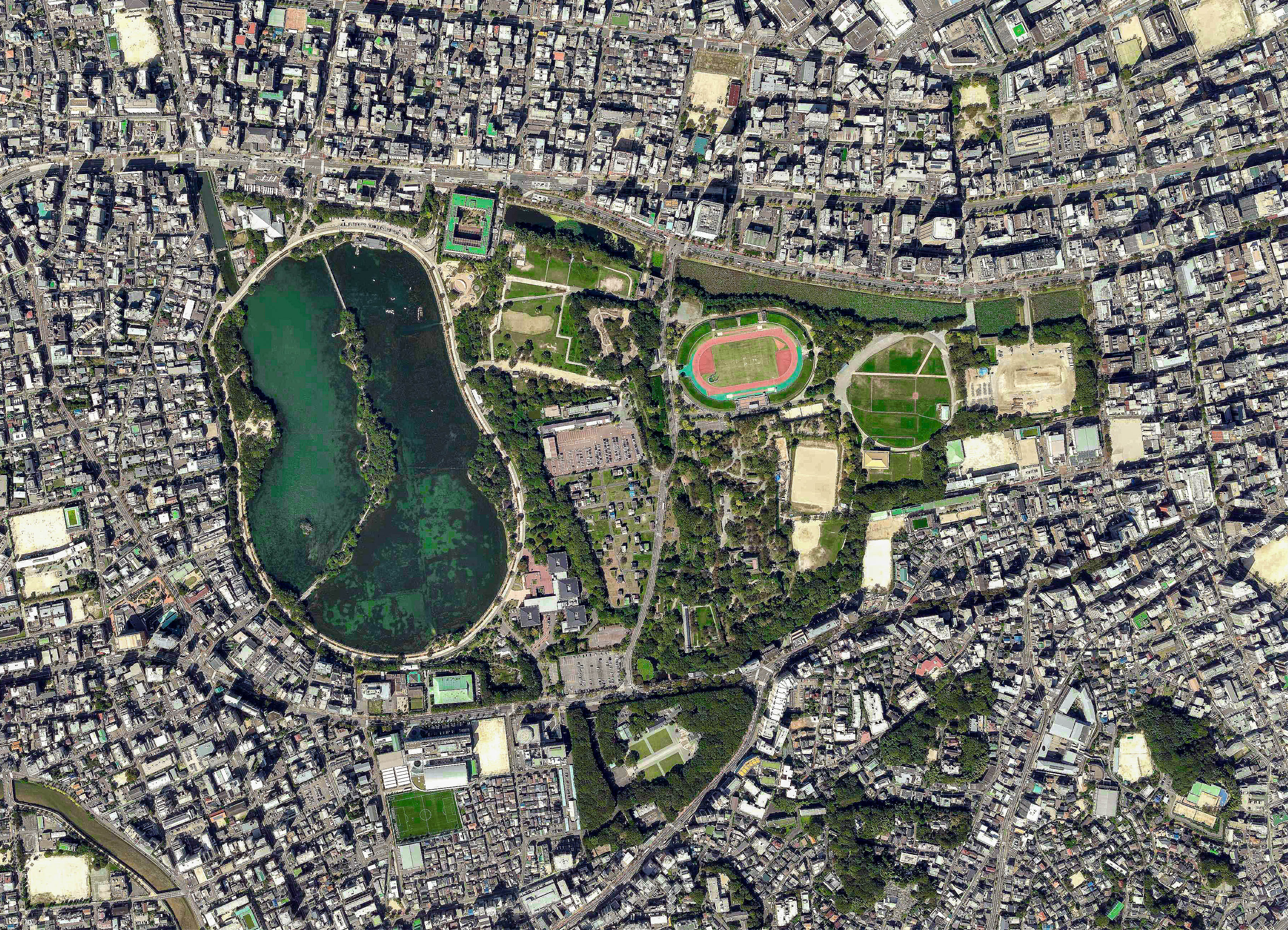
Aerial view of Ōhori Park area, including the remains of Fukuoka Castle

Chūō-ku (中央区) is one of the seven wards of Fukuoka city in Japan. The ward is located in the center of the city and has a high proportion of apartment buildings and single-person households.

It includes Tenjin and Daimyō which are among the largest downtown areas in Kyūshū, Nagahama, which is known for its fish market, and Ōhori Park.

== Main facilities ==
- Fukuoka Art Museum
- Fukuoka Municipal Zoo and Botanical Garden
- Fukuoka Kyuden Kinen Gymnasium
- Acros Fukuoka
- Mizuho PayPay Dome Fukuoka

== Gallery ==
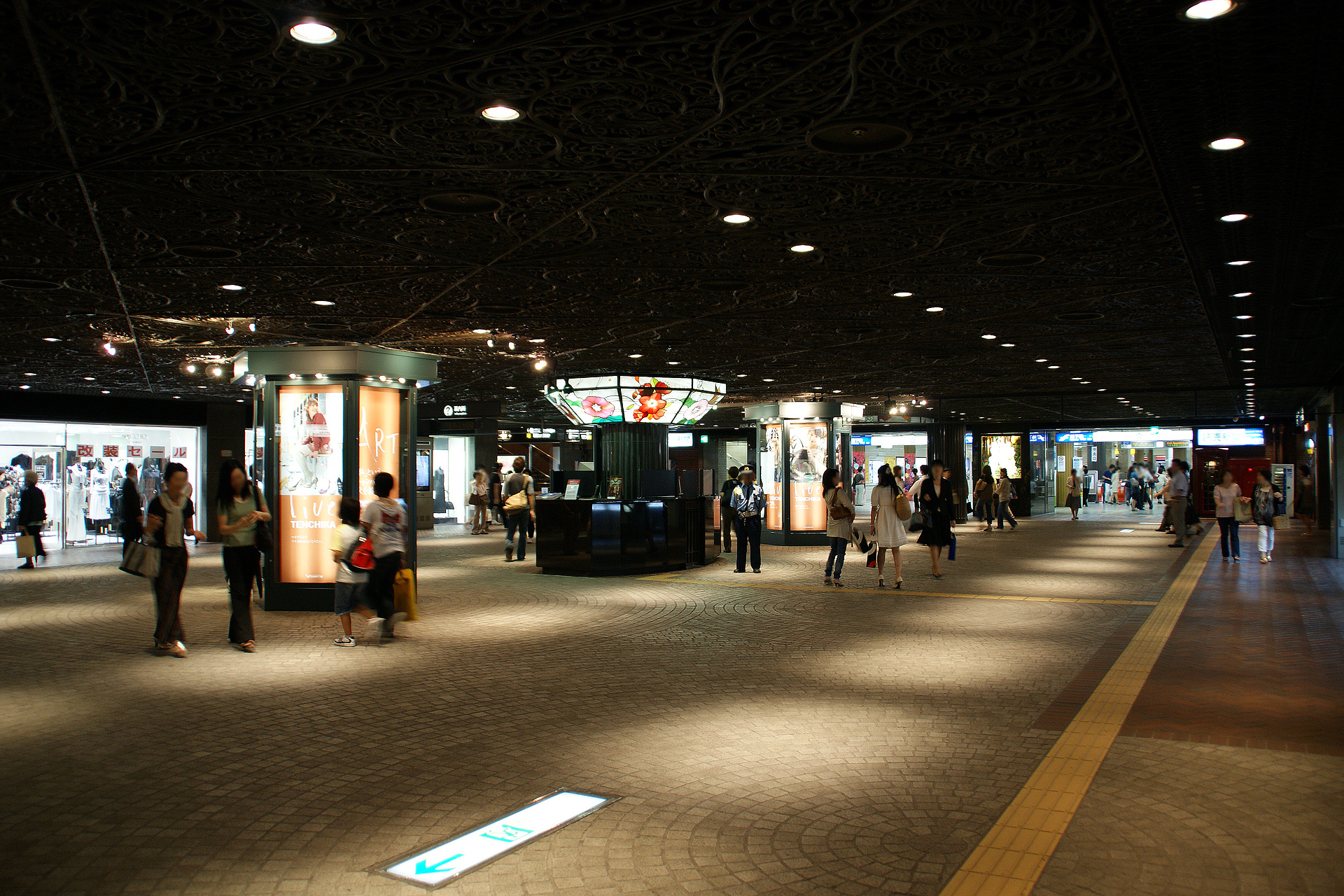
Tenjin Underground City in Chūō-ku, Fukuoka, Fukuoka Prefecture, Japan

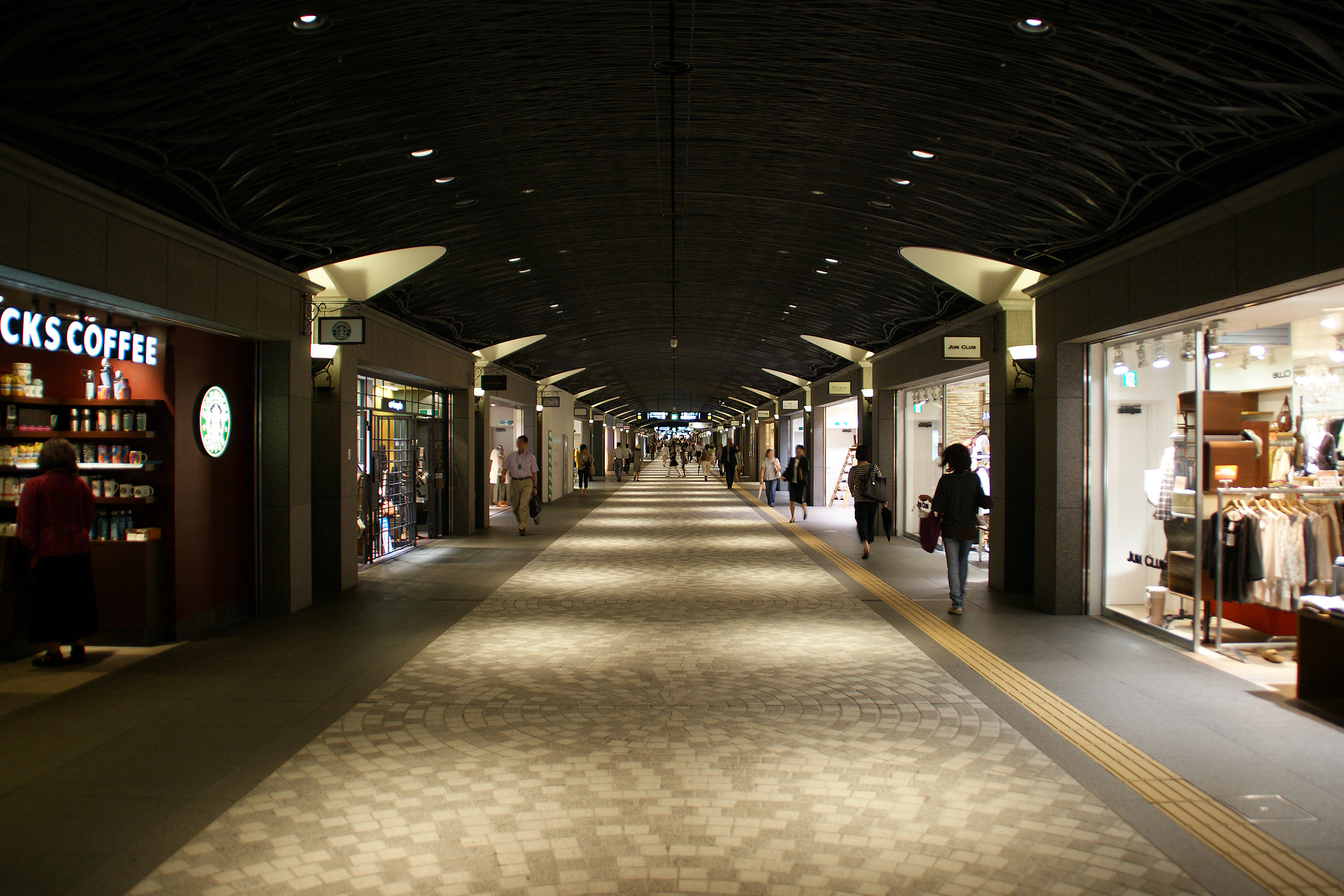
Tenjin Underground City in Chūō-ku, Fukuoka, Fukuoka Prefecture, Japan

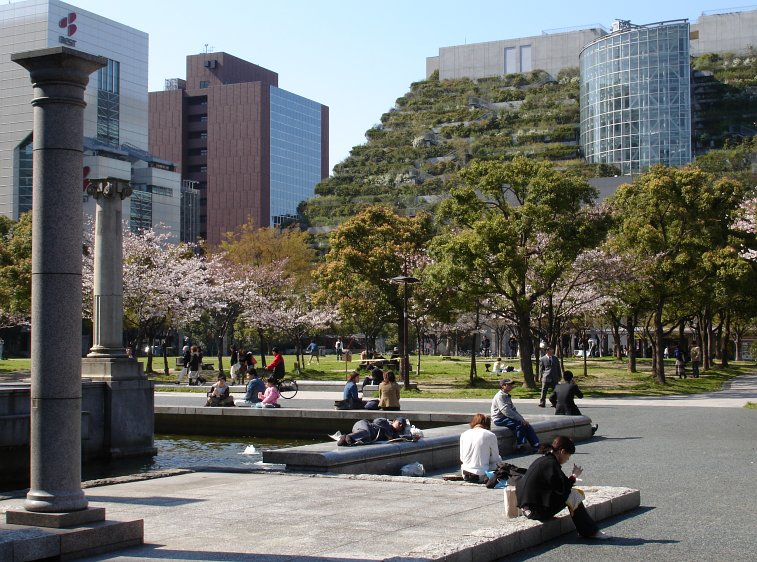
ACROS Fukuoka

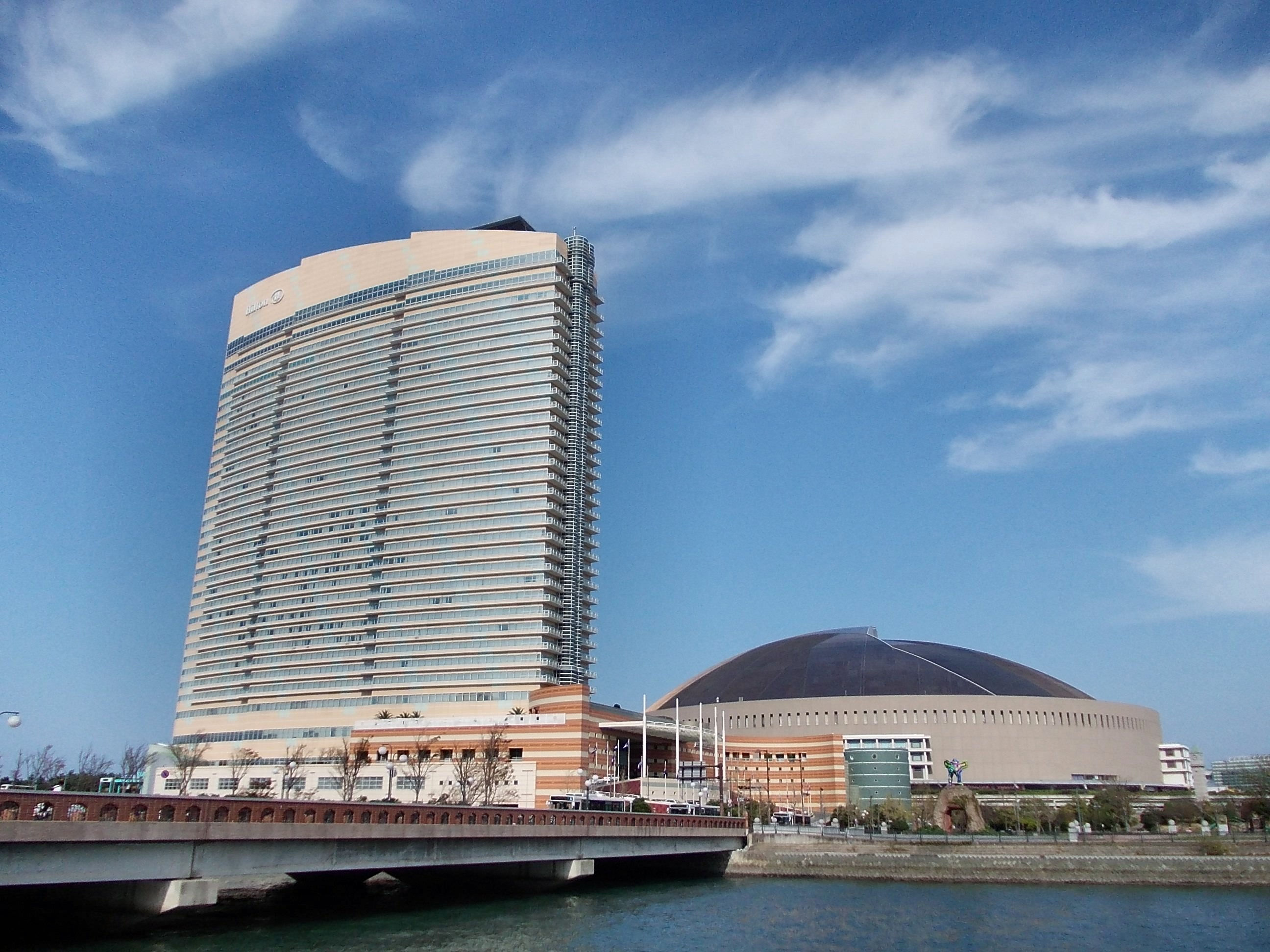
Hilton Fukuoka Sea Hawk (left) and Fukuoka Yafuoku! Dome (right)

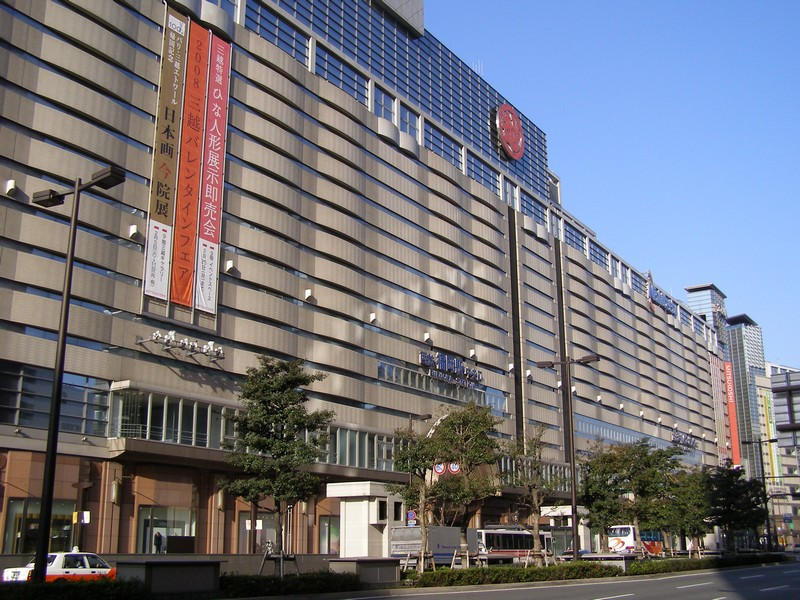
Tenjin

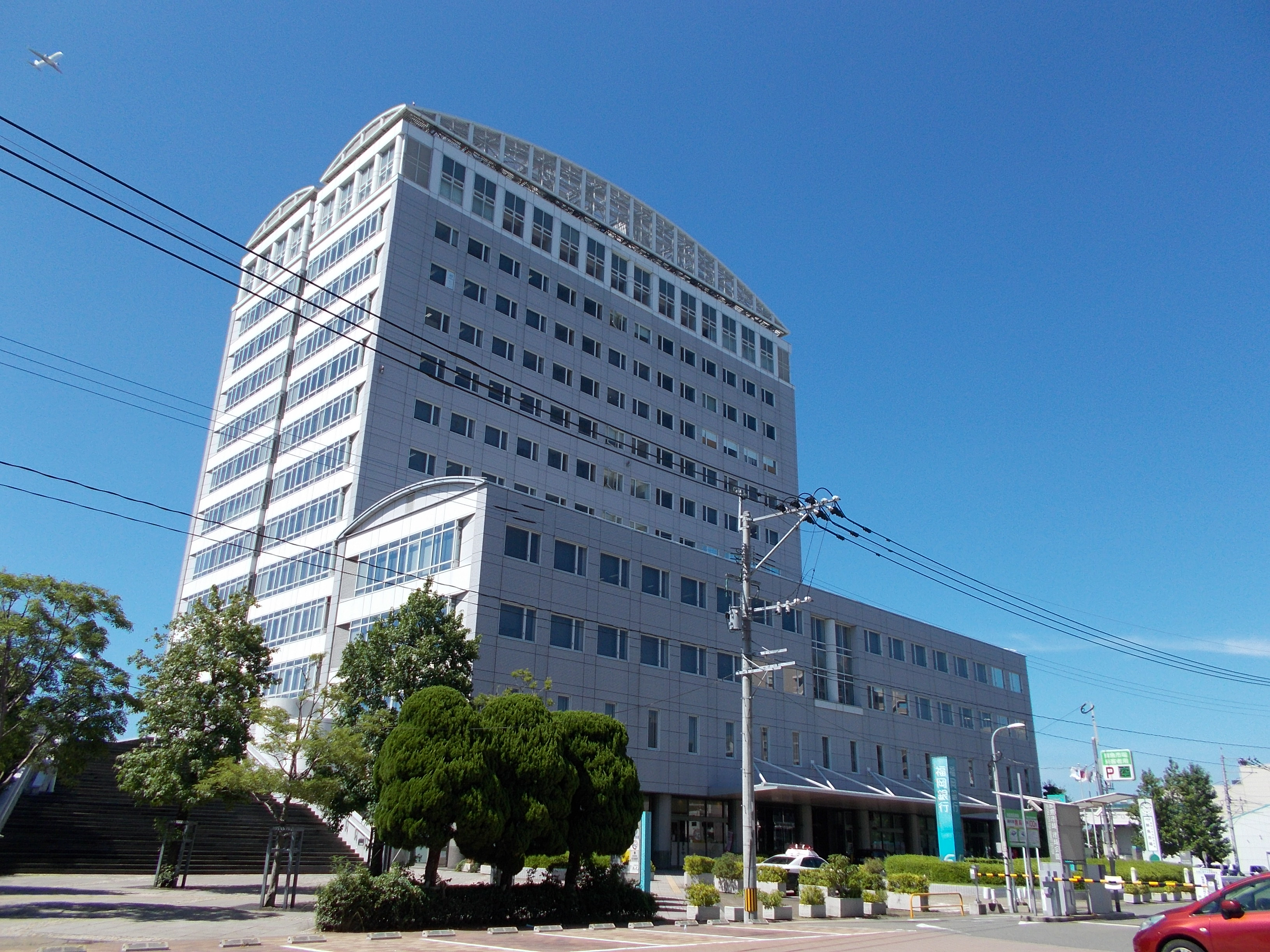
Fukuoka City Fish Market Center

== See also ==
- Airport Line (Fukuoka)
- Nanakuma Line
- Tenjin Omuta Line
- Love FM (Japan)
- Nakasu
- Kōki Hirota
- Fukuoka Japan Temple of the LDS Church
- New Otani Hotels
