= River Line =

River Line may refer to:

== Transportation ==
- River Line (Atlanta), the last Atlanta, Georgia streetcar line, which ceased operation in 1949
- River Line (Conrail), a rail corridor in New Jersey and New York
- River Line (NJ Transit), a light rail line between Trenton and Camden, New Jersey
- Riverline (Hobart), a 2007 proposal for a light rail project in Hobart, Australia
- Jubilee line of the London Underground, for which a 1973 proposed extension was known as the River line.

== Other ==
- River trace, the line of a river
- Riverbed, the line of a river
- River Line (East Sussex), a Site of Special Scientific Interest in East Sussex, England
- Riverline (development), a 2016 planned development in Chicago
- The River Line, a 1964 West German film

== See also ==
- River (disambiguation)
- Line (disambiguation)
