= Lincoln Yards Stadium =

- Interactive map of Lincoln Yards Stadium
- Location: Chicago, Illinois
- Coordinates: 41.914833°N 87.661055°W
- Owner: Sterling Bay
- Operator: Sterling Bay
- Capacity: 20,000
- Surface: grass

Tenants
- USL Chicago (USLC) (2021–)

Lincoln Yards Stadium was the working name for a planned 20,000-seat soccer stadium to house the future Chicago team in the USL Championship.

Plans for the stadium, which was to sit on the west side of the North branch of the Chicago River, include a retractable roof in order to host other sporting, entertainment and cultural events. The stadium would be part of a massive $5 billion, 70-acre (28 ha) mixed-use development project, to include apartments, condos, office, retail and entertainment. The development was also a proposed site in Chicago's unsuccessful bid for Amazon's second headquarters.

In January 2019, plans for the stadium were dropped after not receiving political support.
