= Southbank, Chicago =

Southbank
- Interactive map of Southbank
- Coordinates: 41°52′21.4″N 87°38′2.3″W
- Status: Under construction
- Groundbreaking: 2016

Companies
- Developer: Lendlease

Southbank is a multi-building urban redevelopment project in South Loop, Chicago. It is located on the South Branch of the Chicago River directly west of Printers Row. The residential developments include buildings named The Reed, The Cooper, The Grand Central, and two currently unnamed future buildings of over 40 stories each.

== History ==
Developed by Lendlease the site was originally part of a larger development, dubbed "Riverline" built by a partnership between Chicago-based developer CMK and Lendlease but the partnership was dissolved in early 2018. Southbank neighbors the other descendant project, Riverline, which retained the original name.

Groundbreaking occurred in 2016 when the partnership between CMK and Lendlease had not been dissolved yet. The development is north of The 78, a vacant South Loop area that had been plannd for large-scale development.

In October 2018 the first residential building in the complex allowed tenants to move in. The building was originally known as Ancora at Riverline, but has been renamed The Cooper at Southbank.

== See also ==
- The 78
- Riverline
- Foundry Park
