= Lincoln Yards (development) =

Proposed development in Chicago, Illinois

- Interactive map of Lincoln Yards
- Location: Chicago
- Coordinates: 41.916214°N 87.659574°W
- Website: Official website

Companies
- Architect: Skidmore, Owings & Merrill
- Developer: Sterling Bay

Technical details
- Cost: US$6 billion
- Size: 53 acres (21 ha)

Lincoln Yards was a proposed mixed-use mega-development project on the North Side of Chicago between the Lincoln Park and Bucktown neighborhoods. Lincoln Yards was intended to occupy more than 50 acres (20 ha) of land on both sides of the North Branch of the Chicago River, bounded by Webster Avenue to the north, Clybourn Avenue to the east, North Avenue to the south, and the Kennedy Expressway to the west.

Plans included several towers and high-rises for apartments, condos, office, retail, and entertainment. With office space twice that of the Sears Tower, the megadevelopment was planned to include a total of 14.5 million square feet of buildings.

The ambitious development suffered slow progress, and eventually the plans were scrapped. Sterling Bay surrendered the northern section of the land to the financing lender, and it was renamed Foundry Park and developed as a residential enclave of less than 3,000 units. The southern section remained controlled by Sterling Bay and J.P. Morgan Asset Management.

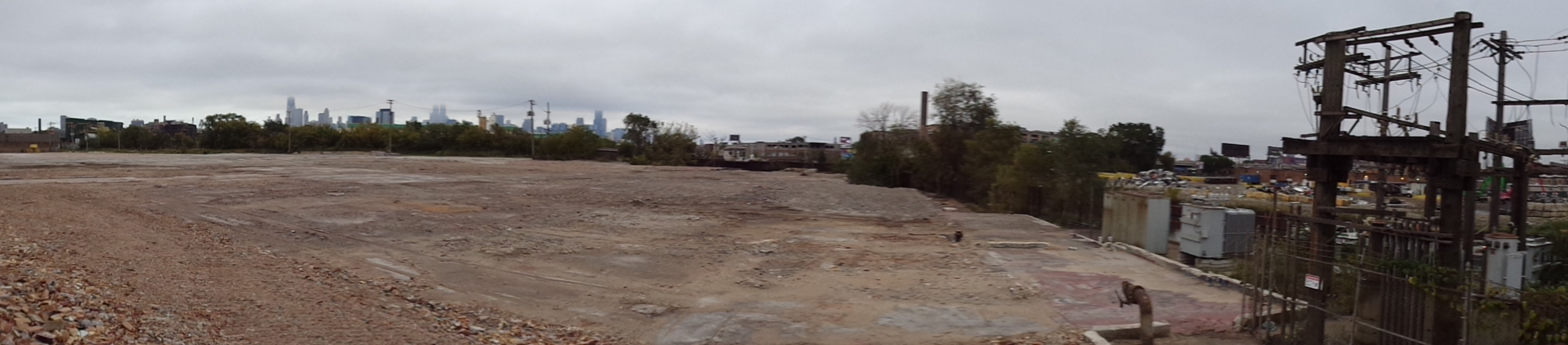
Panorama of the Old Finkl Steel Plant in 2015

== History ==
A. Finkl & Sons Steel operated a mill along a roughly 22-acre lot along the eastern portion of the Chicago River in the Lincoln Park neighborhood from 1902 until it was demolished in 2012. The Lincoln Park location was Chicago's oldest steel mill. In 2006, it bought the site of the former Verson Steel on Chicago's South Side. It was purchased by a German company in 2008, and has since operated from that location. Since the demolition, there have been various proposals to connect the site to the popular Bloomingdale Trail.

In 2016, real estate developer company Sterling Bay purchased the Lincoln Park site for a sum over $100 million and renamed the site "Lincoln Yards". The developer released plans designed by Chicago-based architectural firm Skidmore, Owings, and Merrill in July 2018. In exchange for an increase in density to allow for the substantial construction, Sterling Bay is to pay an $89 million fee and will make infrastructure improvements in the neighborhood to ease the increase in traffic. Sterling Bay estimates the entire development will take up to ten years to complete when construction begins.

The development was to also include a stadium and a concert venue. Thomas Ricketts, owner of the Chicago Cubs, owns a stake in the stadium. A Live Nation music venue was also proposed. Some local residents indicated they did not want a stadium or a venue. In early 2019, a Chicago alderman suggested that the development include more parkland and green space instead.

The site was one of the proposed locations that could have hosted the second headquarters of Amazon if the company had chosen Chicago. Amazon representatives toured the site in 2017. Amazon ultimately split their proposal in half between two other locations.

Revised plans, released in January 2019, no longer included the stadium but instead incorporated more green space, roughly doubling the amount of space previously dedicated to parks. Ten aldermen out of the city's 50 aldermen declared their opposition to financing the revised project with $900 million of tax increment financing, arguing that more affordable housing should be provided on-site. However, with these changes to the plan, the development moved forward.

In April 2019, Mayor-elect Lori Lightfoot told the Chicago Sun-Times that her staff would, during her first post-election weekend, spend time examining the city's 600-page agreement with Sterling Bay regarding the development, believing that the city could reach a better deal. Later that month the Chicago City Council approved plans for Lincoln Yards, including a tax increment financing agreement.

In 2019, a lawsuit filed against using over 1.3 billion dollars of TIF funds to pay for the development was filed but was unsuccessful.

In 2019, then-Mayor Lightfoot announced that an advisory council may monitor the site and proposed developments.

As of July 2023, the development of Lincoln Yards was significantly behind schedule. The life sciences building was the only building that had been completed. A spokesperson for Sterling Bay said that the company was seeking new investors in the project.

Both of the initial investors in Lincoln Yards, J.P. Morgan Asset Management and Lone Star Funds, have announced plans to sell their stakes in Lincoln Yards at a discount and record a significant loss on the stalled development.

Sterling Bay has completed construction of only one building in its $6 billion mega-development, the Ally life sciences building at 1229 W. Concord Place but that building, which was completed in 2023, has yet to attract any tenants as of January 2025. Sterling Bay recently announced plans to sell another life science building near the site.

In June 2023, Sterling Bay approached the Chicago Teachers’ Union Pension fund to discuss a financing deal that would “bail out Lincoln Yards…inflict hefty losses on the original backers (J.P. Morgan Asset Management and Lone Star Funds)…and offer the developer a lifeline.” The approach to the Union Pension Fund was seen as a long-shot since members of the teachers' union “have been among the most vocal opponents of Lincoln Yards.” During the 2019 Chicago teachers’ strike, union members protested at the development site and released a statement which read, in part, “We are targeting Lincoln Yards because it’s being funded in part by TIF (Tax Increment Financing) money that should be going to our schools.”

In August 2023, the Teachers’ Pension Fund declined to finance the development.

In the summer of 2023, Sterling Bay announced that it would commence work on the “Steelyard” portion of the Lincoln Yards project later that year. It was to include two buildings, 1665 Throop Street and 1687 Throop Street, with groundbreaking for additional buildings to commence on a rolling basis. As of January 2025, no work has commenced on any of the planned buildings, suggesting the financial strain on Sterling Bay is critical.

In April 2024, Sterling Bay put three properties next to the planned Lincoln Yards development up for sale “as it stares down an imminent deadline to pay off debt.” The effort to sell the properties was seen as an attempt by Sterling Bay to “navigate a financial storm” related to Lincoln Yards.

In October 2024, Bank OZK, a lender to Lincoln Yards, took a loss of $20.8 million by writing down the value of its loan to a subsidiary of Lincoln Yards after “growing less patient” with Sterling Bay's progress. Bank OZK moved the remaining debt to a “more critical status.”

At a public meeting hosted by Sterling Bay on January 15, 2025, many supporters of Sterling Bay's proposed developments in the area complained that the entire Lincoln Yards property west of Clybourn Avenue is “blighted.” One participant described the abandoned development an “open wound.”

In March 2025, Sterling Bay surrendered the northern portion of Lincoln Yards to Bank OZK.

== Foundry Park ==
In July 2025, JDL Development and Kayne Anderson Real Estate announced that they would acquire the 31-acre (13 ha) northern section of the former Lincoln Yards development site, including the old Finkl Steel property on Cortland Street along the Chicago River. The developers announced an intent to close on the sale by September 2025. They plan to develop the site into a residential neighborhood named Foundry Park, using the address 2001 N. Southport Ave. for the overall project. Foundry Park is planned to be a walking neighborhood with tree-lined, low-traffic streets and new open green space that abuts the Chicago River and offers four-season recreation. It is expected that about 20% of the residential units at Foundry Park will be marketed as affordable housing. The planned project includes apartment towers of around 30 stories, but mostly buildings under 20 stories and also single-family homes.

== See also ==
- Tax-increment financing
