= Hermosa, Chicago =

Community area in Chicago, Illinois

Hermosa Hermosa
- Community area
- Community area 20 - Hermosa
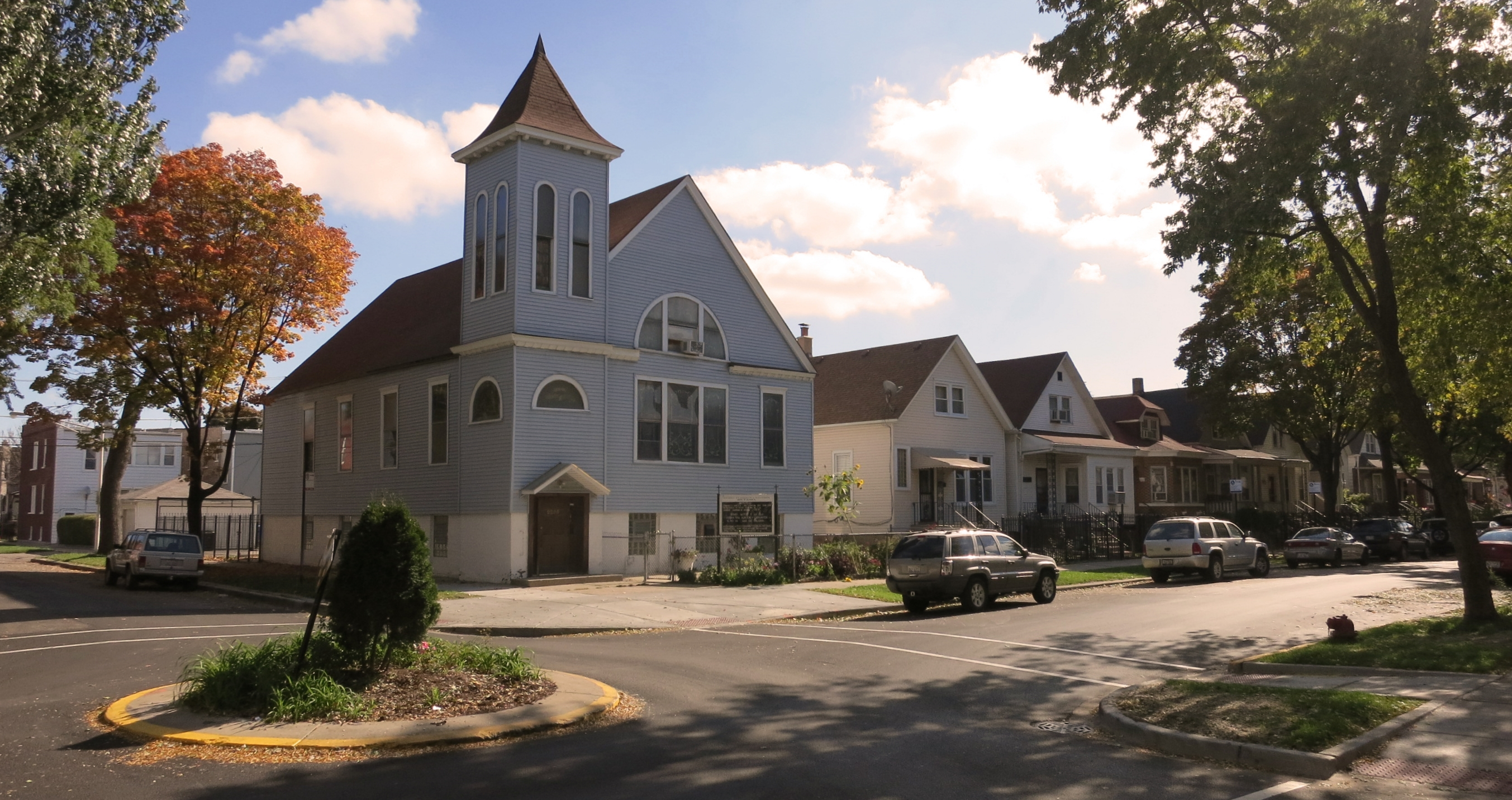
- This Hermosa church is where Walt Disney was baptized.

- Location within the city of Chicago
- Coordinates: 41°55.2′N 87°43.8′W
- Country: United States
- States: Illinois
- County: Cook
- City: Chicago
- Neighborhoods: List: Hermosa; Kelvyn Park

Area
  - Total: 1.17 sq mi (3.03 km^{2})

Population (2024)
  - Total: 22,576
  - Density: 19,300/sq mi (7,450/km^{2})

Demographics 2024
  - White: 9.8%
  - Black: 3.0%
  - Hispanic: 84.9%
  - Asian: 1.3%
  - Other: 1.1%
- Time zone: UTC-6 (CST)
  - Summer (DST): UTC-5 (CDT)
- ZIP Codes: parts of 60639, 60641, 60647
- Median household income: $66,073
- Source: U.S. Census, Record Information Services; American Community Survey, five-year estimates.

Hermosa is one of the 77 community areas of Chicago in Illinois, United States, located on the northwest side of Chicago. It contains the Kelvyn Park and Hermosa neighborhoods. The area includes the birthplace of Walt Disney and is the former headquarters of the Schwinn Bicycle Company. While being one of the smaller community areas, Hermosa is one of the city's most densely populated neighborhoods.

Today, Hermosa is a predominantly Hispanic blue collar community, with a sizable manufacturing base. Many of the people who reside in Hermosa have done so because of its convenient location to work, its relative proximity to downtown, and because of its healthy public transportation options. The Consulate-General of Honduras in Chicago is located in Hermosa at 4439 West Fullerton Avenue.

On December 31, 2018, the Hermosa Bungalow Historic District was added to the National Register of Historic Places.

== Background ==
The Hermosa area originated as one of the many suburban crabgrass communities of Jefferson Township. The first verifiable proof of European settlement in the area occurred in the early 1880s after railroads were constructed through the area. In 1872, an extension of the Chicago and Pacific Rail Road was extended, passing through Hermosa from east to west. One of the first settlers was named Mr. Lathman, who built his house in the spring of 1882. In the same year, James F. Keeney, who owned much of the land that now comprises Hermosa, started building a number of houses within his subdivision. In 1884, the first large scale successful industrial enterprise, the Laminated Wood Company, was founded. In 1886 several other factories were also established such as the Expanded Metal Company, the Eclipse Furnace Company, and a warehouse belonging to the Washburn and Moen Manufacturing Company. The Keeney Company actively promoted the growth of Hermosa and ultimately helped convince the railroad to build a station in the area, which Mr. Kenney constructed at his own expense. By 1884, there were 30 houses and 150 people living in Hermosa, most of these original settlers were Scotch, German and Swedish immigrants. The first schools and churches were established in the area in the late 1880s and 1890s.

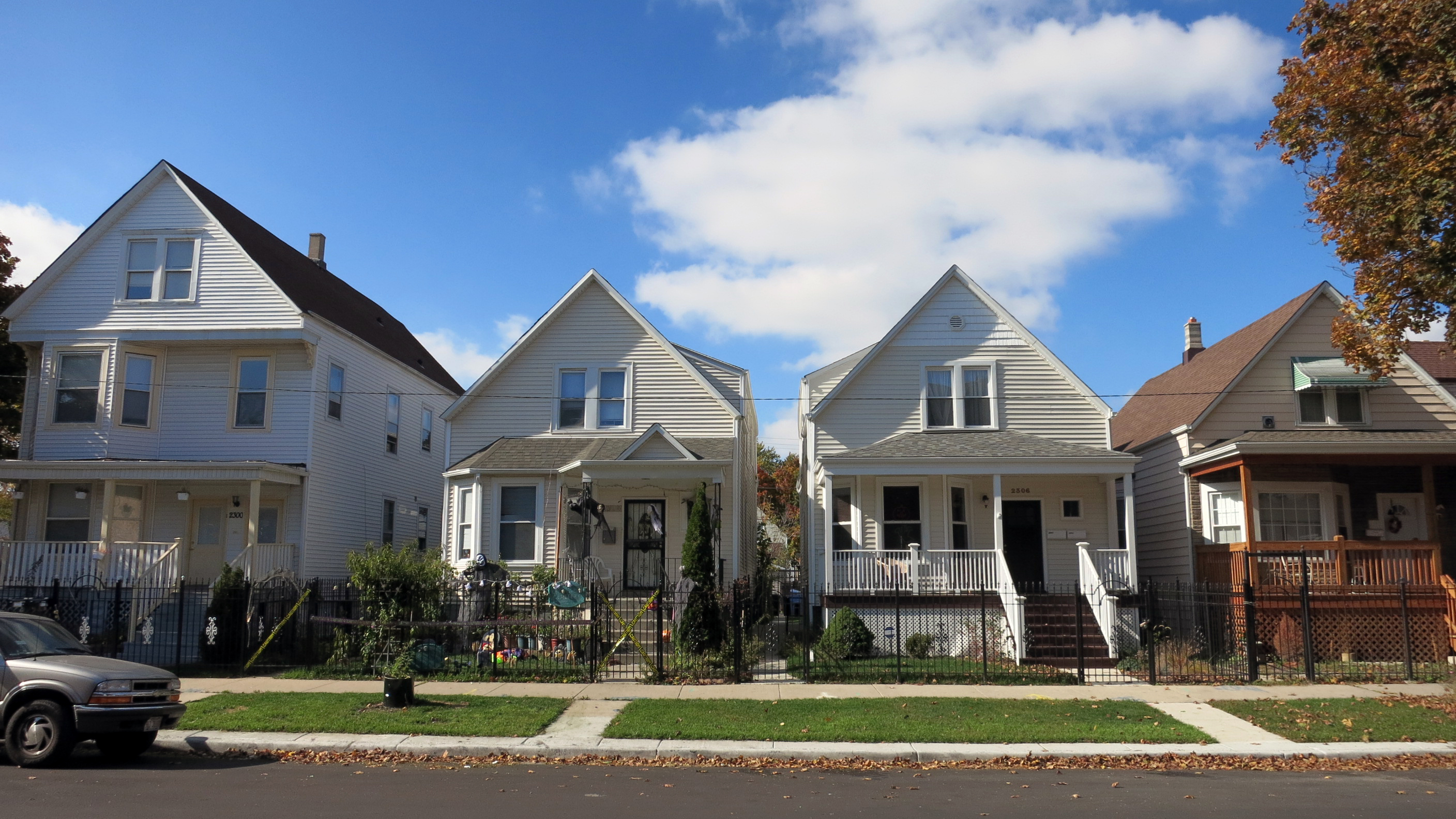
A typical block in Hermosa

The first name for Hermosa was likely "Pacific," but there is no verifiable record to prove this. The first official name for the area was Garfield, in honor of the late president. In 1885 the name of the town was changed to Hermosa for the reason of establishing a post office at Kenney's rail station—there already was a post office named Garfield and the name could not be duplicated. A Mr. Peebles, secretary to the superintendent of the Chicago, Milwaukee and St. Paul Rail Road, is credited with suggesting the name Hermosa, which means beautiful in Spanish.

In the fall of 1889, Hermosa was annexed into the City of Chicago. The area grew slowly throughout the remainder of the 19th century and was mostly characterized by the construction of simple worker's cottages, but began to see rapid growth in the first two decades of the 20th century. Streetcars were extended through the community along Armitage Avenue in 1895, Fullerton Avenue in 1914, and Belmont Avenue in 1917. The Hermosa Improvement Association was organized in 1912 for the purpose of securing needed improvements including a park. The organization is primarily responsible for the establishment of Hermosa Park. By 1920 Hermosa had swelled to over 15,000 residents. Hermosa went through a building boom during this decade; most of the area neighborhood of Kelvyn Park was built out during this decade and was composed mostly of brick bungalows and two-flats. In addition, the remaining open land in southern Hermosa was built out and filled with brick bungalows, two- and three-flats, and smaller 5+ unit apartment buildings. With Hermosa being surrounded by railroad tracks on three sides, industrial development continued to occur along these railroad tracks and along industrial spurs throughout the 1920s. One of the more notable industrial players was the Schwinn Bicycle Company, which had its headquarters and manufacturing base in Hermosa at 1718 N. Kildare Ave. & 1856 N. Kostner Ave, respectively. Schwinn had facilities in Hermosa from 1895 to 1982. The railroads also created many dead-end streets in Hermosa, which isolated residents geographically from surrounding communities, but also created a sense of security. By the end of the 1920s, Hermosa's infrastructure and building stock was nearly completely built out, representing much of the community as it exists today. Indeed, the average median age of a home in Hermosa (in 2012) dates back to 1919, with nearly 63% of the structures in the community having been built before 1940.

Historical population
Census	Pop.	Note	%±
1920	15,152		—
1930	23,605		55.8%
1940	22,894		−3.0%
1950	22,805		−0.4%
1960	21,429		−6.0%
1970	19,838		−7.4%
1980	19,547		−1.5%
1990	23,131		18.3%
2000	26,908		16.3%
2010	25,010		−7.1%
2020	24,062		−3.8%

By the 1930s Hermosa's population had grown to over 23,500 residents. The area was populated primarily by Germans, Scandinavians with newer groups of Poles, Hungarians, and Austrians. After an expansive period, Hermosa's population began to decline, most prominently in the 1950s and 1960s. By the 1960s, Puerto Ricans had become the largest ethnicity in the area. By 1980, the population had decreased below 20,000 with over a third of the population being Hispanic. In 1980, Hermosa was still principally a white community of mostly older Polish, German and Irish ethnicities. The decade of the 1980s proved to be a monumental one for Hermosa, however, transforming the area into a mostly Hispanic community.

In the 1980s, Hermosa’ population swelled dramatically and the ethnic composition shifted radically, changing from one-thirds Hispanic to two-thirds Hispanic by the end of the decade. Puerto Ricans remained the largest ethnic group, with a large Mexican community also establishing roots in the area. Most of the Hispanic population growth was concentrated in the areas south of Fullerton during the 1980s. The average size of households jumped dramatically in this decade, with large increases in the population of children 13 years or younger. Total population increased by 3,500 in the 1980s. Families in poverty increased during this time with a 17.4% poverty rate in 1989 and an unemployment rate of 10.9% in 1990. The percentage of overcrowded housing doubled in Hermosa to more than 10% (up from 4%). The housing situation deteriorated starting in the 1970s-1980s, with Hermosa having the second lowest number of housing repairs among the 77 communities. The first appearance of gang violence also appeared in Hermosa in the 1980s. Several organizations were created during this time including the United Neighbors in Action (1982) which primarily fought against a proposed increase in subsidized housing in the area. Neighbors joined to stop crime and gang violence. The Kelvyn Ken-Well Community Organization and the Hermosa Community Organization were two successful community organizations created during this time to combat crime. In 1992, nearly 800 neighbors marched from Kelvyn Park to Hanson Park to protest the continued presence of gangs.

The sustained increases in population helped Hermosa reach an all-time historical high of nearly 27,000 residents in 2000, making Hermosa one of the most densely populated neighborhoods in Chicago at the time. By 2000, Hermosa had become 84% Hispanic, up from 68% in 1990. Issues of overcrowding and gang violence started to subside in the 1990s.

While Hermosa's housing stock remained mostly buildings built prior to the 1940s many renovations and rehabs have occurred which have improved the housing stock in recent decades. In recent years Hermosa has seen some gentrification as surrounding areas, such as Logan Square and Avondale, have started to see rising housing prices and business activity. Hermosa is among the top 10 Chicago communities with the fastest increasing housing prices, with home prices having increased 33% since 2012–2014.

== Demographics ==
Per the 2020 Census, there were 24,062 people residing in the Hermosa community area. Per the 2018–2022 American Community Survey five-year estimates, the racial makeup of the Hermosa community area was 12.4% non-Hispanic White, 3.5% non-Hispanic Black, 3.0% non-Hispanic Asian, and 1.1% non-Hispanic some other race. Hispanic or Latino of any race were 80.1% of the population.

UIC's Gentrification Index classifies the Hermosa community area as a geographic region that has experienced ‘moderate decline’ over the period 1970 to 2010.

== Neighborhood boundaries ==
Located 6 miles northwest of the Loop, Hermosa's borders are mostly defined by railroad tracks and embankments. The Metra Milwaukee District / West Line forms Hermosa's southernmost border, at Bloomingdale Ave (1800 N). The westernmost border is Cicero Ave. (4800 W.) while the easternmost is the Metra Milwaukee District / North Line. Hermosa's northernmost border is Belmont Ave (3200 N.) Zip codes: 60639, 60641, and 60647.

=== Hermosa ===
While Hermosa is the namesake for the general community area, Hermosa as a community is generally defined as being the tract of land south of Fullerton (2400 N) to Bloomingdale Ave (1800 N), west of the Milwaukee District/North Line, and east of Cicero Ave (4800 W). Zip codes: 60639, 60647. Unofficially, Hermosa is generally recognized as bounded by the land north of North Ave (1600 N) and west of Pulaski Ave (4000 W).

=== Kelvyn Park ===
Kelvyn Park's boundaries are north of Fullerton Ave (2400 N) to Belmont Ave (3200 N), west of the Milwaukee District/North Line, and east of Cicero Ave (4800 W). ZIP codes: 60639, 60641.

Hermosa Cityscape

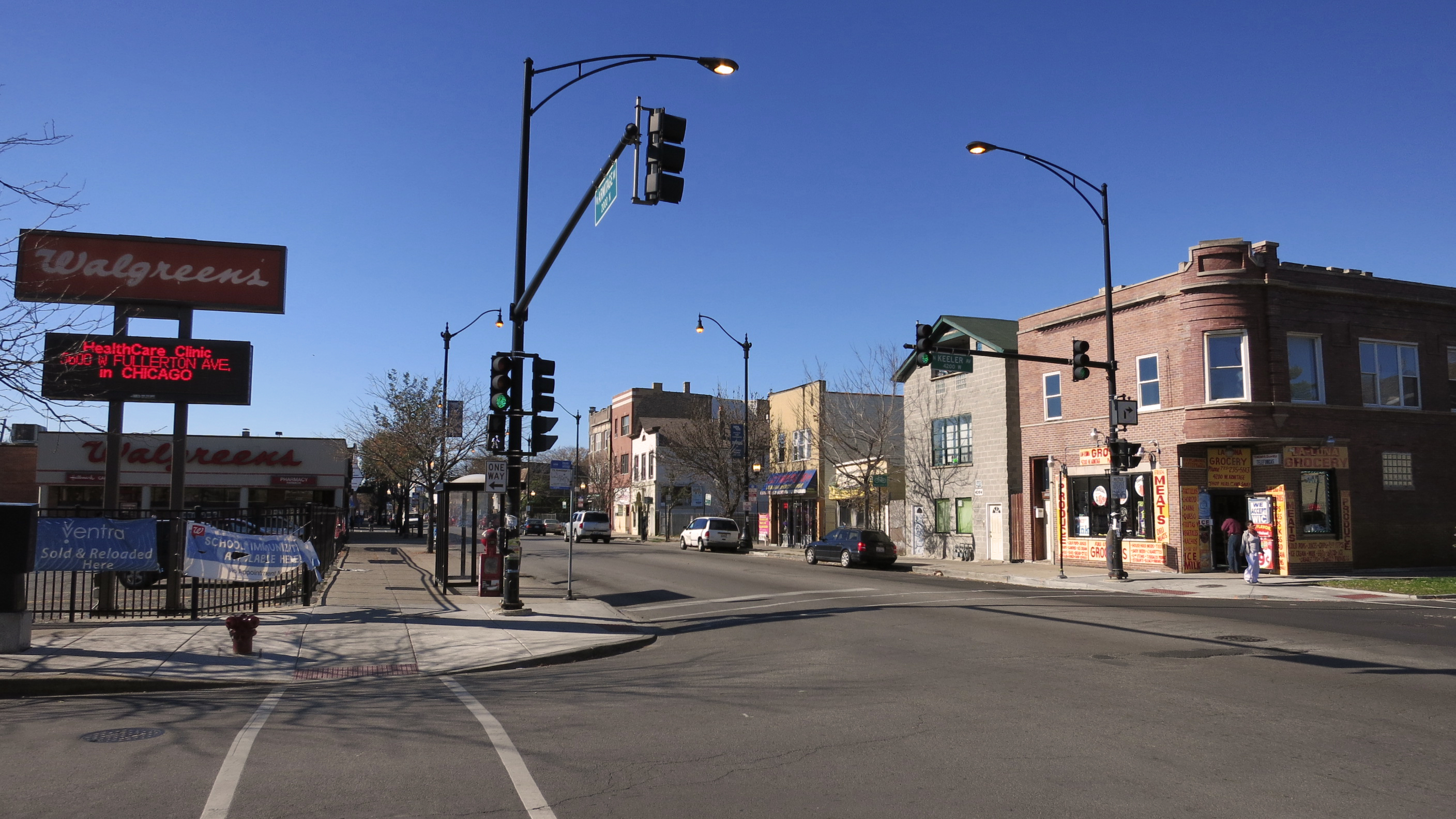
Armitage Ave. is an important business corridor in Hermosa.

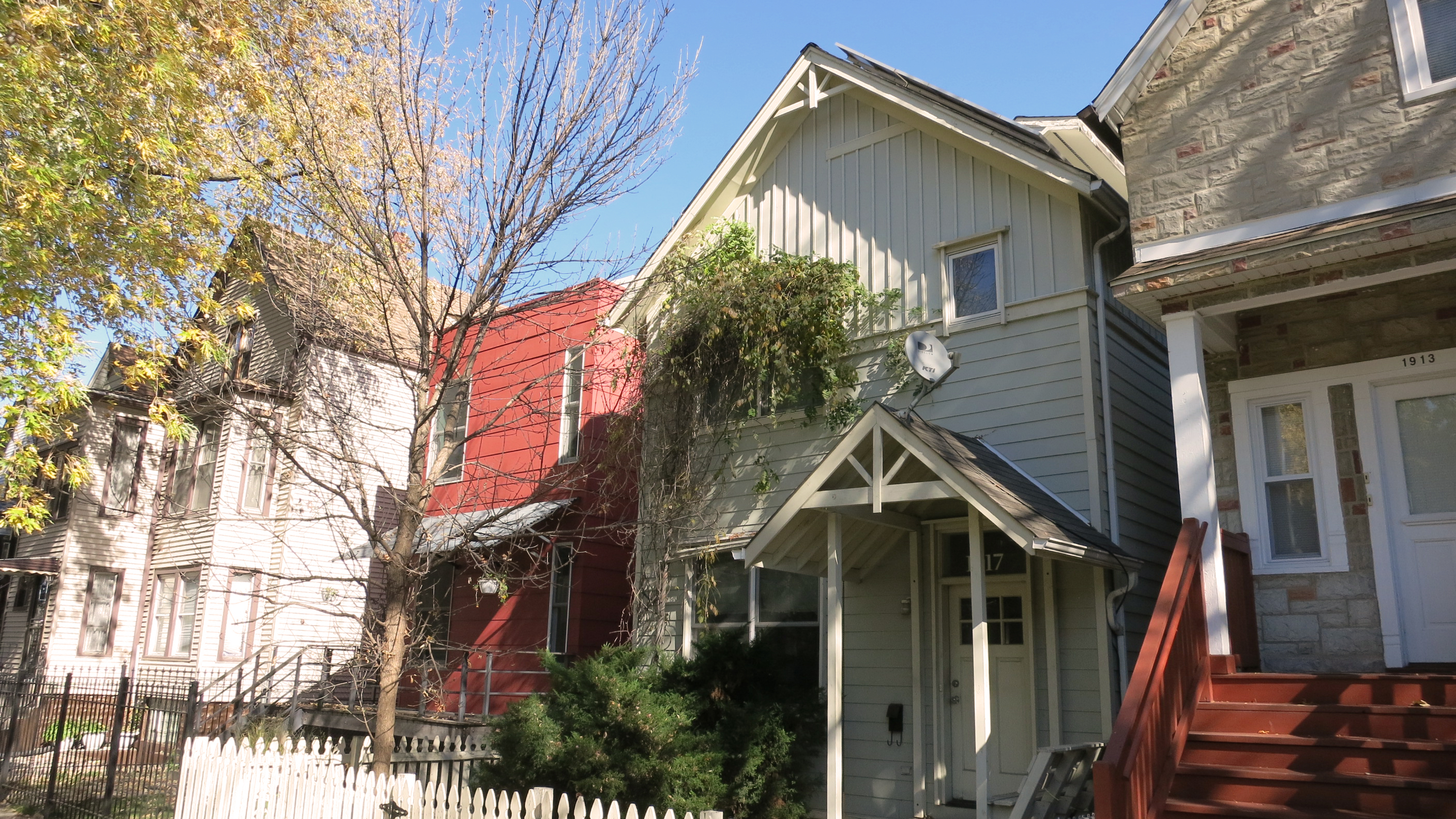
The Factor 10 house (red house pictured) is located in Hermosa and was named a top 10 Green Projects by the American Institute of Architects.

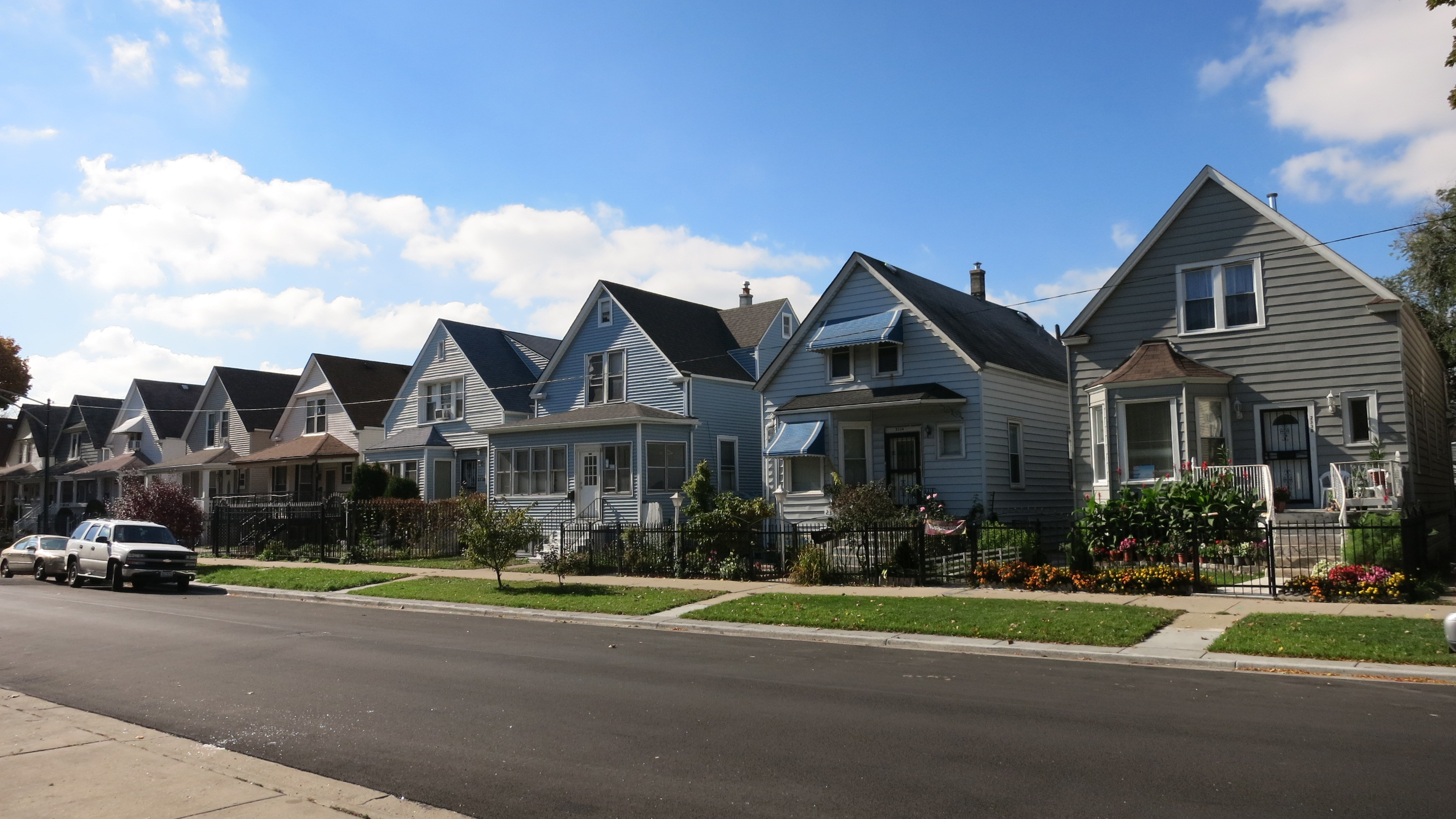
Many homes in Hermosa are late 19th century simple worker's cottages.

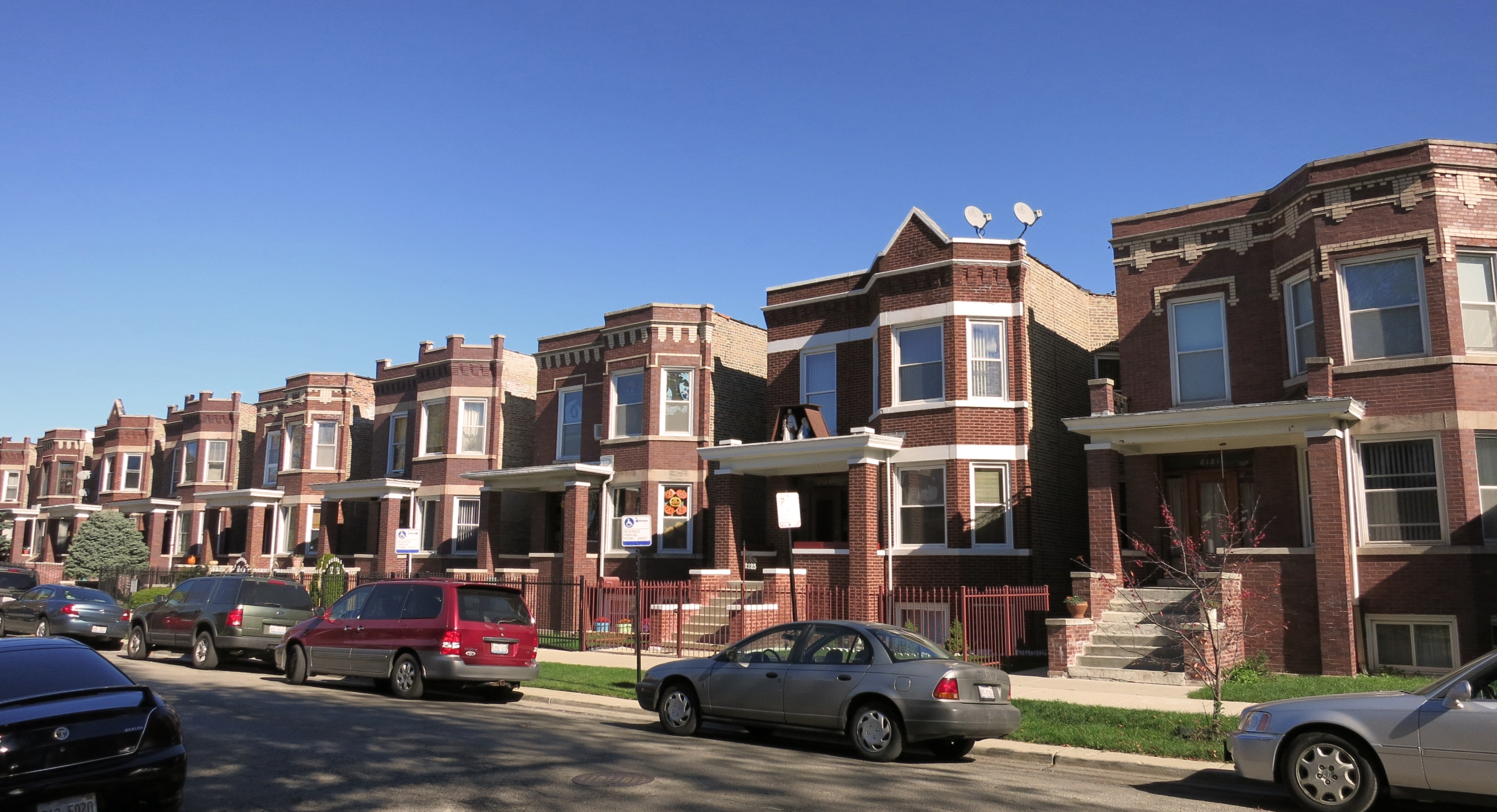
A series of 2-flats located on Keystone Ave. near Palmer Ave. in Hermosa.

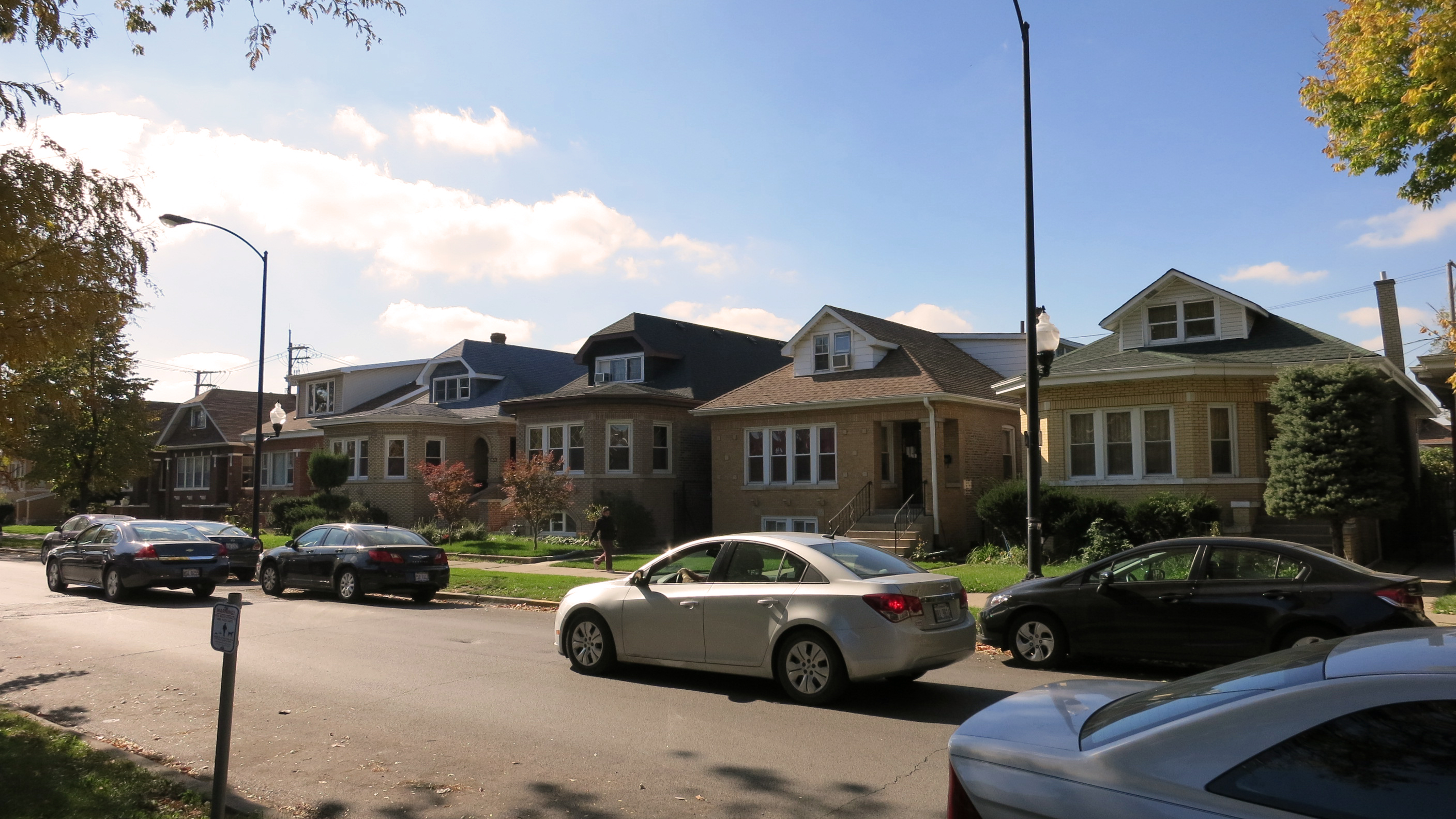
Kelvyn Park (pictured) was mostly built out during the 1920s-1940s and is composed mostly of brick bungalows and two-flats.

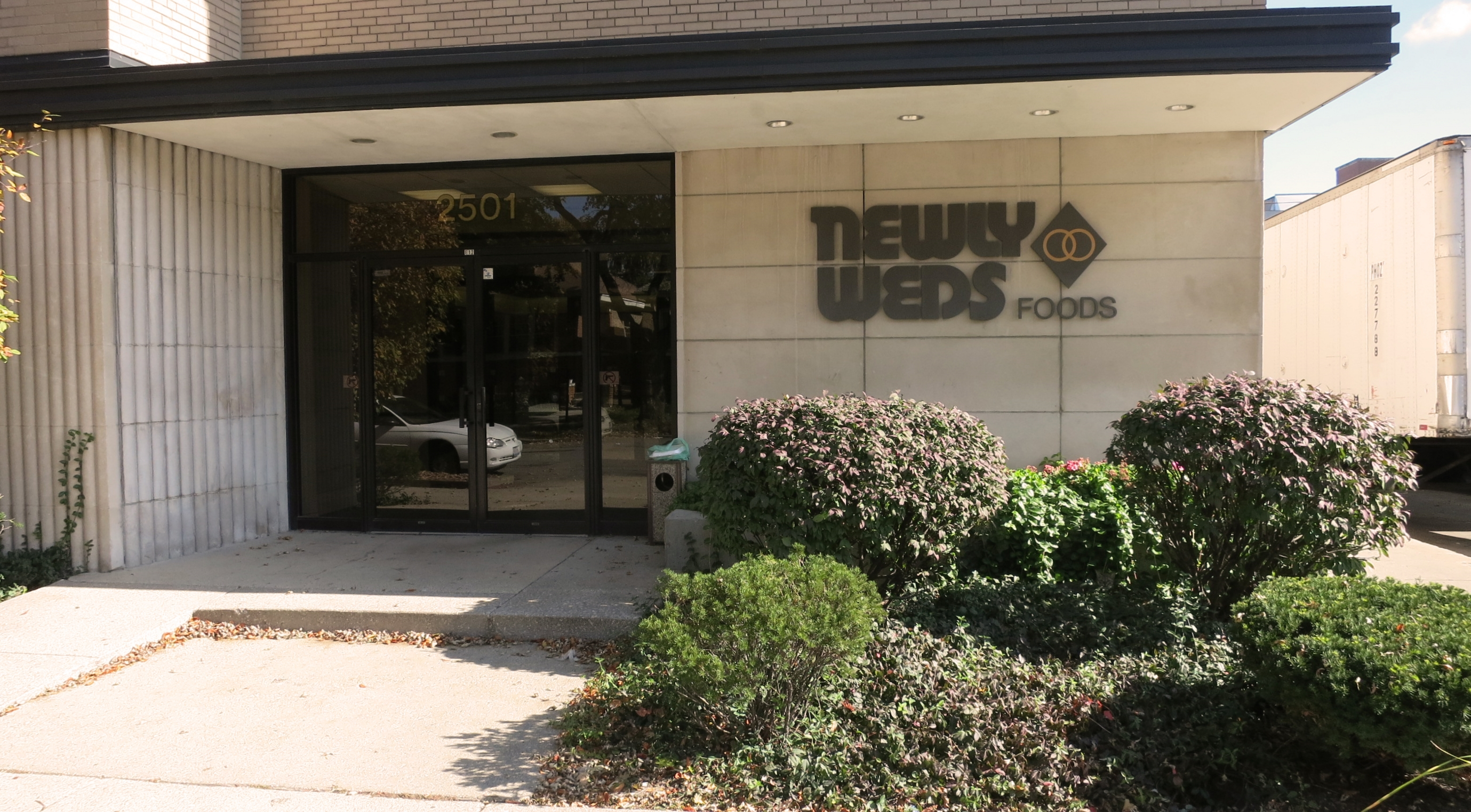
Newly Weds Foods Inc. is one of the larger property owners and employers in Hermosa.

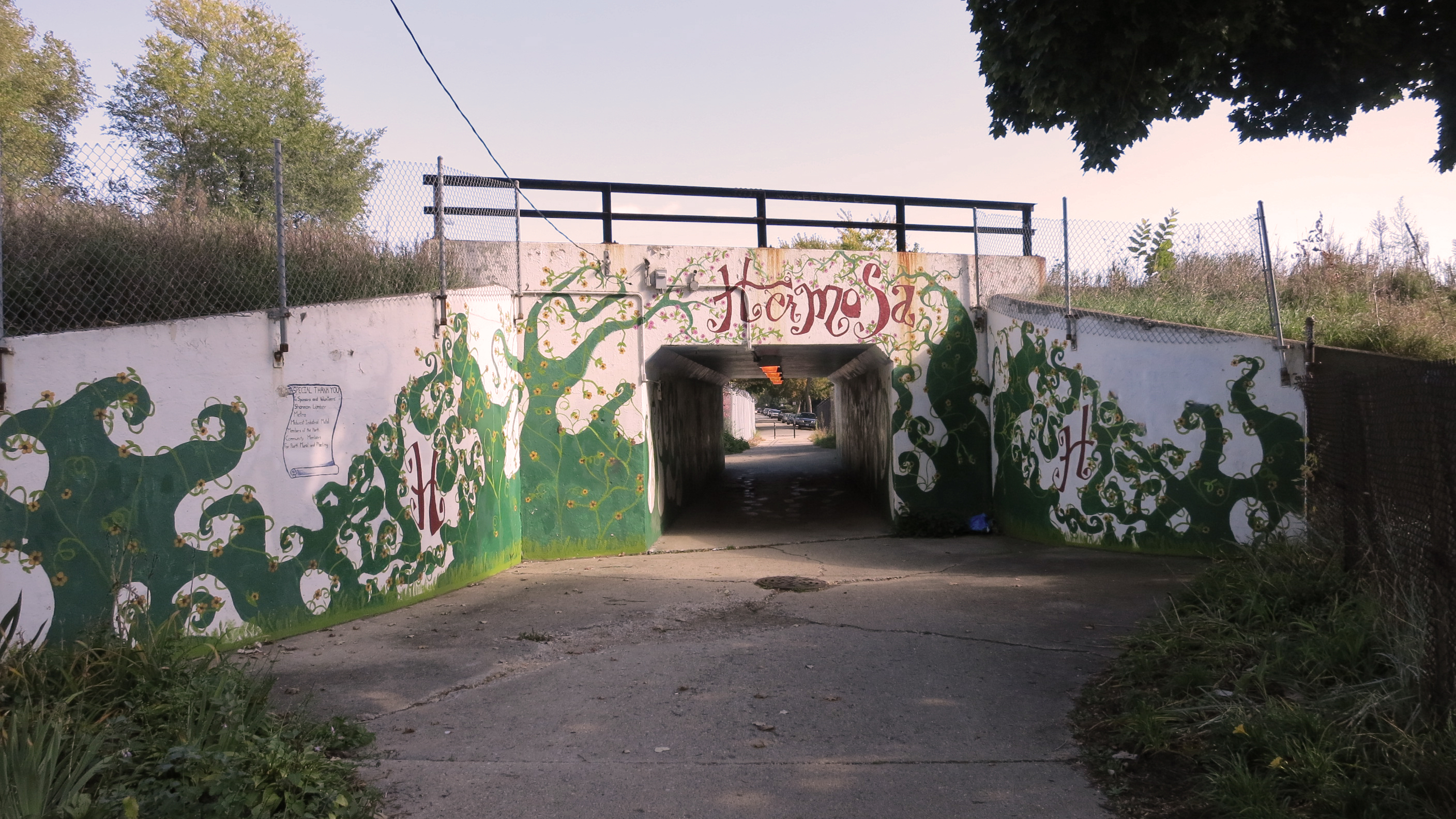
A painted viaduct located near Ken-Well Park.

=== Aldermanic wards ===
As of 2014, the majority of Hermosa was located within the boundaries of the 31st ward and the 30th ward. A controversial aldermanic remap has left the Hermosa community area relegated to 4 wards; with the majority of the community still located within the 31st Ward'. Hermosa is also located within the 35th ward, 26th ward, and 36th ward starting in 2015. The aldermanic remap has left the Hermosa community area politically fractured.

=== Police district and beats ===
Hermosa is located within the 25th District Chicago Police Department and is located within 8 CAPS District and Beat locations:

- Beat 2521
- Beat 2522
- Beat 2523
- Beat 2524
- Beat 2525
- Beat 2533
- Beat 2534
- Beat 2535

== Notable people ==
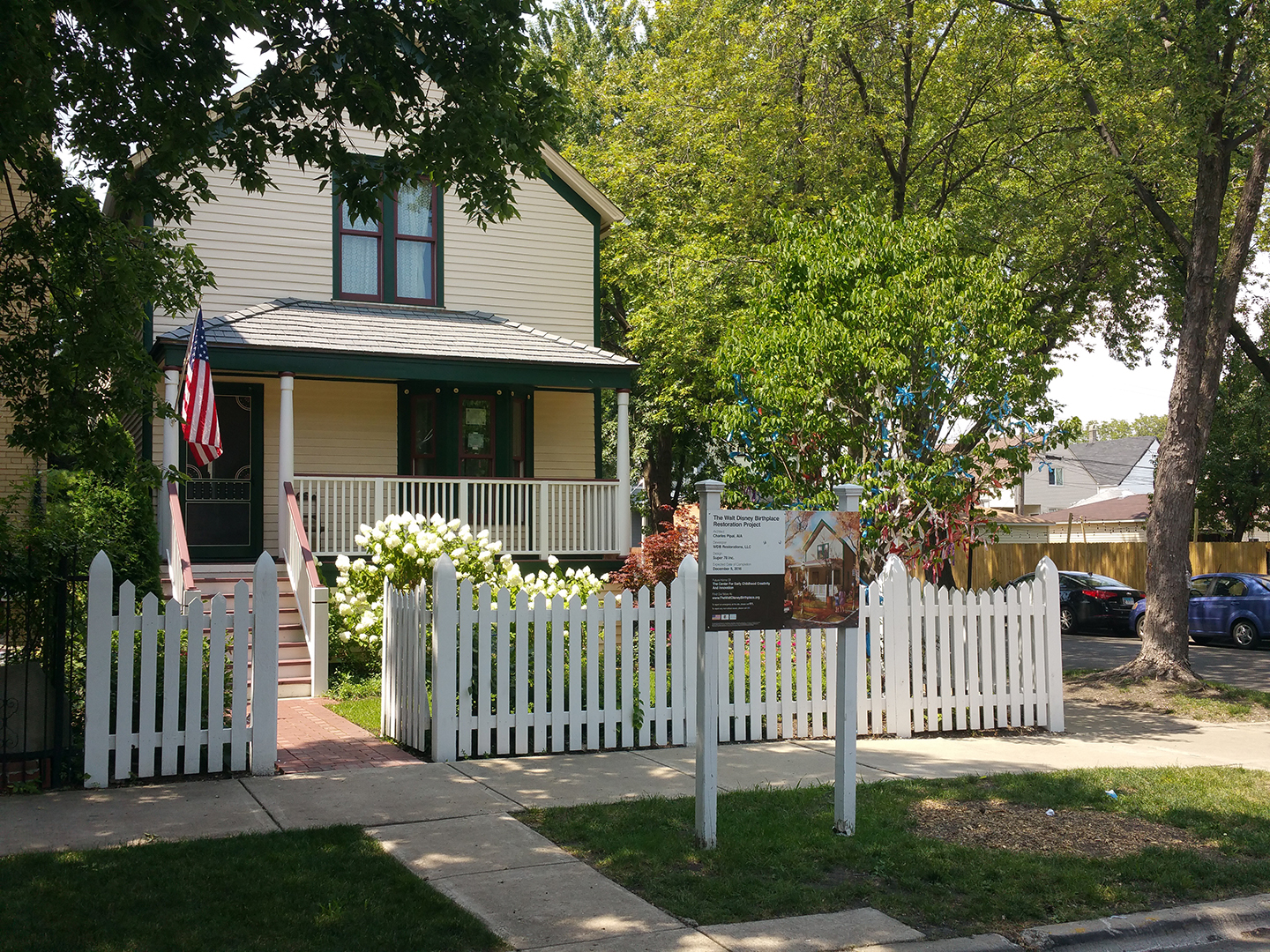
Birthplace of Walt Disney, at 2156 North Tripp Avenue

- Chester A. Chesney (1916–1986), member of the United States House of Representatives from Illinois's 11th congressional district for the 81st United States Congress. He resided at 2828 North Kolmar Avenue while a member of Congress.
- Michael Gross, actor (Family Ties, Tremors). He was raised in the neighborhood.
- Mary Gross, actress and Saturday Night Live cast member. She was raised in the neighborhood.
- Leonard W. Schuetz (1887–1944), member of the United States House of Representatives from 1931 until his death in 1944. He resided at 4445 West Wrightwood Avenue during his political career.

=== Walt Disney ===
Hermosa is the birthplace of Walt Disney, born on December 5, 1901. The house Walt was born in was designed and built by his father and mother, Elias Disney and Flora Call Disney, in 1893. The home is located at the corner of Tripp Avenue and Palmer Street at 2156 North Tripp Avenue, formerly 1249 Tripp Avenue before the address system was overhauled in 1909. The home was sold in 2013. The new owners intended to restore the home and hope to obtain landmark status for the structure. The City of Chicago attempted to designate the structure as a Historic Landmark in 1991, but the owner of the property at the time fought the designation. Brent Young, Dina Benadon, and Todd Regan, the executive director, are currently raising funds to repair the siding, install restoration windows and paint the structure.

== Religion ==
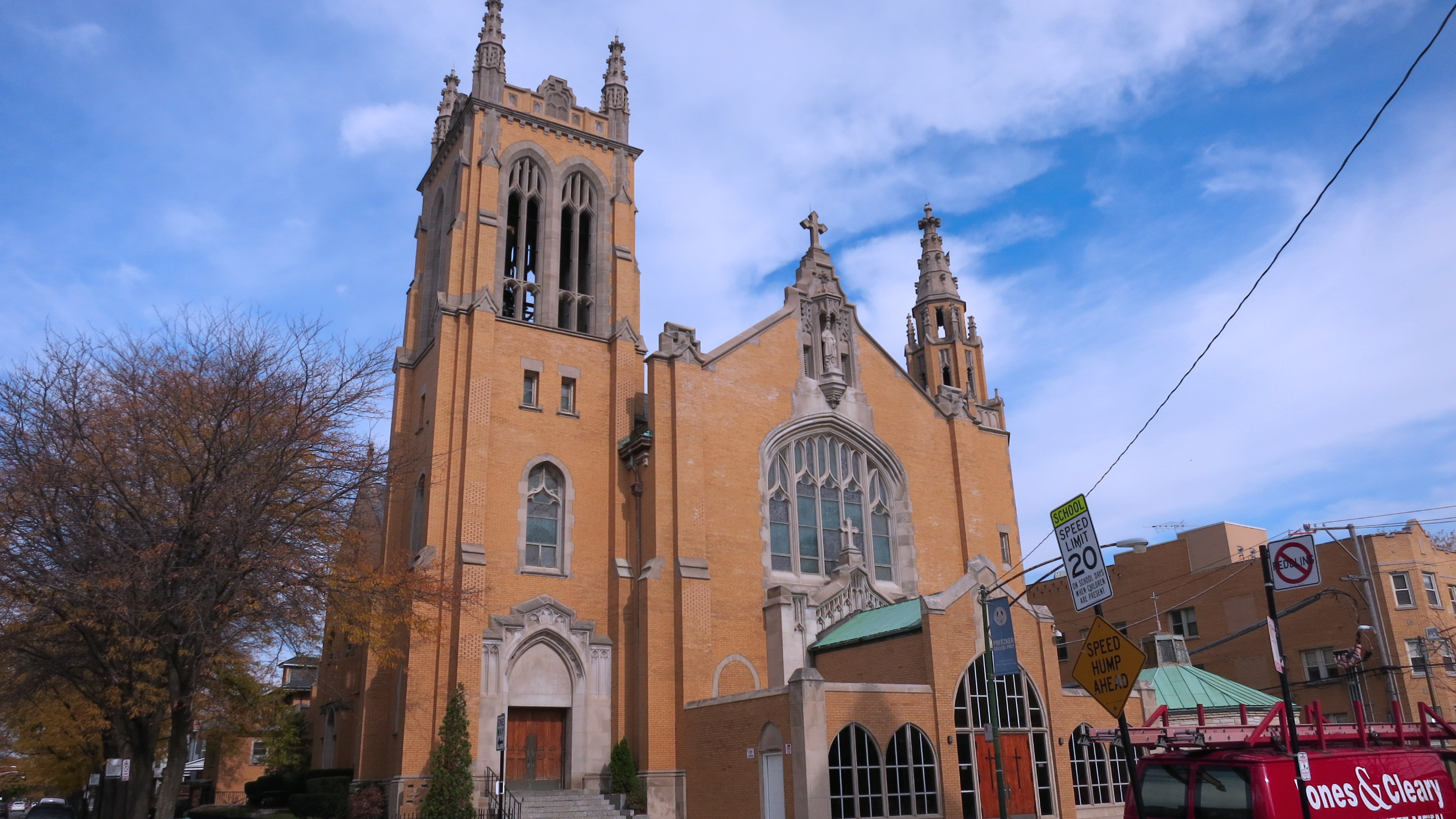
St. Philomena Catholic Church.

One of the most notable structures in Hermosa is the St. Philomena Catholic Church, which is located on 1921 N. Kedvale Ave. The church was founded in 1894. Pritzker College Prep is located within the St. Philomena campus.

St. Paul Congregational United Church of Christ, established in 1900, and located on 2257 N. Keeler has the notable distinction of being the location of Walt Disney's childhood baptism. Today, St. Paul is known as Iglesia Evangelica Bautista Betania.

== Industry ==
Industry is a notable component of the built environment in Hermosa. Some 14.8% of all the general land use in Hermosa is for industrial use and 61.7% of all the available employment within the community, totaling 2,215 jobs comes from industry. As a result, manufacturing is the top sector of employment within Hermosa. However, health care is the number one industry sector of employment for Hermosa residents in any neighborhood at 13.9% of total employment.

== Politics ==
The Hermosa community area has supported the Democratic Party in the past by overwhelming margins. In the 2016 presidential election, Hermosa cast 5,219 votes for Hillary Clinton and cast 587 votes for Donald Trump (86.59% to 9.74%). In the 2012 presidential election, Hermosa cast 4,271 votes for Barack Obama and cast 489 votes for Mitt Romney (88.41% to 10.12%).

== Education ==
=== Chicago Public Schools ===
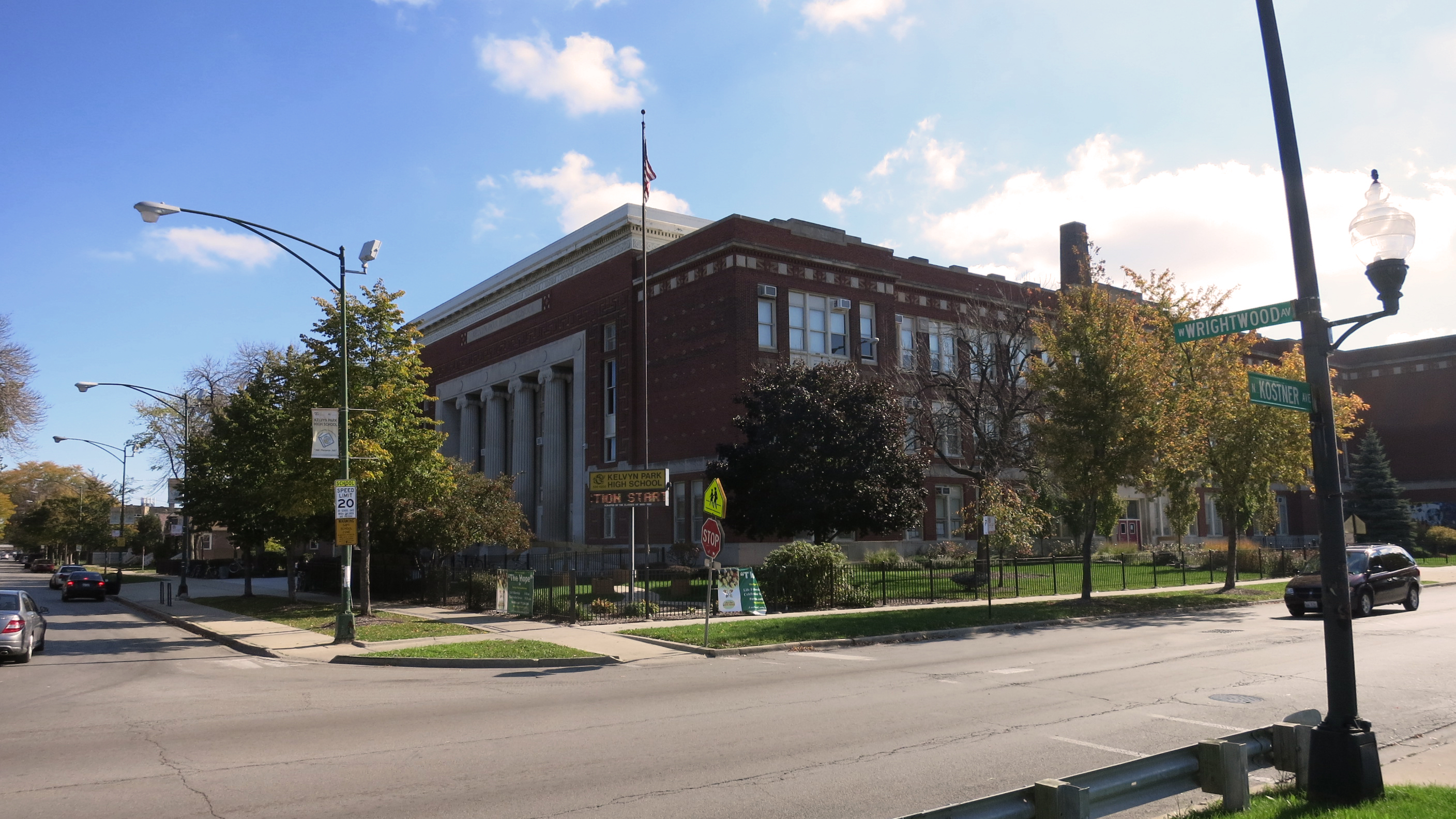
Kelvyn Park High School.

- Kelvyn Park High School is a CPS 4-year high school, with 933 students attending. Kelvyn Park High is currently being converted into a 7-12 grade school to compensate for the loss of Ames Middle School which was converted into the Marine Math and Science Academy. The conversion of Ames is considered controversial among community stakeholders and is currently being contested.
- North-Grand High School is a CPS 4-year high school, with 926 students attending.
- William Penn Nixon Elementary School is a CPS PK-6 grade school, with 1,061 students attending.
- Barry Elementary School is a CPS PK-6 grade school, with 838 students attending.
- McAuliffe Elementary School is a CPS PK-8 grade school with 678 students attending.

=== Charter schools ===
- Pritzker College Prep is a public four-year charter high school, with 858 students attending. Before turning into a charter in 2006, Pritzker was known as the St. Philomena School. Philomena School was closed in 2005, along with 23 other Catholic elementary schools in mostly African American and Latino communities.

=== Private schools ===
There are several private PK-K schools located throughout Hermosa as well as a PK-4 grade private religious school, called the Chicago Christian Academy.

== Parks ==
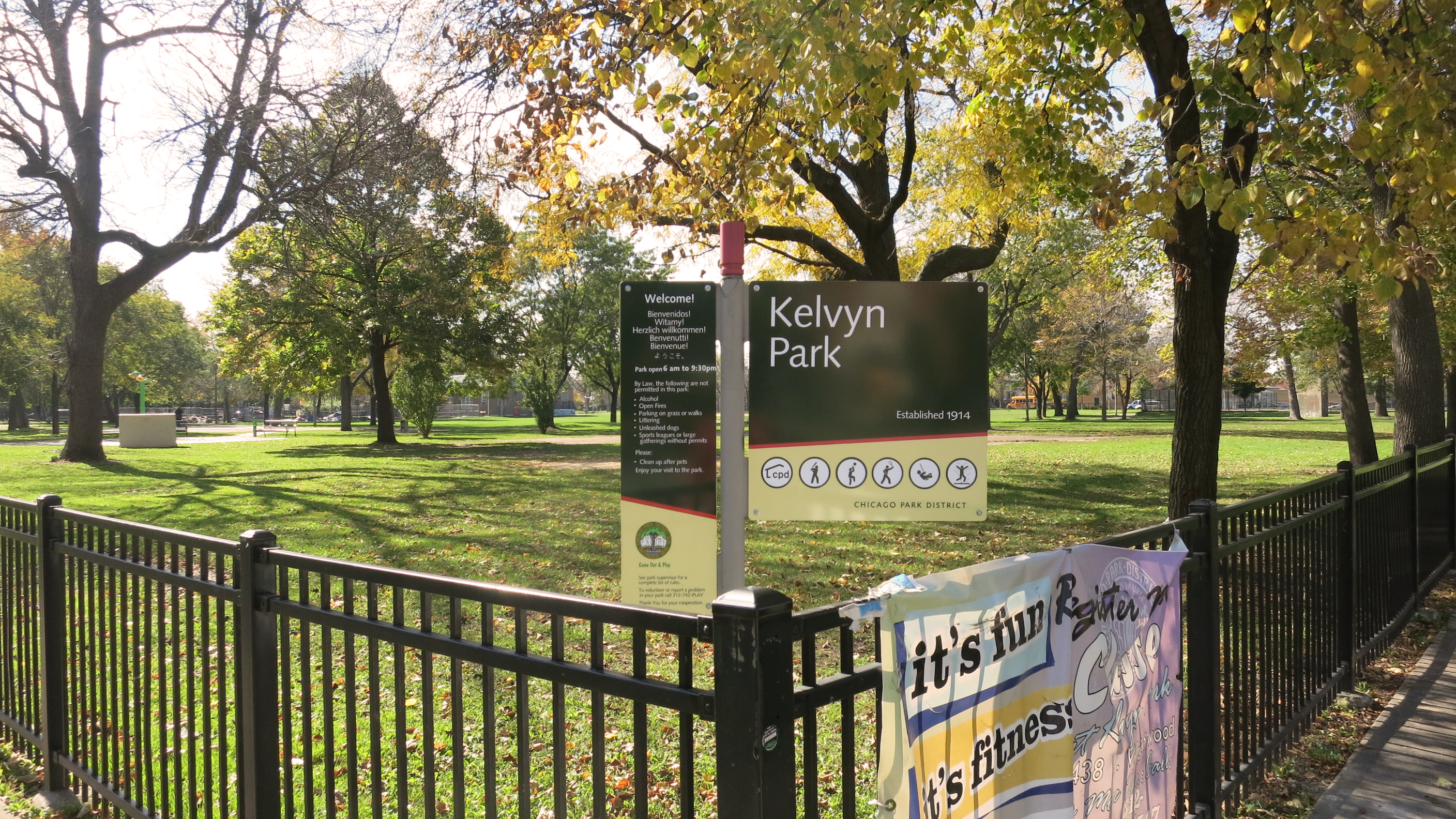
Kelvyn Park.

Kelvyn Park is part of the Chicago Park District. It is located at 4438 W. Wrightwood Avenue. At eight and one-half acres, Kelvyn Park is the largest park in the Hermosa community area. The park offers two walking paths, two softball fields, a combination football/soccer field, a basketball court, a volleyball court, two tennis courts, horseshoe courts, plus a playground and spray pool. A large field house located on premises offers a fitness center, gymnasium, auditorium, several meeting rooms, and a small kitchen.

Hermosa Park is a part of the Chicago Park District. It is located 2240 N. Kilbourn Ave. Hermosa Park is a little over four acres. The Park features two walking paths, one senior and two junior baseball fields, one softball field, a combination football/soccer field, a basketball court, a volleyball court and a playground with spray pool.

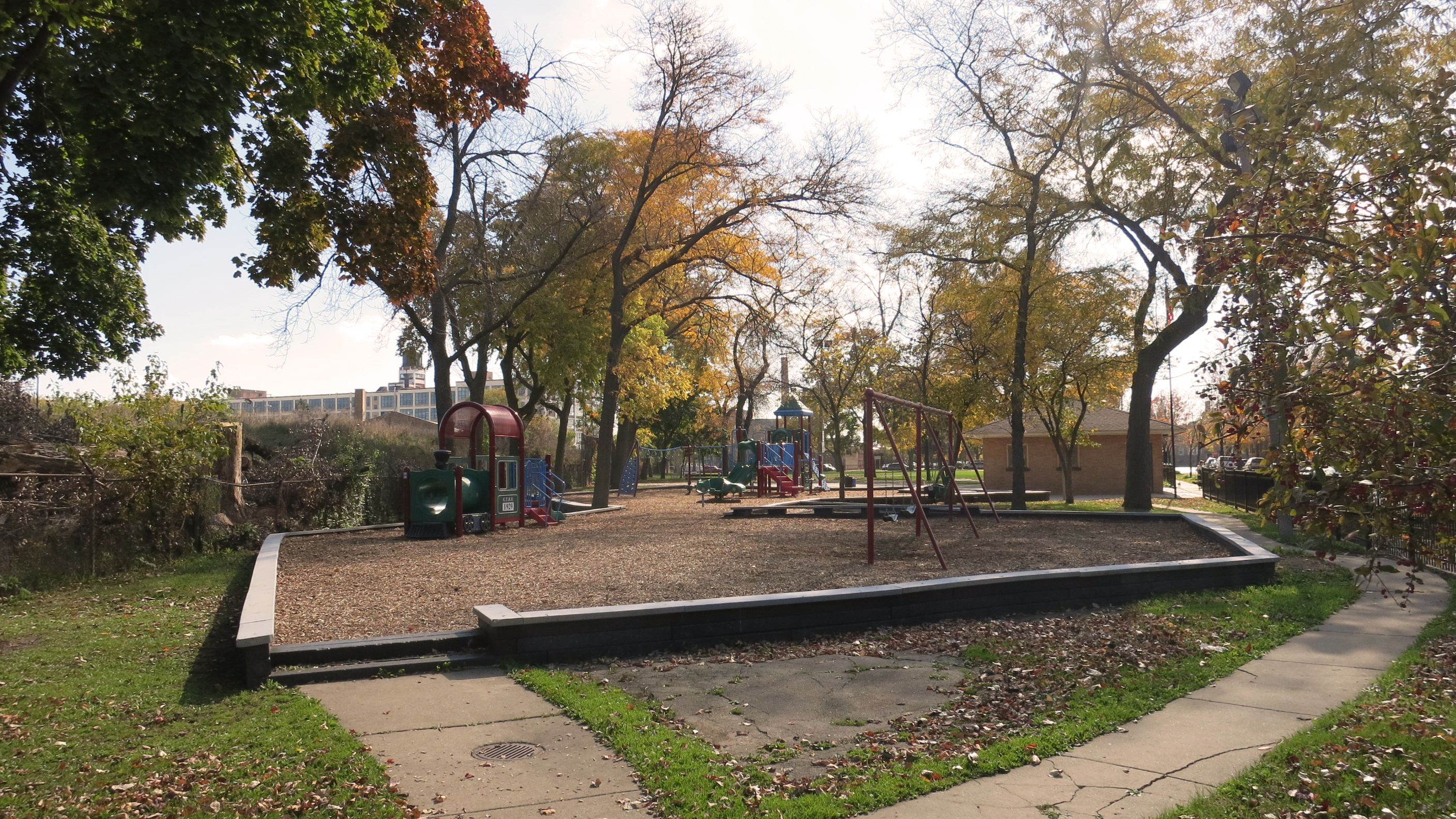
Ken-Well Park.

Ken-Well Park is a part of the Chicago Park District. It is located at 2945 N. Kenosha Ave. Ken-Well Park is a small three acre park. The park features a junior baseball field, a softball field, a combination football/soccer field, a basketball court, and a playground with a spray pool. The park's name combines those of the two adjacent streets, Kenosha Avenue and Wellington Street. It borders the Milwaukee District North Line.

Keystone Playlot Park is part of the Chicago Park District. It is located at 1653 N. Keystone Ave. The park, along with the street, are named after Pennsylvania, long known as the "Keystone State."

The southeasternmost edge of Hermosa is less than a quarter mile walking distance of the westernmost edge of the Bloomingdale Trail.

== Transportation ==
Hermosa receives a high walkability score and is served by several CTA bus routes, the Blue Line and the Milwaukee District / North Line.

=== Metra ===
- Grand/Cicero (Milwaukee District West Line)
- Healy (Milwaukee District North Line)

=== CTA ===
- 53 Pulaski
- 54 Cicero
- 56 Milwaukee
- 65 Grand
- 72 North
- 73 Armitage
- 74 Fullerton
- 76 Diversey
- 77 Belmont
- Logan Square (Blue Line)
