= Hermosa Bungalow Historic District =

Historic district in Illinois, United States

- U.S. National Register of Historic Places
- U.S. Historic district
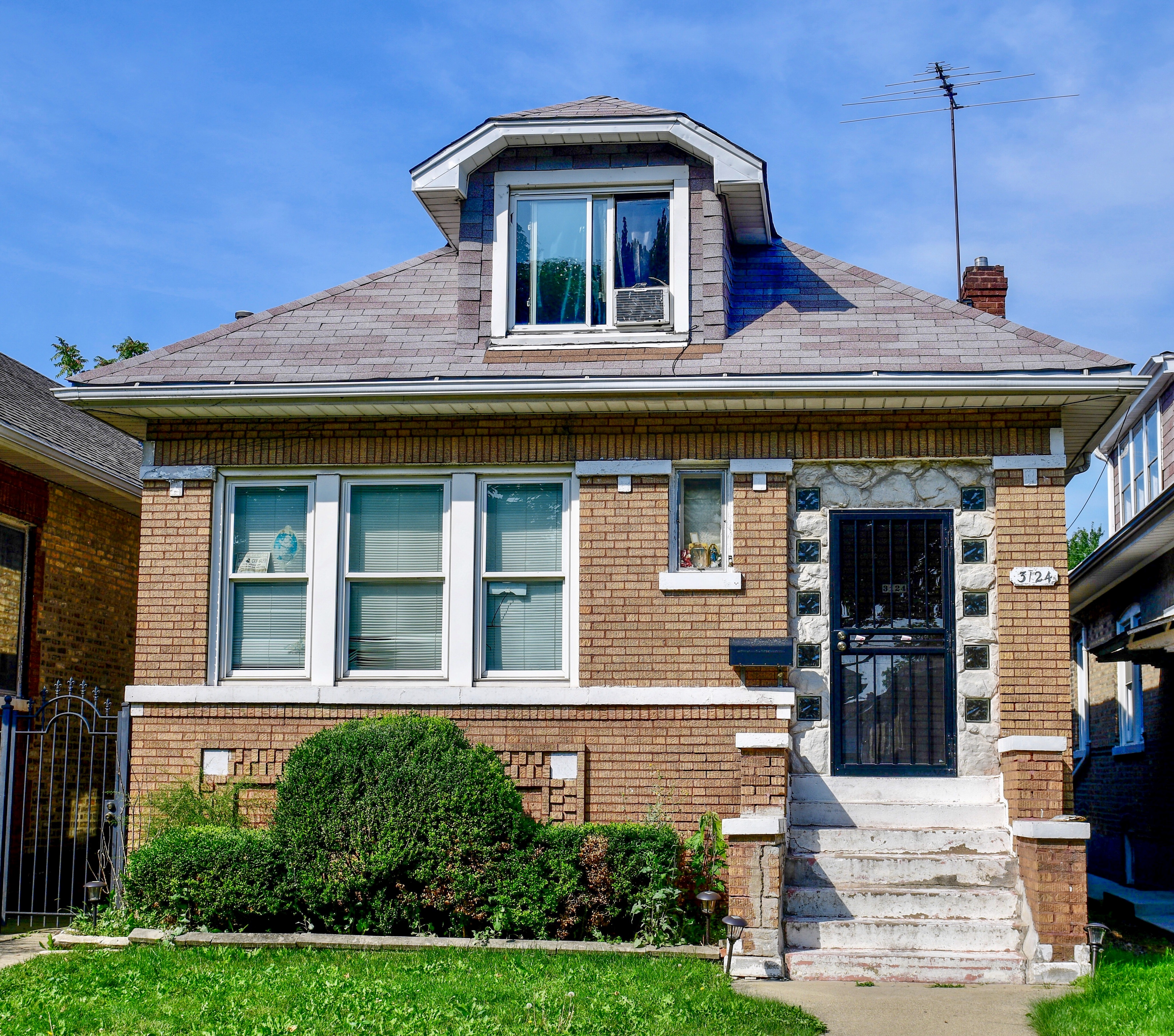
- Michael Faheny House

- Location within Chicago metropolitan area Location within Illinois Location within the United States
- Location: Roughly bounded by W. Belmont, N. Lowell, W. Diversey & N. Kolmar Aves.Chicago, Illinois
- Coordinates: 41°56′07″N 87°44′17″W
- Architectural style: Bungalow
- NRHP reference No.: 100003263
- Added to NRHP: December 31, 2018

The Hermosa Bungalow Historic District is a historic district on the National Register of Historic Places in the Hermosa community area on the northwest side of Chicago. The district is roughly bounded by W. Belmont Avenue to the north, N. Lowell Avenue to the east, W. Diversey Avenue to the south, and N. Kolmar Avenue to the west. The district's contributing properties include 298 bungalows, 15 brick multi-unit apartment buildings, 8 brick two-flats, 3 garages, and Barry Elementary School.

On December 31, 2018, the Hermosa Bungalow Historic District Chicago was added to the National Register of Historic Places. It was the 13th such Chicago district to be added to the Register.
