= Collins Engineers =

Hydroengineering company

- Industry: Engineering
- Founded: 1979
- Founder: Thomas J. Collins
- Headquarters: Chicago, Illinois
- Key people: Elizabeth Collins (President)
- Website: collinsengr.com

Collins Engineers, Inc. is an ENR Top 500 Design Firm and provides water resources, waterfront, program management and underwater engineering services to government agencies, contractors, and private sector clients. The firm was founded by Thomas J. Collins in April 1979. It is a privately held company with eighteen offices in the United States, United Kingdom, and Ireland. Collins Engineers, Inc. is headquartered in Chicago, Illinois.

Collins Engineers, Inc. was an early advocate for the use of professional engineers as diving inspectors in the evaluation of underwater structures. The firm provides underwater engineering services performed by in-house engineer-divers around the world to clients including the United States Navy and state departments of transportation. Reference manuals were developed on the subject for the Federal Highway Administration (FHWA) and National Highway Institute (NHI).

In 2006, Collins Engineers, Inc. acquired MacIntosh Engineering and Development Co. located in Auburn, California. In 2008, Collins Engineers, Inc. acquired Charles Keim & Associates, Inc. located in Boulder, Colorado.

== Projects ==
=== Bridge Engineering ===
- Design Services for The Bloomingdale Trail/The 606, Chicago, Illinois
- Climbing and Rope Access Inspections of Structures for Network Rail, London, England
- SC 802 over the Beaufort River (Intracoastal Waterway), Beaufort, South Carolina
- Park Island Bridge Design and Management, Mt. Pleasant, South Carolina
- Reconstruction of Metra Bridge No. Z-70.5 over Lake Street, Hanover Park, Illinois
- Milwaukee River Parkway Bridges (North and South), Milwaukee, Wisconsin
- SC 49 Bridge over the Enoree River, Laurens County, South Carolina
- Virginia Avenue Bridge, Charleston, South Carolina
- Emergency Underwater Inspection Following Impact at Eggner Ferry Bridge, Trigg and Marshall Counties, Kentucky
- Bridge Management Database & 3-D Scanning for Waterways Ireland
- Emergency Response to Early Spring Flooding—Grand Forks, North Dakota, and East Grand Forks, Minnesota
- Rope Access and Climbing Inspections, Statewide, Montana
- Post-Flood Scour Inspections, Statewide, Rhode Island
- Post-Hurricane Irene Scour Inspections, New Jersey and Massachusetts

=== Construction ===
- Wells Street Bascule Bridge Reconstruction, Chicago, Illinois
- Rehabilitation of Juneau and Wisconsin Avenue Lift Bridges, Milwaukee, Wisconsin
- EJ&E Bridge Roll-In Design, Morris, Illinois
- Wacker Drive Rehabilitation Construction Engineering, Chicago, Illinois
- Millennium Park Construction Engineering, Chicago, Illinois
- I-94 Dan Ryan Expressway Reconstruction Construction Engineering, Chicago, Illinois
- Interstate 94 (I-94) North-South Freeway Project Construction Inspection, Southeast Wisconsin
- Marquette Interchange Construction Inspection, Milwaukee, Wisconsin
- Mitchell Interchange Construction Inspection, Milwaukee, Wisconsin
- I-94 Construction Inspection, Stearns Road to Wisconsin State Line, Gurnee, Illinois

=== Dams ===
- Reconstruction of Sinnissippi Dam, Rock Falls, Illinois
- Mohawk River Dam Safety Inspection, Rotterdam Junction, New York

=== Manual and Course Development ===
- Underwater Bridge Inspection (FHWA-NHI-10-027), Federal Highway Administration/National Highway Institute
- Underwater Bridge Repair, Rehabilitation, and Countermeasures (FHWA-NHI-10-029), reference manual and course, Federal Highway Administration/National Highway Institute
- Pontis Development & Implementation for Louisiana Department of Transportation and Development
- Bridge Inspection and Reporting Guidelines, U.S. Navy Bridge Inspection Program
- Guidelines for the Installation, Inspection, Maintenance and Repair of Structural Supports for Highway Signs, Luminaires, and Traffic Signals (FHWA NHI 05-036), Federal Highway Administration/National Highway Institute
- Underwater Investigations Standard Practice Manual, American Society of Civil Engineers
- Underwater Evaluation and Repair of Bridge Components (FHWA-DP-98-1), Federal Highway Administration
- Underwater Bridge Inspection (FHWA-DP-80-1), Federal Highway Administration
- Chicago Department of Transportation Rules and Regulations for Construction in the Public Way, 2014 and 2016

=== Program Management Oversight/Infrastructure Management ===
- Chicago Department of Transportation Project Coordination Office (2012 - current), Chicago, Illinois
- Chicago Department of Transportation, dotMaps (2012 - current), Chicago, Illinois

=== Seismic Engineering ===
- Charleston County School District Seismic Assessment, Charleston, South Carolina
- Union Pier Cruise Terminal, Charleston, South Carolina
- Parkside Avenue/Ocean Avenue Bridge Assessment, New York, New York
- Fort Vancouver National Historic Site Building Evaluation, Vancouver, Washington

=== Structural Engineering ===
- CITGO Lemont Refinery Coker Turnaround, Lemont, Illinois
- Pulaski Road's Single Point Urban Diamond Interchange over Interstate 55, Chicago, Illinois

=== Waterfront Facilities ===
- Union Pier Terminal Design, Charleston, South Carolina
- U.S. Coast Guard Facility Indian River Underwater Acoustic Imaging and Shoreline Stabilization, Rehoboth, Delaware
- Chicago Riverwalk, Chicago, Illinois
- Rehabilitation of the Fuel Pier at the Ronald Reagan Ballistic Missile Defense Test Site Kwajalein Atoll, Republic of the Marshall Islands
- Vietnam Veterans' Memorial at Wabash Plaza, Chicago, Illinois
- Repairs to Waterfront Facilities at the U.S. Naval Academy
- Structural Inspection of the Frying Pan Shoals and Diamond Shoals Light Towers for the U.S. Coast Guard, Cape Fear and Cape Hatteras, North Carolina
