= Riverline (development) =

- Status: Under construction
- Groundbreaking: 2016

Companies
- Developer: CMK Companies

Riverline is a multi-building redevelopment under construction in South Loop, Chicago. CMK Companies is the developer, and Gensler is serving as the design architect. In 2025, the first phase of Riverline at 1010 South Wells Street began light foundation work, and the Chicago Department of Planning and Development approved the revised site plan for 910 South Wells Street.

== History ==
The site was originally part of a larger project, also dubbed "Riverline" which was the effort of a partnership between Chicago-based developer CMK and Australian company Lendlease. The partnership was dissolved in early 2018, and the project was split into Riverline and Southbank.

Groundbreaking occurred in 2016 before the dissolution of the partnership. The development is north of The 78, an unrealized mega-development.

== See also ==
- Foundry Park
- Southbank, Chicago
