= Pritzker College Prep =

Coordinates: 41°54′53.3″N 87°43′46.6″W

Location
- 4131 W. Cortland Street; Chicago, Illinois 60639; United States

Information
- School type: Public Secondary Charter
- Motto: It all starts at Pritzker
- Opened: 2006
- Principal: Caroline Ryden
- Grades: 9–12
- Gender: Coed
- Enrollment: 986 (2017-18)
- Campus type: Urban
- Colors: orange blue
- Website: Pritzker College Prep

Pritzker College Prep is a public four-year charter high school located in the Hermosa neighborhood in Chicago, Illinois. It is a part of the Noble Network of Charter Schools. It opened its doors in 2006 and serves over 986 students in grades nine through twelve, as of the 2017–2018 school year.

== Background ==
=== History ===
Pritzker College Prep was founded in 2006 as one of the first expansion campuses of the Noble Network of Charter Schools. It is named in honor of donors Penny Pritzker and Bryan Traubert.

=== Location ===
Pritzker is located in the Hermosa neighborhood of Chicago in a building leased from the Archdiocese of Chicago. Before Pritzker opened, the building served as St. Philomena Elementary School.

=== Partnerships ===
Since 2008, Pritzker has partnered with Phillips Exeter Academy for teacher training and collaboration around the Harkness method of instruction.

Each summer since 2012, rising seniors from the school attend the Pushkin Summer Institute at the University of Wisconsin-Madison for intensive Russian language studies. Since 2015, Pushkin participants have also been eligible to travel to Eastern Europe after graduation through a partner grant between PSI and the National Security Language Initiative for Youth.

Through Noble's partnership with the Right Angle Foundation and the Summer of a Lifetime program, top sophomores are invited to attend college summer programs around the country with most of their expenses covered.

== Course Offerings ==
=== IB and AP Courses ===
In June 2015 Pritzker became certified as an International Baccalaureate school. As of the 2018–2019 school year, the school also offers AP courses.

=== Band Program ===
Pritzker's Jazz band performs annually at the Berklee College of Music, and has performed at Lake Forest College and the Chicago Jazz Festival, among other venues. In 2010, the program received new instruments thanks to a grant from Fidelity. Band teacher Ben Das was also named a TNTP Fishman Prize finalist in 2015.

==== Journalism Program ====
The Journalism program, which produces The Pritzker Press online and in print, was established in 2014. Writers from the program compete annually through both the Scholastic Press Association of Chicago High School Media Awards and Conference and the Illinois Journalism Education Association's Newspaper & Digital News Media Competition. The Pritzker Press placed 3rd and 2nd overall in 2017 and 2018, respectively, in its division in the IJEA competition.

== Extracurriculars ==
=== Athletics ===
As of the 2018–2019 school year, the school has competitive teams for 15 sports: Football, boys’ soccer (varsity and JV), girls’ soccer (varsity and JC), boys’ rugby, girls’ rugby, girls’ volleyball, cross country (co-ed), boys’ basketball (varsity and JV), girls’ basketball (varsity and JV), cheerleading (co-ed), wrestling (co-ed), baseball, softball, track and field, and ultimate frisbee (co-ed).

==== Noble League (formerly Noble Athletic Conference) championships ====
Sources:

- Football: 2009, 2010, 2012, 2014, 2015
- Cheer: 2014, 2015, 2016, 2017, 2018
- Girls’ Soccer: 2015, 2016, 2017, 2018
- Boys’ Soccer: 2010, 2011, 2012, 2014
- Baseball: 2009, 2015

==== IHSA Regional championships ====
Sources:

- Girls’ Soccer: 2014, 2015, 2017
- Softball: 2014

==== State championships ====
Sources:

- Boys’ Rugby: 2013 (IYRA TIER 3)
- Ultimate Frisbee: 2015 (IYU B-DIVISION)

=== Clubs ===
As of the 2018–2019 school year, the school offers over 20 competitive and non-competitive clubs.
