= A. Finkl & Sons Steel =

Steel Company in Chicago, Illinois

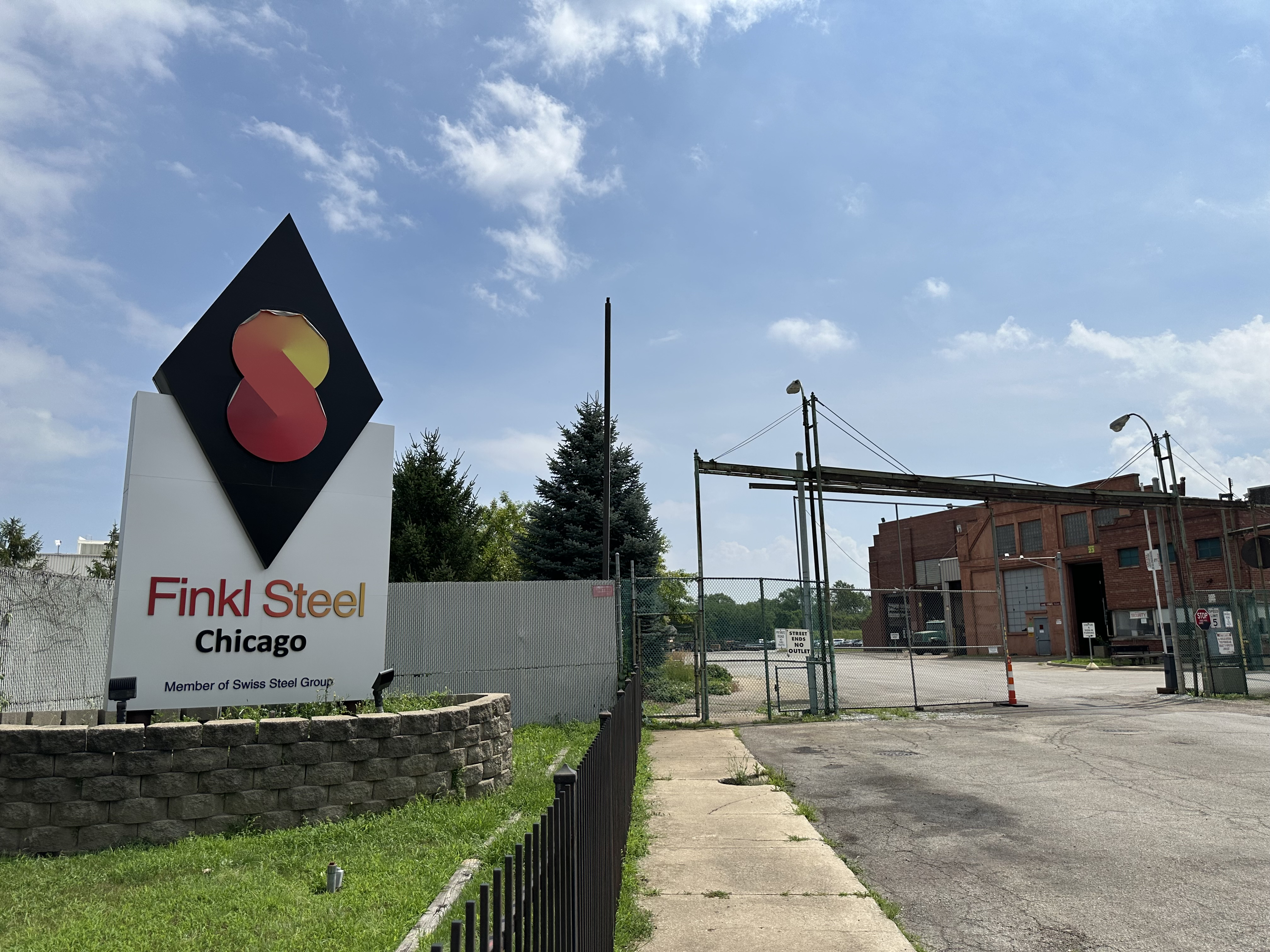
- Entrance to Finkl Steel in Burnside, Chicago, 2025
- Built: c. 1879 – c. 1880
- Operated: c. 1880–present
- Location: Chicago, Illinois
- Coordinates: 41.7248°N 87.5898°W
- Industry: Steel

A. Finkl & Sons Steel or Finkl Steel is a steel mill that operates in the South Side of Chicago (previously the Near North Side) and has been in business since 1879 or 1880.

== History ==
Video of Finkl Steel metal being forged in 2003

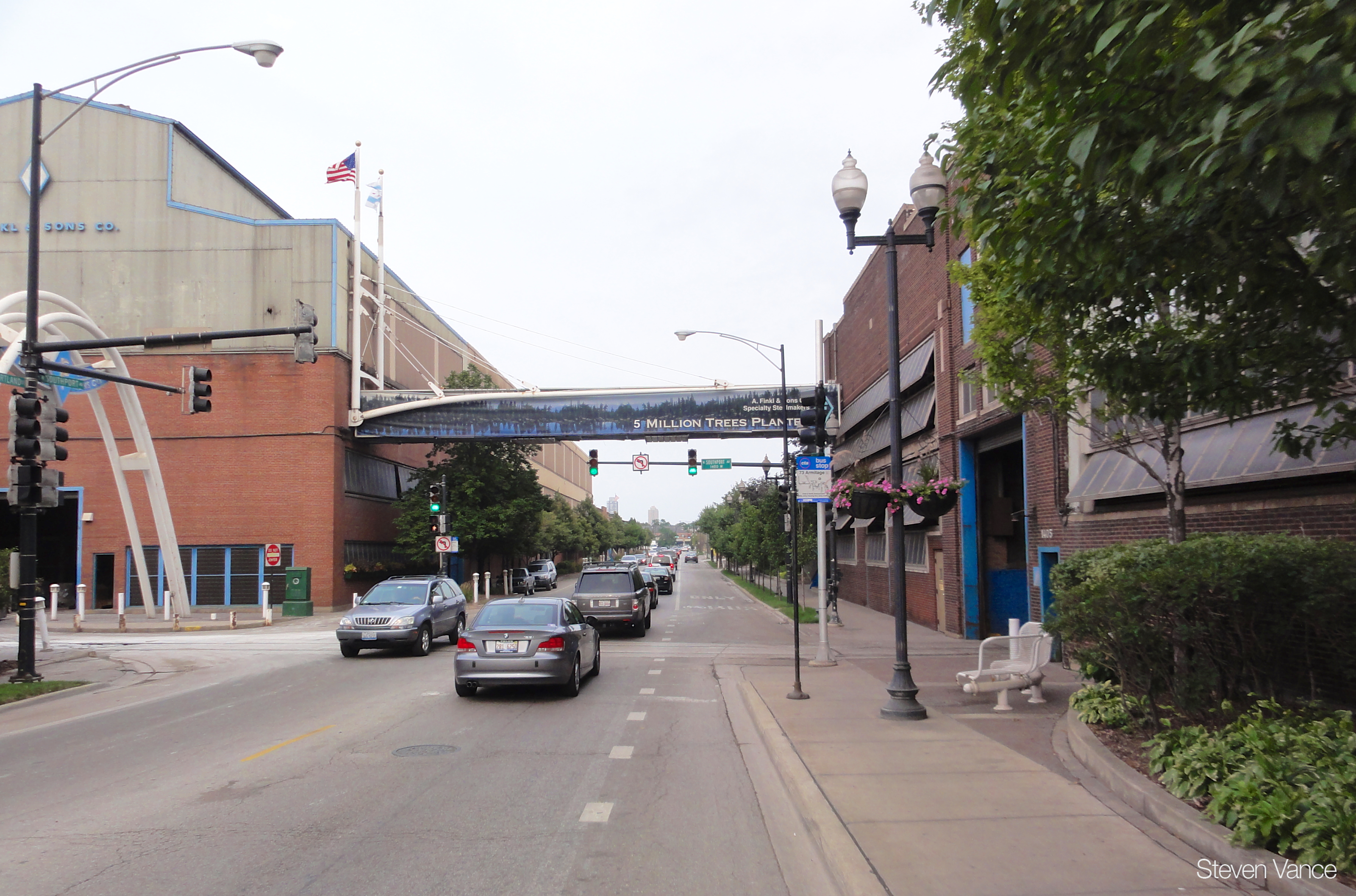
Lincoln Park location in 2011 (now demolished)

The main mill operated along a roughly 22-acre lot along the eastern portion of the Chicago River in the Lincoln Park neighborhood for over 112 years before being demolished. The Lincoln Park location was Chicago's oldest steel mill.

In 2006, it bought the site of the former Verson Steel on Chicago's South Side. It was purchased by the Swiss Steel Group in 2008, and has since operated from that location.

In 2016, real estate developer Sterling Bay purchased the Lincoln Park site for a sum believed to be over $100 million and renamed the site to Lincoln Yards.
