= Verson Allsteel Press Co. =

American machine tool manufacturer

Verson Allsteel Press Co. was a manufacturer of machine tools in Chicago, Illinois. It built sheet-metal presses of all sizes, including some weighing thousands of tons and as tall as a three-story building. Major customers for such presses are automobile and appliance manufacturers. In the 1980s, Allied Products Corp., a large conglomerate, purchased Verson, along with other manufacturing firms. In January 2001, Allied Products sold the majority of its Verson assets to Enprotech Corp. for $21.5 million less certain adjustments. Enprotech Corp., which is owned by the Japanese firm, Itochu International, continues to produce large presses under the brand name Verson-LCM.

== Company beginnings and growth ==
In 1910, Morris Verson, a Jewish Russian blacksmith, arrived in Galveston, Texas, with his three sons, David, John and Ralph. The three of them had no friends, could speak no English, and had a total capital of 50 cents. The next year they moved to Chicago, and the boys found work in a machine shop there. David learned to read English by emptying wastebaskets and reading the papers he found in them. By 1917, the two of them had saved enough money to buy a machine shop of their own. A few months later, the U.S. entered World War I, and both boys volunteered for service. David had a bad eye and was sent to work in a gun factory in Erie, PA, while John was sent to France. After the war, they purchased another machine shop in Chicago. At this shop, they began making presses. The first presses were small enough that they were delivered by streetcar.

John Verson was considered the mechanical genius of the firm, and David, the company president, was the more outgoing financier-salesman. In 1931, sales were $66,583. The company had its first million-dollar year in 1940. By 1960, it was 30 times that. Their younger half-brother Harold was considered the mechanical genius. He graduated high school in Chicago and attended Crane Tech for another year or two.

In 1947, the company built the largest all-steel drawing press ever manufactured up until that time. It was 62 ft. long, 14 ft. wide, and 36 ft. high. It weighed over a million pounds and took over a year to build. Built for an appliance manufacturer, it could stamp out drawers for stoves at the rate of eight per minute, or 480 an hour. This operation previously required the use of five separate machines.

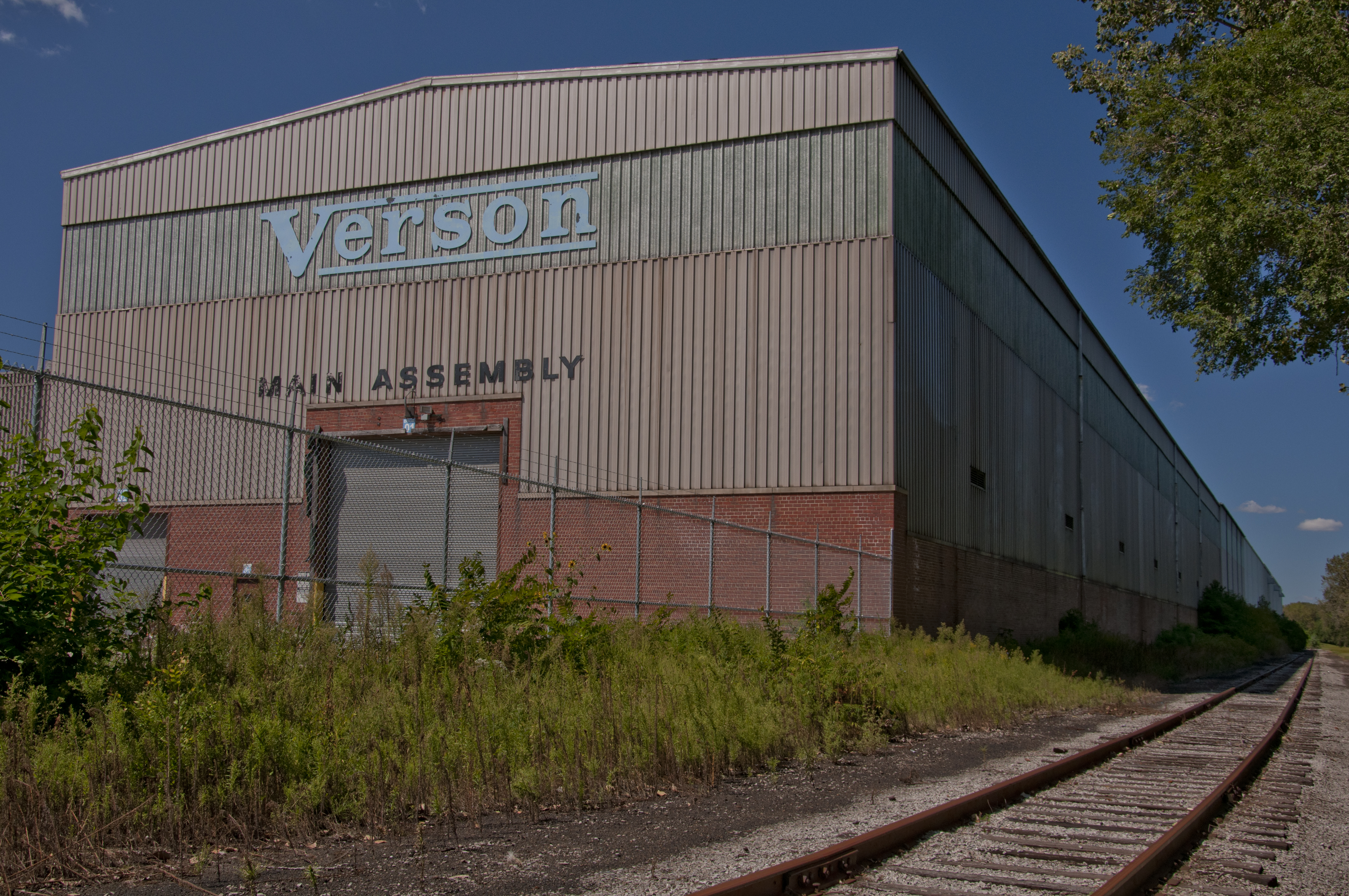
Final Assembly building. Verson's large plant in Chicago, IL includes numerous other buildings, such as the die shop, "Big Tools" building, and fabrication building.

== Later difficulties ==
In the early 1980s, the firm faced difficulties due to an economic downturn, with factory operating rates of 60-70%. In addition, foreign competition, primarily from Japan, made significant inroads into the machine-tool market.

In May 1986, the conglomerate Allied Products Corp. purchased Verson. Verson then had annual sales of $100 million but was losing money.

By 1991, Allied Products was suffering and selling off subsidiary companies in order to pay off bank loans. However, it held onto Verson, because a 16% duty had been imposed on Japanese presses as a result of claims that it was dumping machines onto the US market. In 1996, Verson built what was referred to by the Chicago Tribune as the "mother of all machine tools," a 2,500-ton press as big as a house. It was capable of stamping out parts for 3,000 automobiles per day. Destined for Chrysler Corp., it had to be disassembled into 50 different pieces in order to be shipped.

The company was taken over in 2001 by Enprotech Corp, (which is owned by Itochu International, a Japanese company). Verson presses are still produced for manufacturing a variety of products such as automotive body panels, appliances, sinks, bathtubs, and other items made from sheet metal.

In 2006, the plant was bought by A. Finkl & Sons Steel. and TST.
