= Bloomingdale Trail =

Elevated rail trail in Chicago

Bloomingdale Trail Park
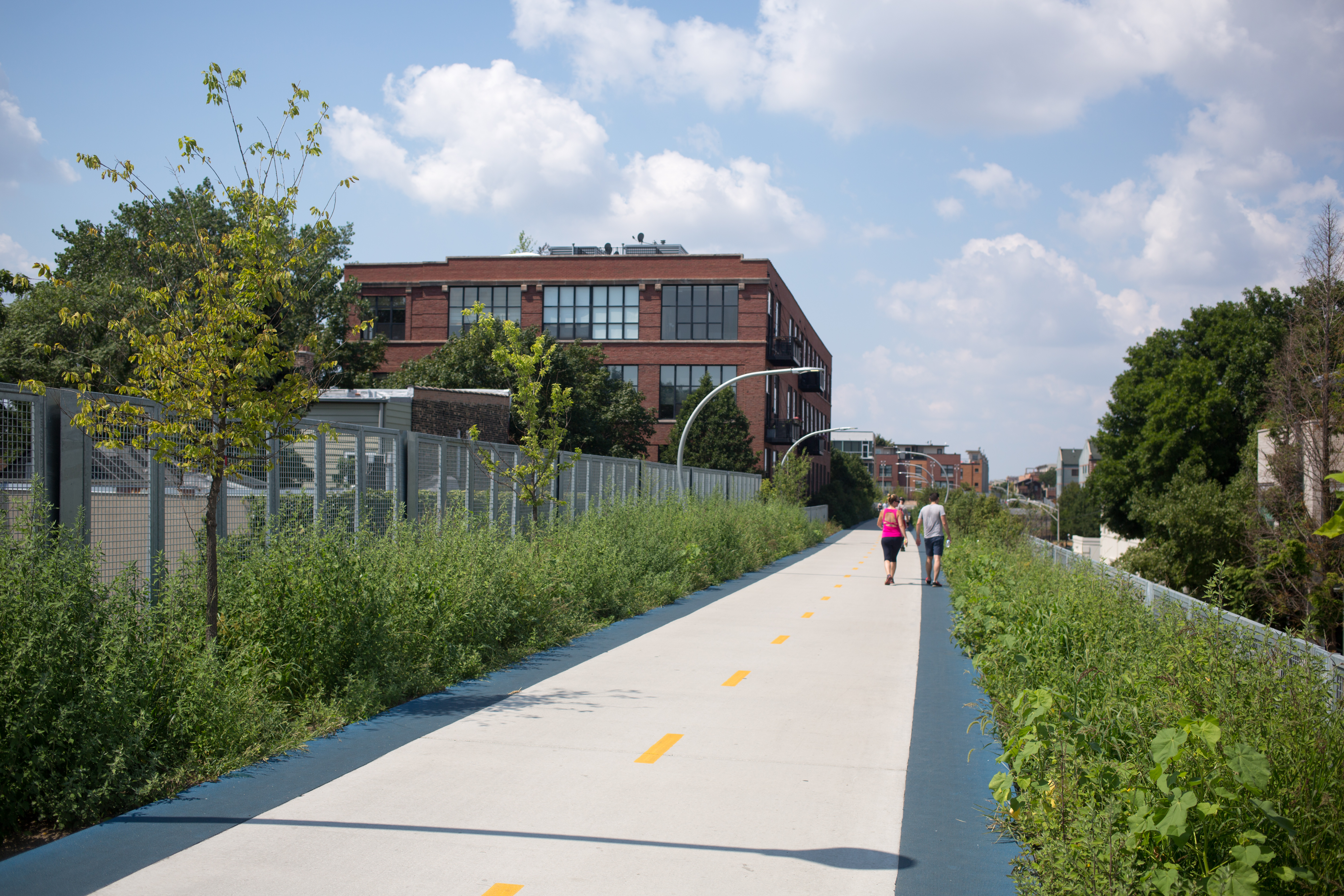
- Interactive map of Bloomingdale Trail Park
- Location: 1600-3750 W. Bloomingdale Ave. Chicago, Illinois, United States
- Coordinates: 41.9138°N 87.7020°W
- Area: 15.60 acres (6.31 ha)
- Established: 2013
- Operator: Chicago Park District
- Open: 6:00 am–11:00 pm
- Status: Open all year
- Paths: Bloomingdale Trail
- Public transit: CTA Routes 9, 49, 50, 56, 82, 94, 2511, Blue Line (Western)
- Website: Official Website

Bloomingdale Trail Park, previously Park No. 572, is a 15.6-acre (6.3 ha) 2.7-mile (4.3 km) long elevated linear park running east–west along Bloomingdale Avenue between Ashland Avenue and Lawndale Avenue on the northwest side of Chicago. Part of The 606 network and operated by the Chicago Park District, it is the longest greenway project of a former elevated rail line in the Western Hemisphere, and the second longest in the world after Promenade plantée René-Dumont in Paris. In 2015, the City of Chicago converted the former Bloomingdale railway line to an elevated greenway and rail trail. The Park is in the Logan Square, Humboldt Park, and West Town community areas.

== History ==
=== Bloomingdale rail line ===
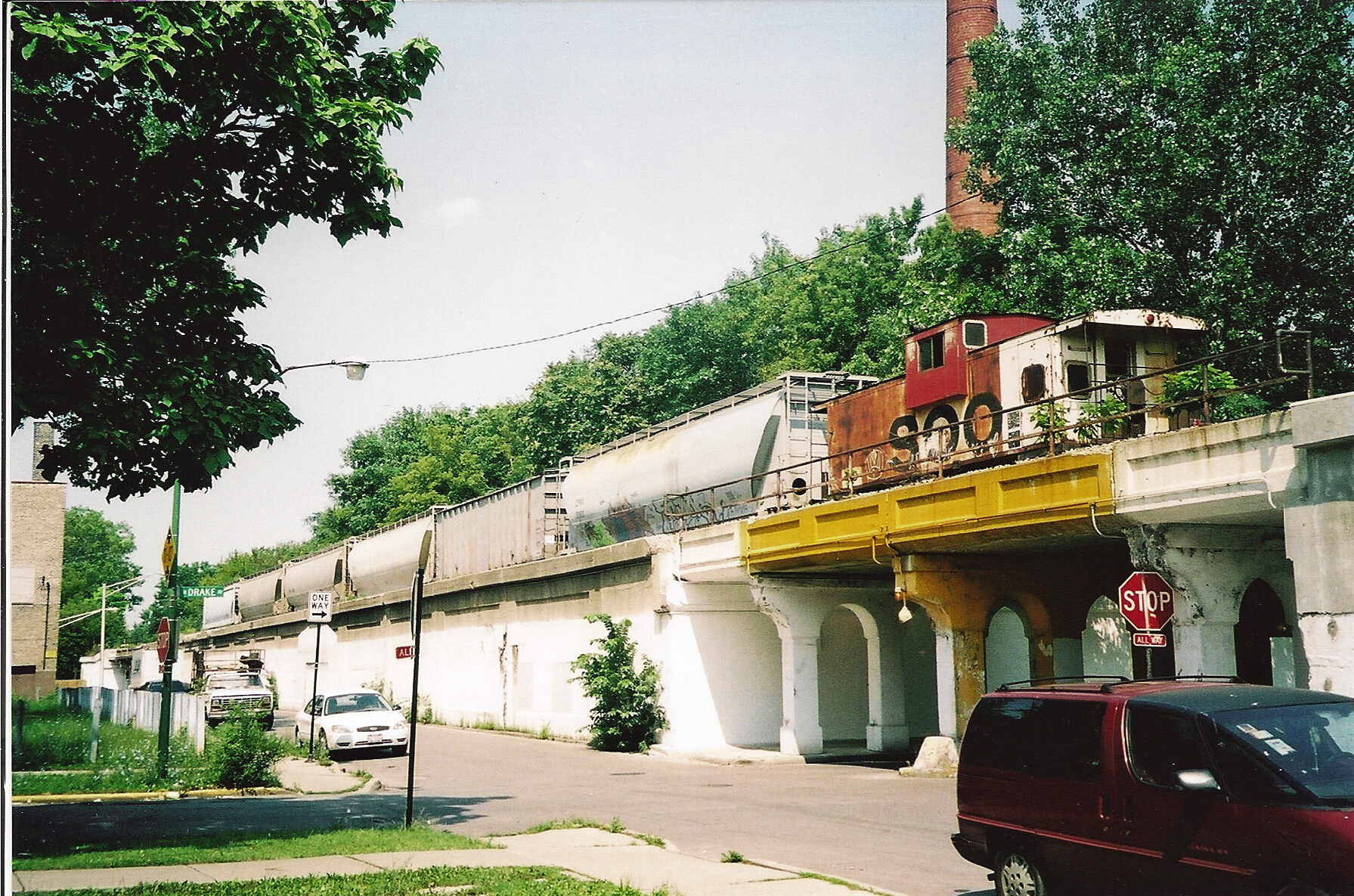
Train on the Bloomingdale Line at Drake and Bloomingdale, 2006

The Bloomingdale Line was constructed in 1873 by the Chicago & Pacific Railroad Company as part of the 36-mile (58 km) Elgin subdivision from Halsted Street in Chicago to the suburb of Elgin, Illinois. It was soon absorbed by the Chicago, Milwaukee, St. Paul and Pacific Railway (also known as the Milwaukee Road), first via a 999-year lease in 1880 and later with a fee simple deed conveyance to the same in 1900. It became part of the Soo Line Railroad (a subsidiary of the Canadian Pacific Railway), in 1986 when the Soo Line acquired the railroad operations and assets of the Milwaukee Road out of bankruptcy from parent Chicago Milwaukee Corporation (CMC). The City of Chicago purchased the property right-of-way from Canadian Pacific in January 2013.

The rail line was elevated approximately twenty feet in the 1910s as result of a city ordinance aimed at reducing pedestrian fatalities at grade crossings. The line had been a street-running railway within Bloomingdale Avenue, an east–west street running at 1800 north; creating the embankment reduced Bloomingdale Avenue's width in some cases, rendering it an alleyway in some portions. Steel-reinforced concrete embankment walls line the corridor, with 38 viaducts built.

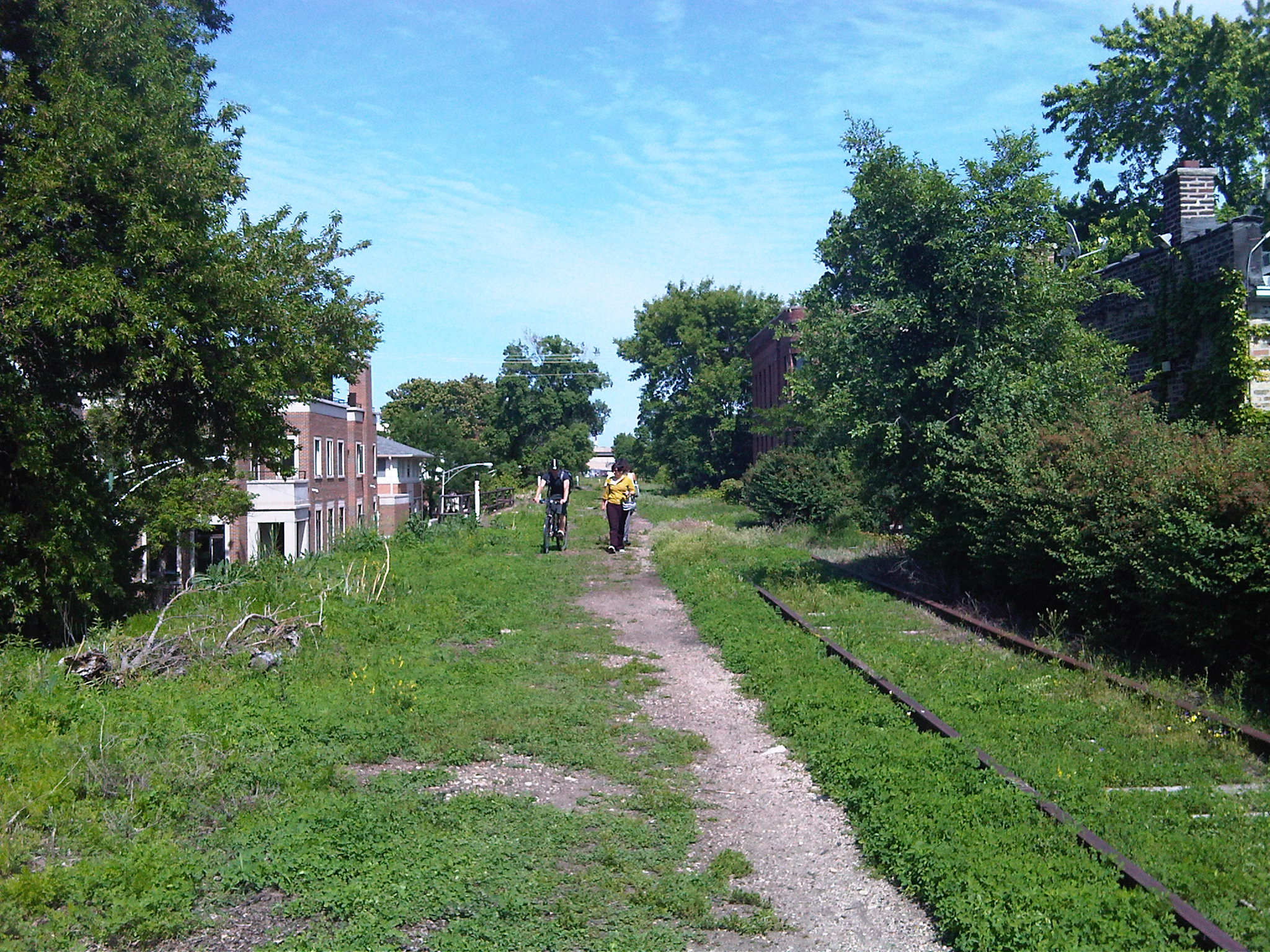
Bloomingdale line in 2009, years before removal of railroad tracks

The railway was used for both passenger and freight trains and served several local industrial businesses, including a Schwinn Bicycle Company warehouse. The Bloomingdale Line was primarily used to reach the former Milwaukee Road tracks on the Chicago & Evanston Line (popularly known as the Lakewood Branch and the Kingsbury Branch), the remnant of the Deering Line, and on Goose Island. The Bloomingdale Line connected to the former Milwaukee Road tracks east of the North Branch of the Chicago River at C&E Junction located in the middle of Kingsbury Street and just south of Cortland. The last through freight train operated over the line in 2001. Canadian Pacific then used the Bloomingdale Line to store freight cars as well as when switching nearby Newly Weds Foods up through 2012.

The Bloomingdale Avenue embankment continues west of the trail terminus at Ridgeway Avenue, where it intersects with Metra's commuter tracks of the Milwaukee Road, with northbound North Line trains continuing toward Fox Lake using the CP C&M Subdivision and West Line trains running along the Bloomingdale tracks west to Elgin via the CP Elgin Subdivision. The tracks lower to surface-level on the western outskirts of the city.

=== Greenway construction ===
August 2013 groundbreaking ceremony, with Rahm Emanuel speaking

The City of Chicago first investigated converting the Bloomingdale Line into a greenway in 1997, but the railway was still in active use. The city and community reintroduced the greenway concept as part of the Logan Square Open Space Plan in 2002–2004." This plan proposed a linear park or greenway with several public access ramps. At the east end, a trailhead would be created at the Chicago River.

A grassroots, non-profit organization, Friends of the Bloomingdale Trail (FBT), was formed in 2003 to be the focal point for advocacy and community involvement in the conversion project. FBT partnered with the City and The Trust for Public Land, a national non-profit land conservation group, in a collaboration that lead the project management, design, and development.

Collins Engineers, Inc. was selected to provide Phase II design. A groundbreaking ceremony occurred on August 27, 2013, at what would become the Milwaukee Avenue / Leavitt Street connection to the trail.

In November 2013, the Alphawood Foundation offered a $2 million grant to finance the project. The park officially opened on June 6, 2015. There have been various proposals to connect the trail to the former A. Finkl & Sons Steel property, a 22-acre site in Lincoln Park.

=== Post-construction ===
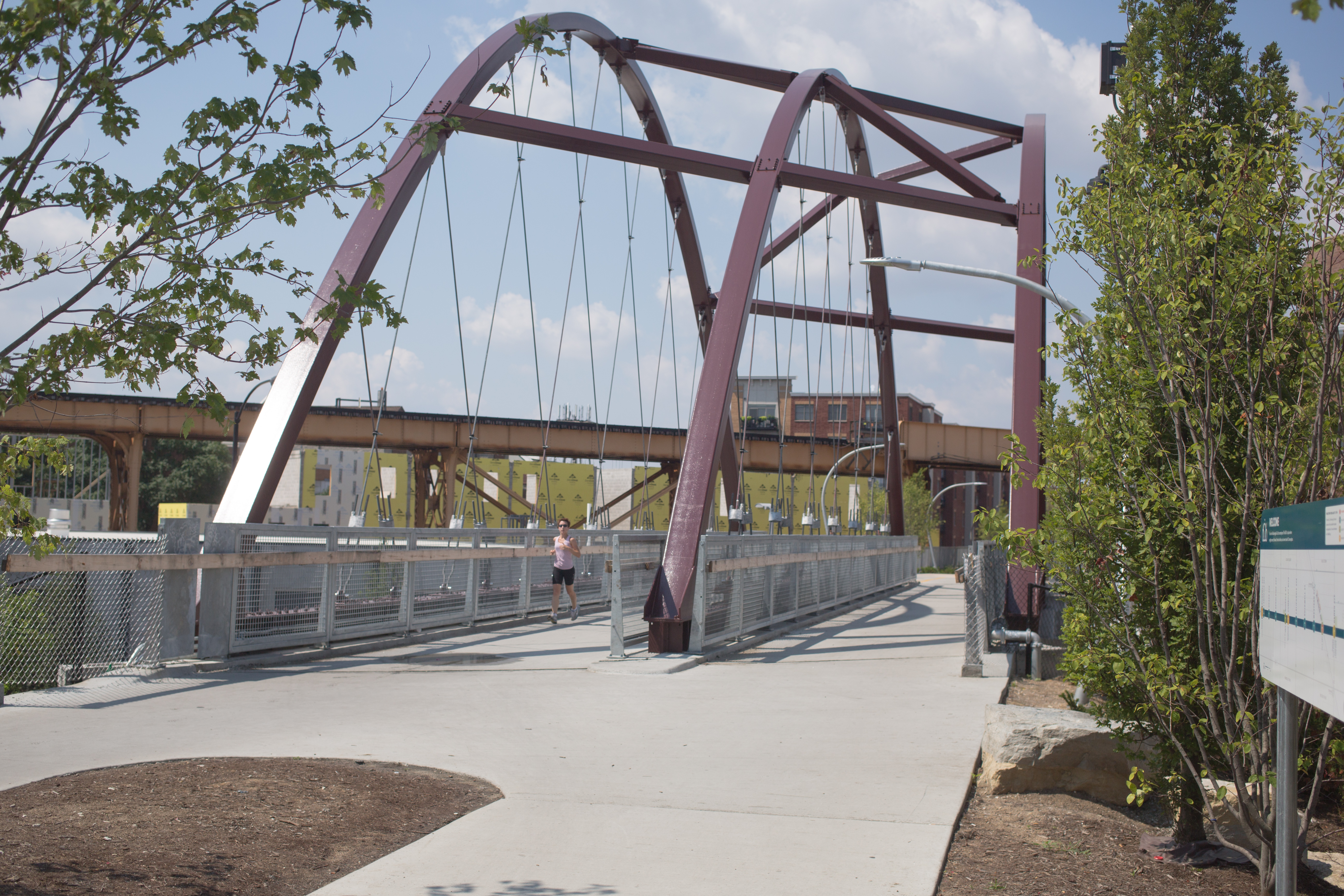
Milwaukee Bridge

Since the opening of the park in 2015, the areas around it have experienced gentrification with housing prices increasing 344% from 2012 to 2019 near the western half of the trail. In response, local alderman passed city ordinances prohibiting replacement of multifamily apartment buildings with single-family detached homes without specific zoning approval and imposing fees on developers who do so. Construction of Encuentro Square, an affordable housing development near the west end of the trail, was approved by the city in May 2022. Local advocacy groups incorporated a community land trust which received funding from the state of Illinois.

== Attractions ==
Some attractions within the park include; The Bloomingdale Trail (multi-use path), several nature trails, picnic and seating areas, apiaries, Damen Arts Plaza, Humboldt Overlook, Milwaukee Bridge, St. Louis Overlook, and the Exelon Observatory at Ridgeway. Bloomingdale Trail Park also connects directly to other neighborhood parks and playgrounds.

== Connections to other parks ==
Bloomingdale Trail Park is the backbone of The 606 connecting the multiple parks and trail network together.

=== The 606 ===
The 606 consists of several linked parks along the Bloomingdale Trail including; Bloomingdale Trail Park, Walsh Park, Park No. 512 (Ashland Trailhead), Churchill Field Park, Julia de Burgos Park, and Park No. 567 (Ridgeway Trailhead). The numeric name is an homage to the city's ZIP Codes, the prefix for nearly all of which is 606.

Bloomingdale Trail
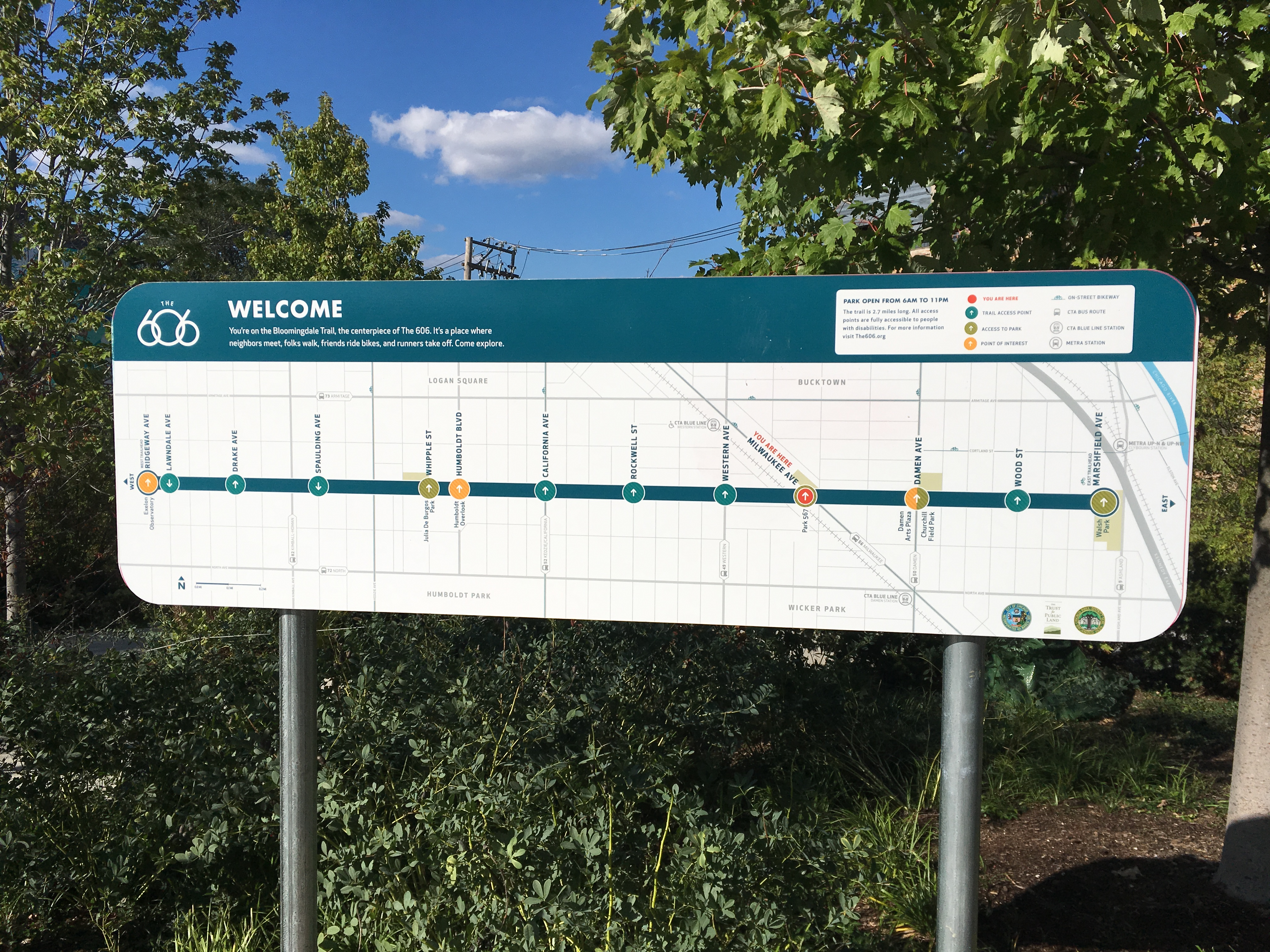
- Map found along trail
- Length: 2.7 mi (4.3 km)
- Location: Chicago, Illinois, United States
- Began construction: 2013
- Completed: 2015; 11 years ago
- Trailheads: East end: Park No. 512;Walsh Park, West end: Ridgeway Avenue;Park No. 579
- Use: Biking, Running, Walking

Trail map
- Bloomingdale Trail highlighted in red with marked access points

== Bloomingdale Trail ==
Bicycling west to east on the Bloomingdale Trail

The Bloomingdale Trail, part of the 606 Trail network, is a 2.7-mile (4.3 km) multi-use rail trail operated by the Chicago Park District that follows the former Bloomingdale rail line running east–west throughout the park between Ashland Avenue and Ridgeway Avenue. The surface of the trail is concrete with a blue rubberized running path flanking each side and is used by walkers, runners, and cyclists during park operating hours. The trail runs from east–west, Park No. 512 (Ashland Trailhead)/Walsh Park though Bloomingdale Trail Park to Park No. 579 (Ridgeway Trailhead) with several access points throughout.

=== Extension ===
In August 2023, Chicago Department of Transportation unveiled a plan to extend the Bloomingdale Trail east of Ashland Avenue. The plan is to take the trail over Ashland Avenue, underneath the Kennedy Expressway, and under the Metra rail lines corridor to connect with Elston Avenue, and eventually across the Chicago River, connecting to the Lincoln Park neighborhood through Foundry Park. The extension is planned to be completed by late 2027.

== See also ==
- List of rail trails
