= Foundry Park =

Residential neighborhood in Chicago

Coordinates: 41°55′06″N 87°39′48″W

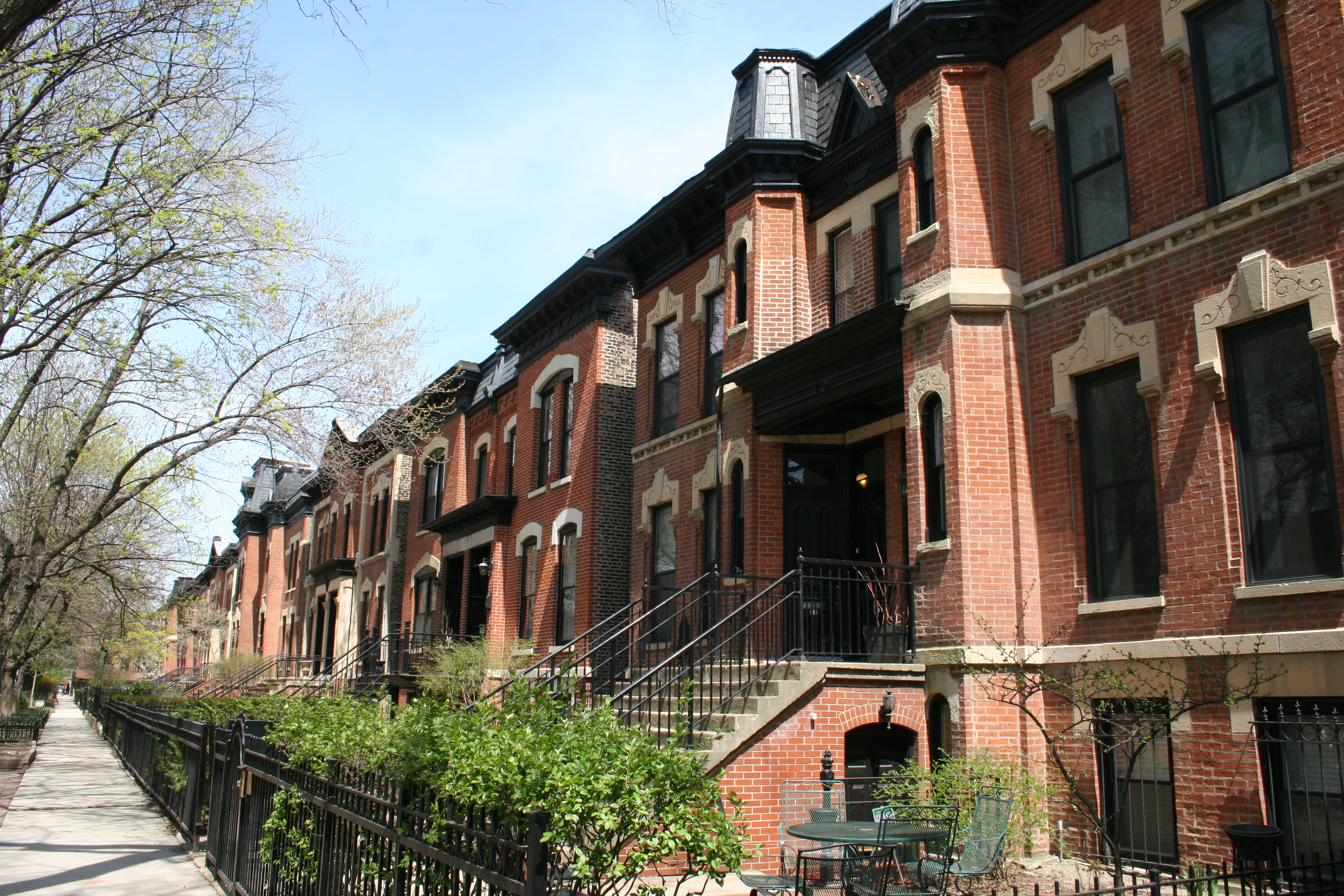
Lincoln Park is an established residential community

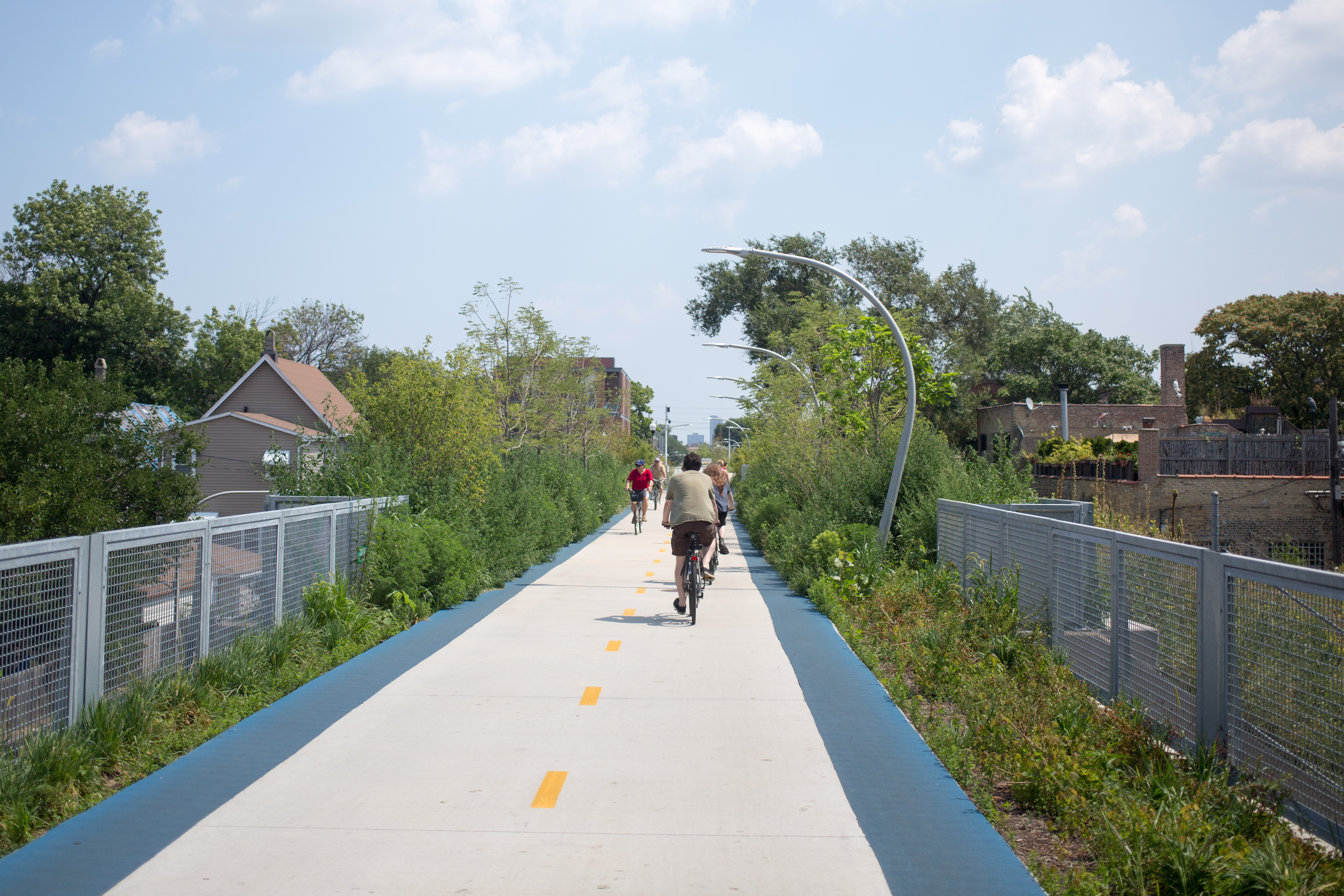
Bloomingdale Trail will be extended through Foundry Park

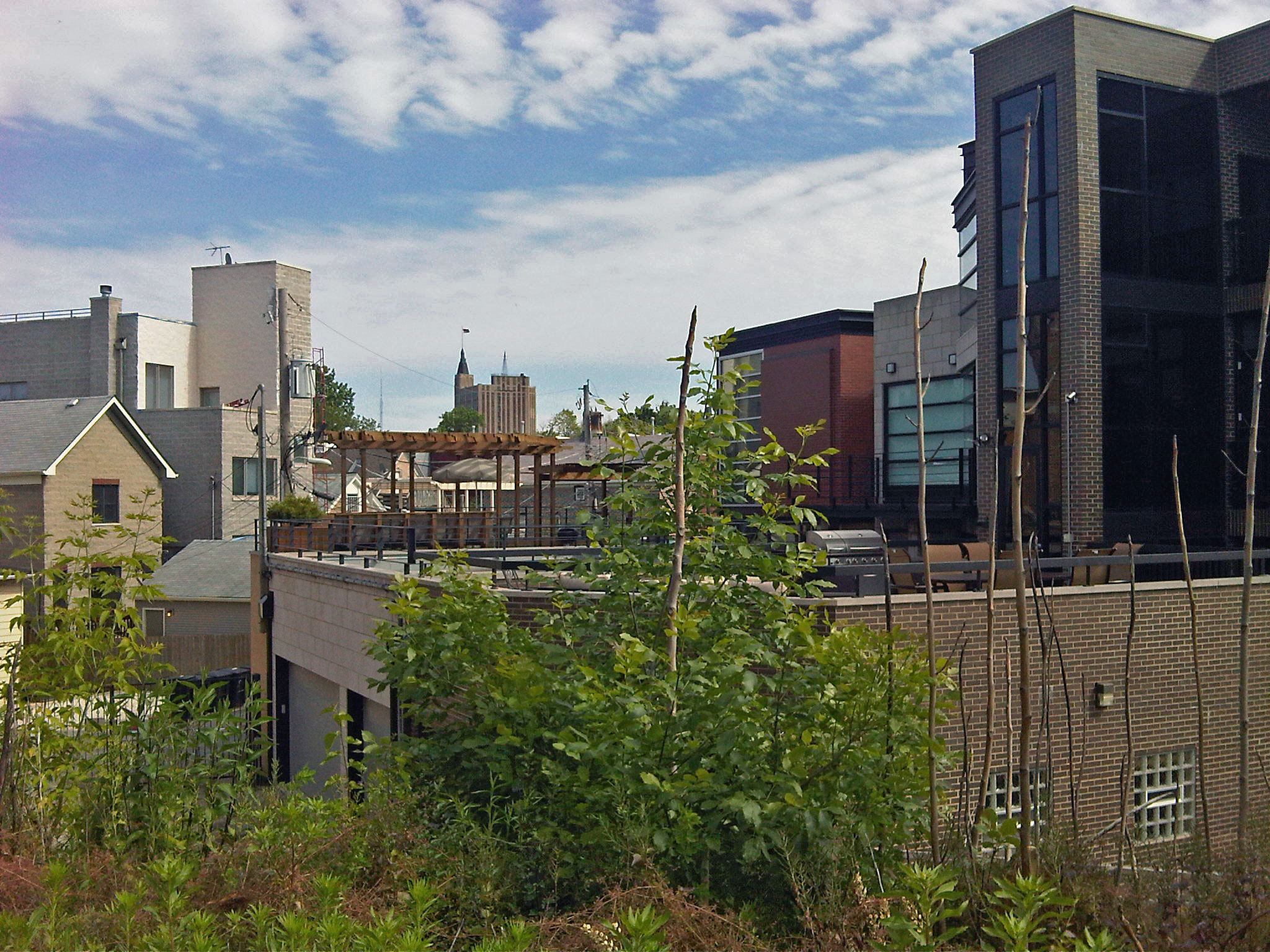
Bucktown will connect to Lincoln Park through Foundry Park

Foundry Park is a mixed-use development under construction in Chicago between Bucktown and Lincoln Park. The residential neighborhood is expected to cost over $1 billion and take several years to complete, creating approximately 2,800 residential units. The plan includes an extension of the Bloomingdale Trail over the Chicago River into Lincoln Park. Foundry Park will rely on tax increment financing to build public infrastructure.

In July 2025, JDL Development and Kayne Anderson Real Estate announced the acquisition of the 31-acre (13 ha) site, including the old Finkl Steel property on Cortland Street along the Chicago River. The area would have been the northern section of Lincoln Yards if it had been built. The developers are using the address 2001 N. Southport Avenue for the overall project. Foundry Park is planned to be a walkable neighborhood with tree-lined, low-traffic streets and new open green space that abuts the Chicago River and offers four-season recreation, i.e. farmers markets, art fairs and ice skating. It is expected that about 20% of the residential units at Foundry Park will be marketed as affordable housing. The planned project includes apartment towers of around 30 stories, but mostly buildings under 20 stories and also single-family homes.
