= Chiyo-Kenchōguchi Station =

Metro station in Fukuoka, Japan

Coordinates: 33.6025°N 130.4141°E

H03 Chiyo-Kenchōguchi Station 千代県庁口駅
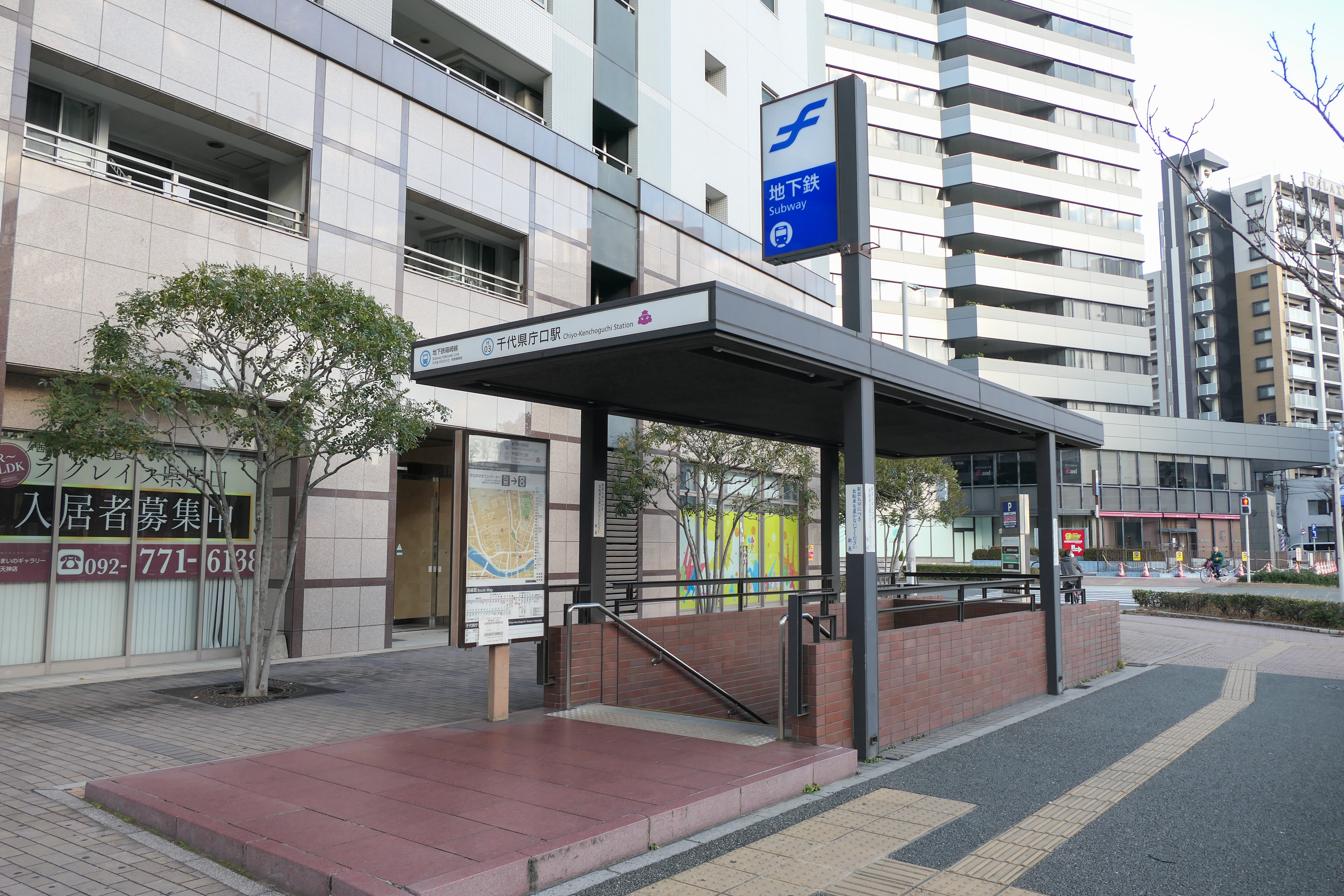

General information
- Location: Hakata, Fukuoka, Fukuoka; Japan
- System: Fukuoka City Subway station
- Operator: Fukuoka City Subway
- Line: Hakozaki Line

Other information
- Station code: H03

History
- Opened: April 27, 1984; 42 years ago

Passengers
- 2006: 3,080 daily

Services
Preceding station	Fukuoka City Subway	Following station
Gofukumachi H02 towards Nakasu-Kawabata	Hakozaki Line	Maidashi-Kyūdai-byōin-mae H04 towards Kaizuka
Location

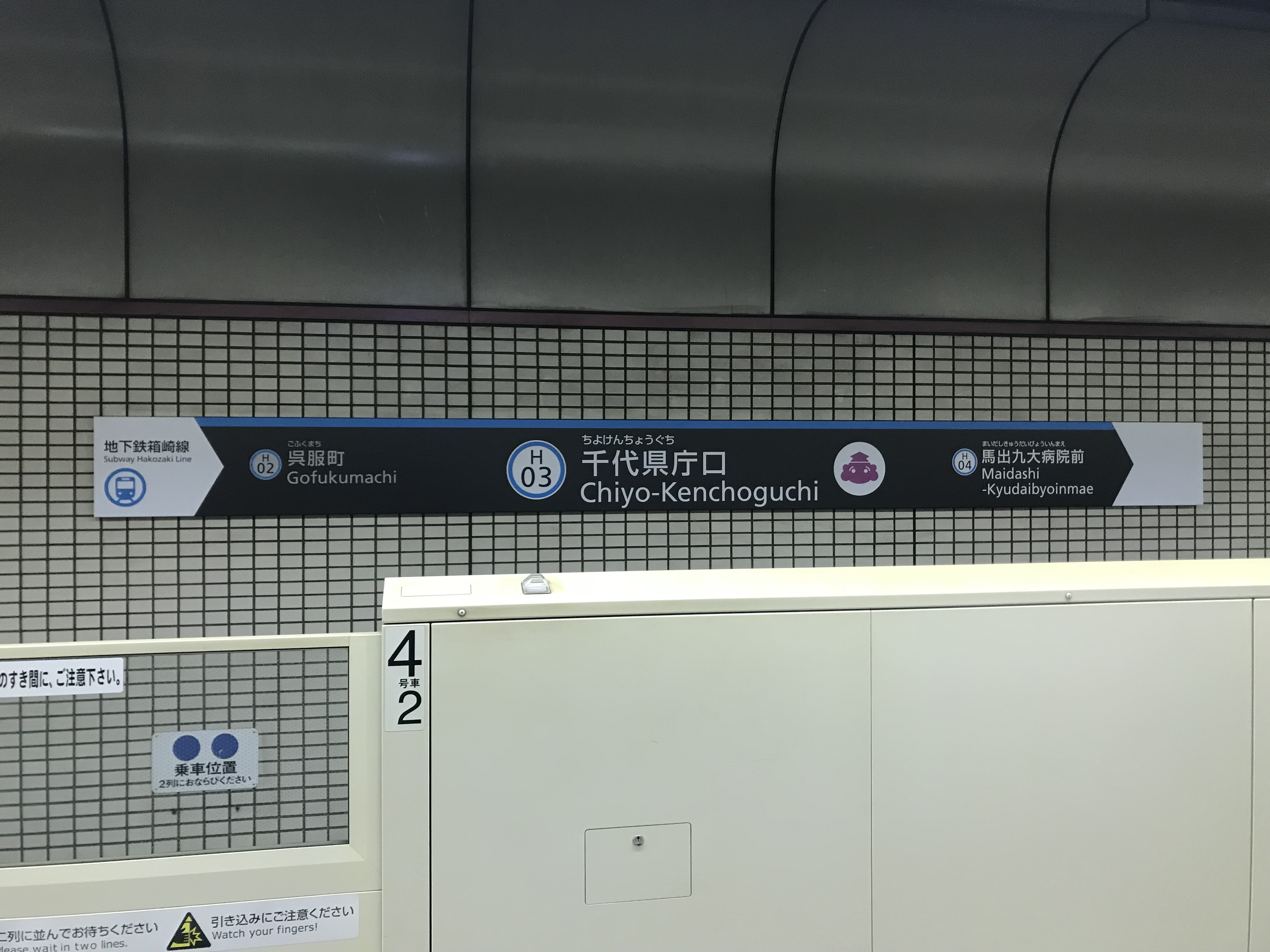
Running in board

Chiyo-Kenchōguchi Station (千代県庁口駅) is a subway station on the Fukuoka City Subway Hakozaki Line in Hakata-ku, Fukuoka, Fukuoka in Japan. Its station symbol is the face of Ebisu in violet. The Tohka-Ebisu Shrine is near this station.

== Lines ==
- Fukuoka City Subway
  - Hakozaki Line

== Platforms ==
1	■ Hakozaki Line	for Kaizuka
2	■ Hakozaki Line	for Nakasu-Kawabata, Nishijin and Meinohama

== Vicinity ==
- Fukuoka Prefectural Government
- Prefectural Police Head Station
- several Elementary and High Schools
- Sofuku-ji Temple
- Higashi Park

== History ==
- September 12, 1983: Decision about building the station
- April 27, 1984: Opening of the station
- January 31, 1986: Line connecting from Hakozaki-Kyūdai-mae

== Other ==
In its planning phase the name "Chiyomachi Station" has been used, due to its location in the Chiyo area. But because it's near the Prefectural Ken (県) Government Agency Chō (庁) the final name is Chiyo-Kenchōguchi.
