= Fukuoka Subway 4000 series =

Japanese electric multiple unit train type

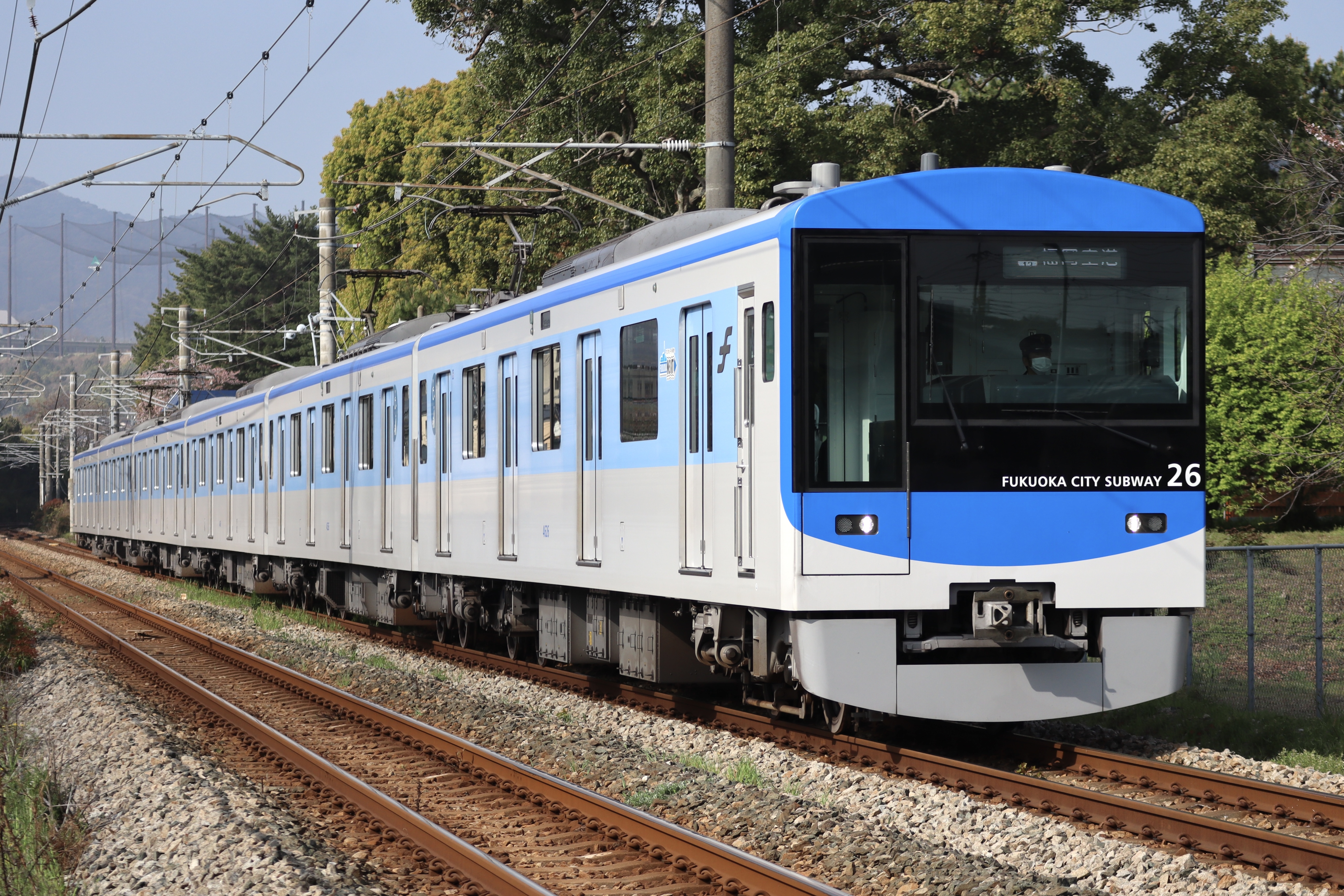
- A 4000 series set in April 2025
- In service: 29 November 2024 – present
- Manufacturer: Kawasaki Railcar Mfg.
- Replaced: 1000N series
- Number under construction: 96 vehicles (16 sets)
- Number built: 12 vehicles (2 sets)
- Formation: 6 cars per trainset
- Operator: Fukuoka City Transportation Bureau
- Lines served: Hakozaki Line; Airport Line; Chikuhi Line

Specifications
- Traction system: SynTRACS
- Traction motors: Synchronous reluctance motor

The Fukuoka Subway 4000 series (福岡市交通局4000系) is an electric multiple unit (EMU) train type operated by the Fukuoka City Transportation Bureau on the Hakozaki Line and Airport Line in Fukuoka, Japan, since 2024. Eighteen 6-car sets are to be built.

== Design ==
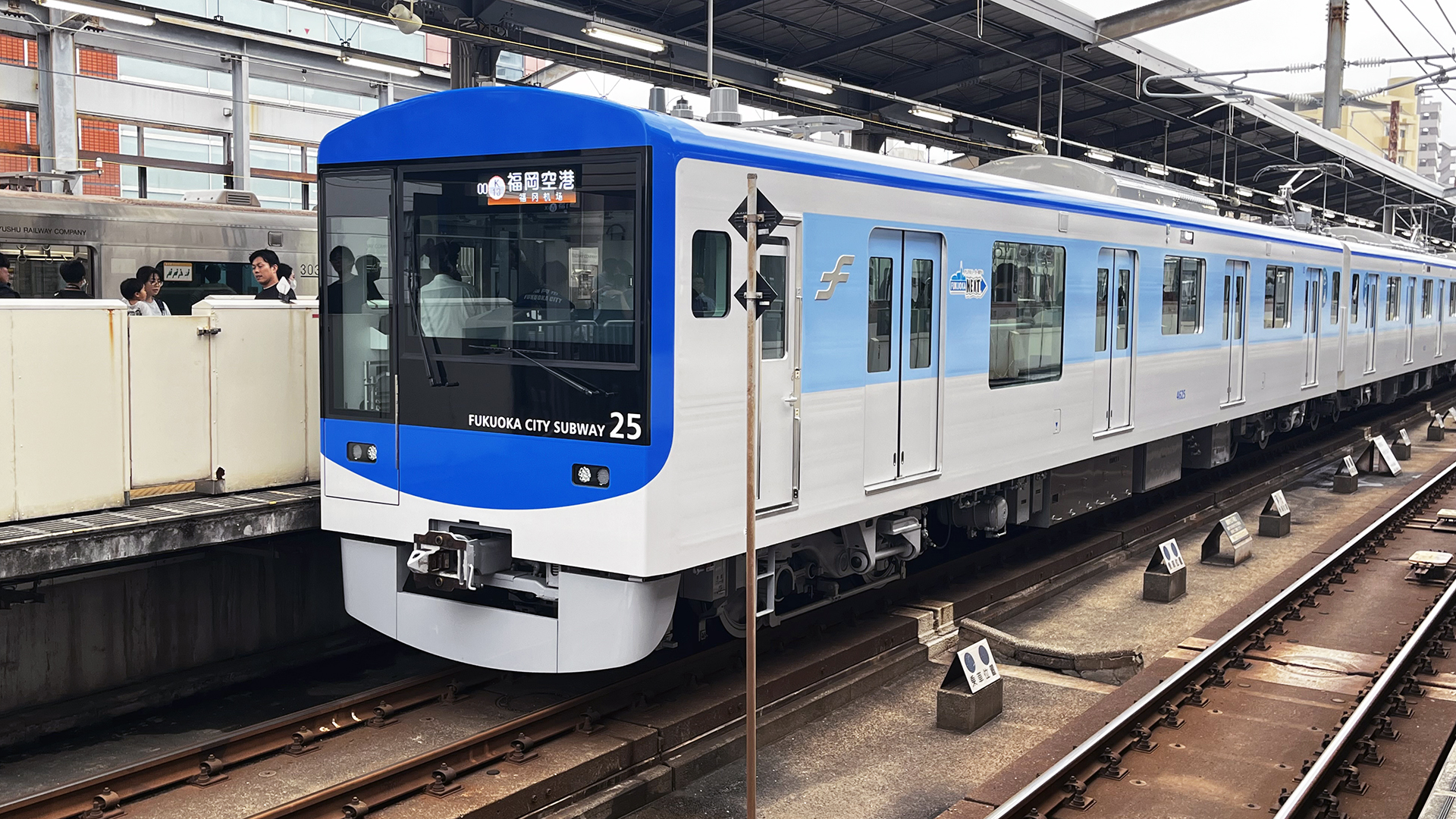
A 4000 series set at Meinohama Station (Opening Day in October 2024 before operating in service)

The 4000 series trains are the first in the world to implement synchronous reluctance motors on a full scale; they are expected to offer 20% energy savings over older, induction motor-driven trains. The trains use bogies with steerable axles to reduce noise on curves.

Internally, the trains use longitudinal seating throughout. With a per-person seat width of 480 millimetres (19 in), the 4000 series features the widest seats of any commuter train in Japan.

== Operations ==
The trains operate on the Airport Line and the Hakozaki Line, as well as the JR Kyushu Chikuhi Line through services.

== History ==
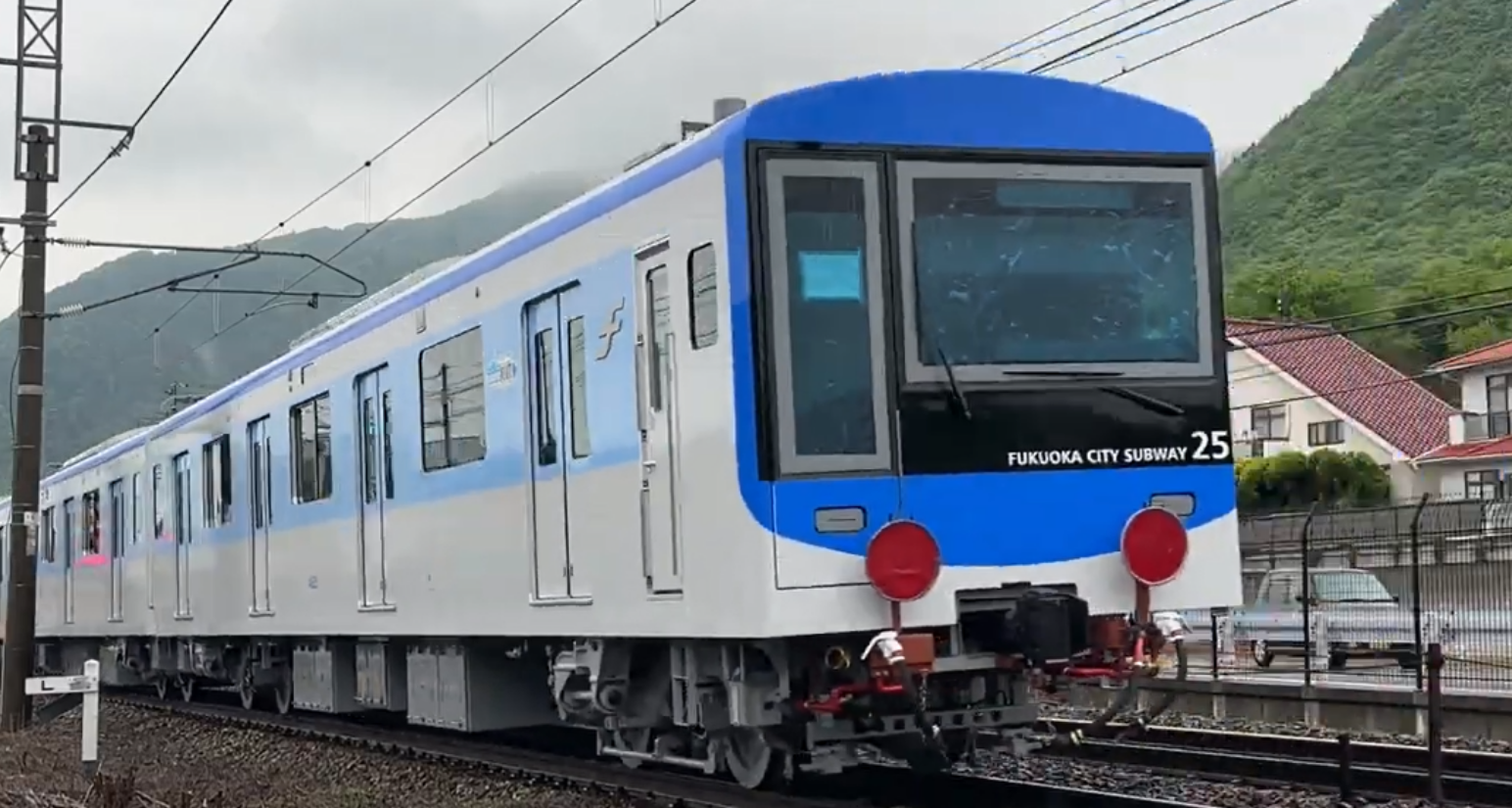
The first 4000 series set on delivery in 2024

In June 2021, the Fukuoka City Transportation Bureau announced that it was seeking out manufacturers to build a fleet of 108 new vehicles to replace its fleet of 1000N series trains. It was announced on 7 February 2022 by Kawasaki Heavy Industries that its rolling stock division, Kawasaki Railcar Manufacturing, would produce the new trains at a cost of approximately ¥10 billion (2022) (equivalent to ¥10.61 billion or US$70.11 million in 2024).

Details of the trains were first announced by the Fukuoka City Transportation Bureau on 30 November 2023.

The first set, 25, was delivered from the Kawasaki Railcar Manufacturing plant in Hyogo from 23 April 2024. By October 2024, two sets had been delivered.

The type entered revenue service on 29 November 2024.

In May 2025, the 4000 series received the Laurel Prize, presented annually by the Japan Railfan Club.

== See also ==
- Tokyo Metro 1000 series – introduced steerable bogies and synchronous motors on the Tokyo Metro Ginza Line in 2012
- Kintetsu 8A series – 2025 Laurel Prize co-recipient
