= Hakozaki-Miyamae Station =

Metro station in Fukuoka, Japan

Coordinates: 33.6160°N 130.4195°E

H05 Hakozaki-Miyamae Station 箱崎宮前駅
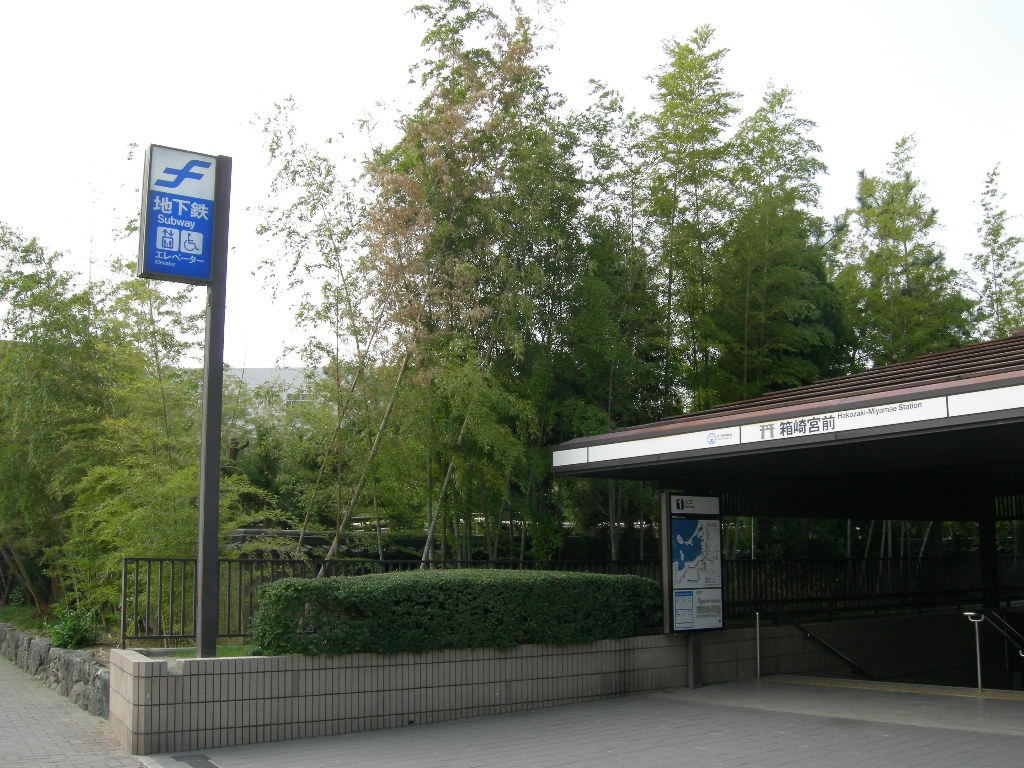

General information
- Location: Higashi, Fukuoka, Fukuoka; Japan
- System: Fukuoka City Subway station
- Operator: Fukuoka City Subway
- Line: Hakozaki Line

Other information
- Station code: H05

History
- Opened: 31 January 1986; 40 years ago

Passengers
- 2006: 2,567 daily

Services
Preceding station	Fukuoka City Subway	Following station
Maidashi-Kyūdai-byōin-mae H04 towards Nakasu-Kawabata	Hakozaki Line	Hakozaki-Kyūdai-mae H06 towards Kaizuka
Location

Hakozaki-Miyamae Station (箱崎宮前駅) is a subway station on the Fukuoka City Subway Hakozaki Line in Higashi-ku, Fukuoka in Japan. Its station symbol is the gate (Torii) of the Hakozaki Shrine in grey.

== Lines ==
- Fukuoka City Subway
  - Hakozaki Line

== Platforms ==
1	■ Hakozaki Line	for Kaizuka
2	■ Hakozaki Line	for Nakasu-Kawabata, Nishijin and Meinohama

== Vicinity ==
- Hakozaki Shrine
- Hakozaki - Kyūshū Railway Company : Kagoshima Main Line
- Higashi ward office
- Higashi Health Center
- Fukuoka Prefectural Library

== History ==
- September 12, 1983: Decision to build the Station. Tentative name: Hakozaki station.
- January 31, 1986: Opening of the station.

== Other ==
A temporary staffed entrance gate is set up during the Hakozaki Shrine festival.
