= Gofukumachi Station (Fukuoka) =

Metro station in Fukuoka, Japan

Coordinates: 33°35′54″N 130°24′36″E

H02 Gofukumachi Station 呉服町駅
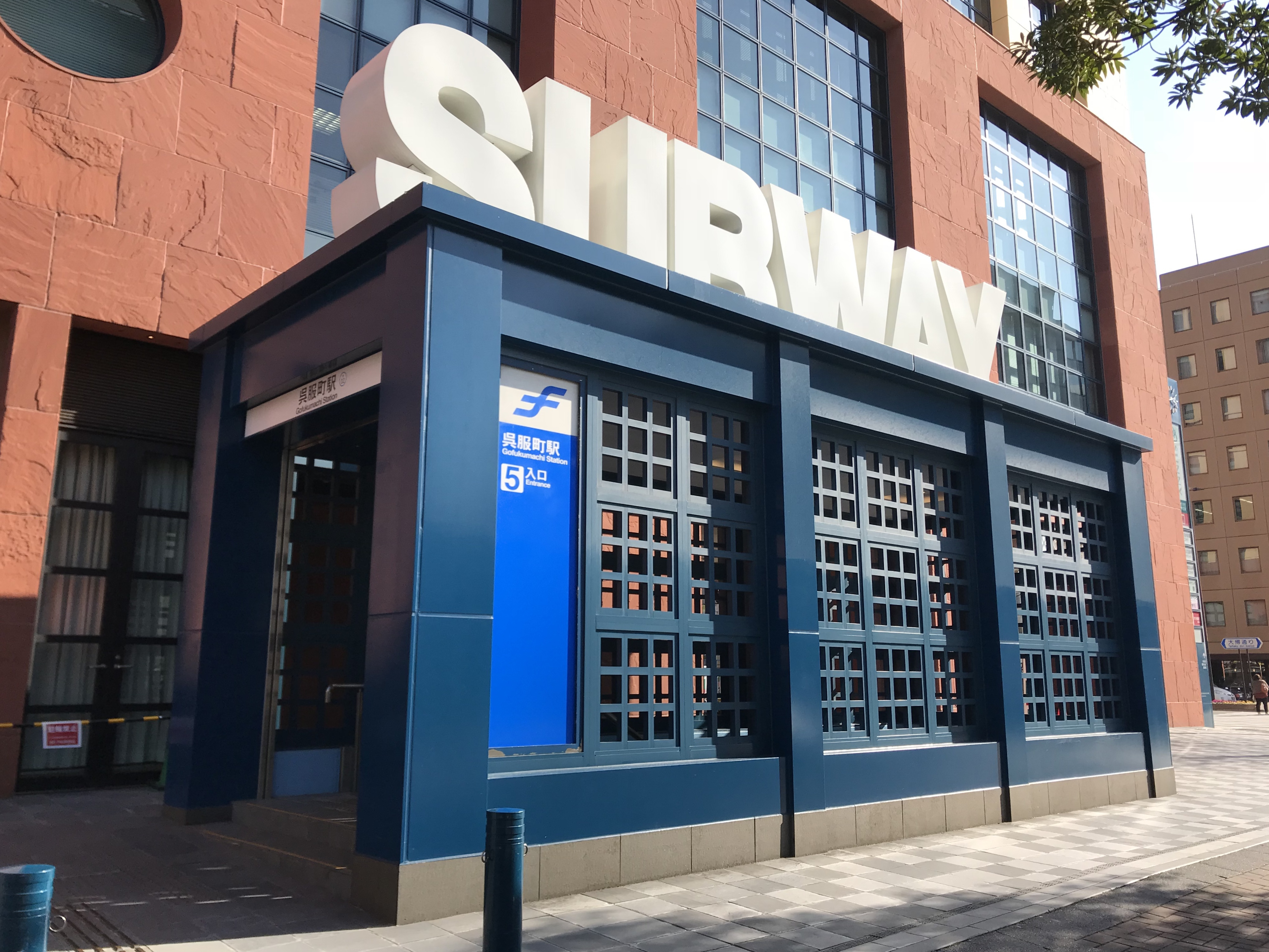
- No. 1 Exit

General information
- Location: Hakata, Fukuoka, Fukuoka; Japan
- System: Fukuoka City Subway station
- Operator: Fukuoka City Subway
- Line: Hakozaki Line

Other information
- Station code: H02

History
- Opened: 20 April 1982; 44 years ago

Passengers
- 2006: 2,504 daily

Services
Preceding station	Fukuoka City Subway	Following station
Nakasu-Kawabata H01 Terminus	Hakozaki Line	Chiyo-Kenchōguchi H03 towards Kaizuka
Location

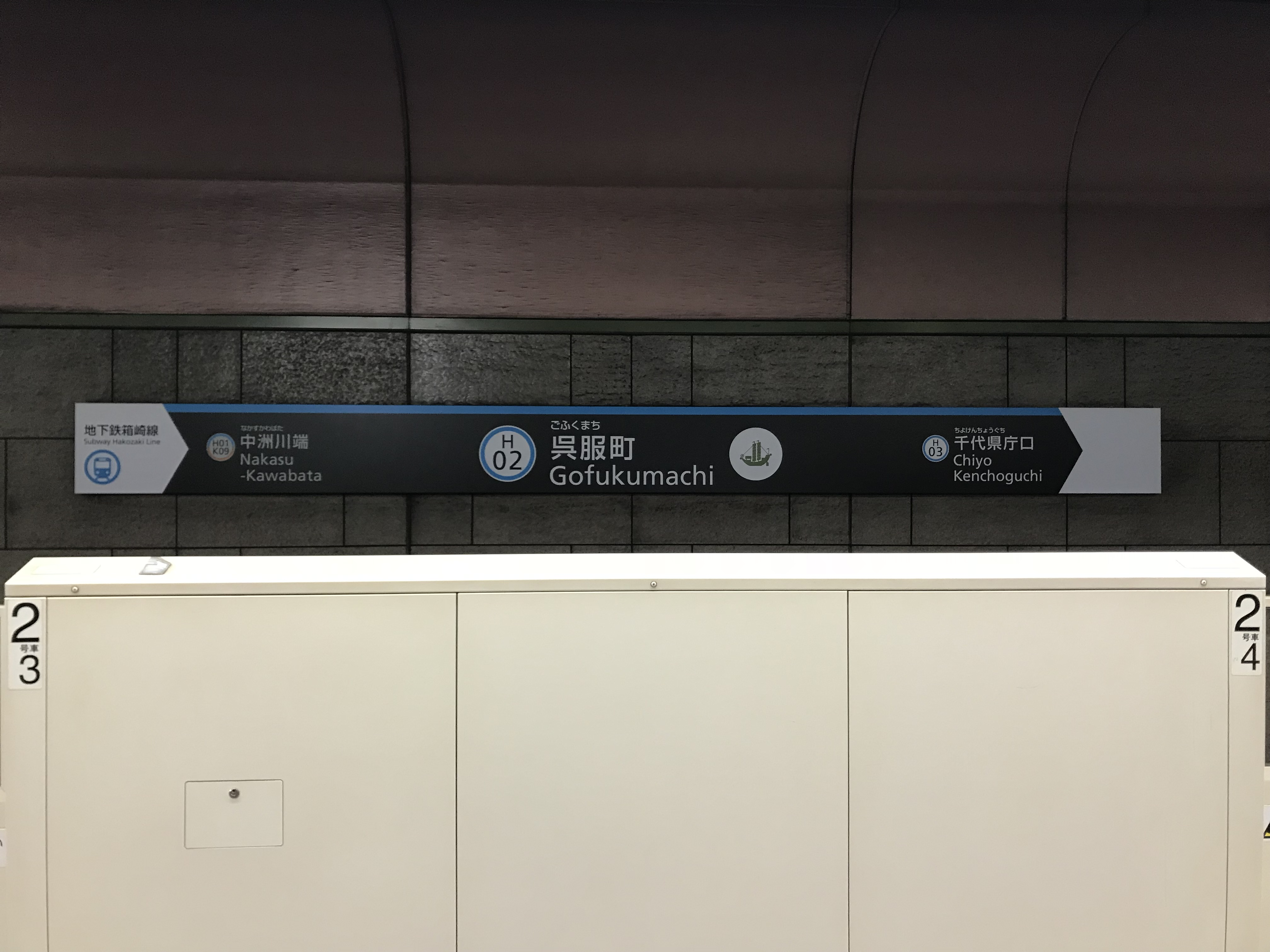
Running in board

Gofukumachi Station (呉服町駅, Gofukumachi-eki) is a Fukuoka City Subway station located in Hakata-ku, Fukuoka in Japan. Its station symbol is a green trading ship from the Heian period.

== Lines ==
The station is served by the Hakozaki Line.

== Platforms ==
1	■ Hakozaki Line	for Kaizuka
2	■ Hakozaki Line	for Nakasu-Kawabata, Nishijin and Meinohama

== History ==
The station opened on 20 April 1982.

== Vicinity ==
- Meiji Street
- Urban Expressway
