= Hakozaki-Kyūdai-mae Station =

Metro station in Fukuoka, Japan

Coordinates: 33.6221°N 130.4209°E

H06 Hakozaki-Kyūdai-mae Station 箱崎九大前駅
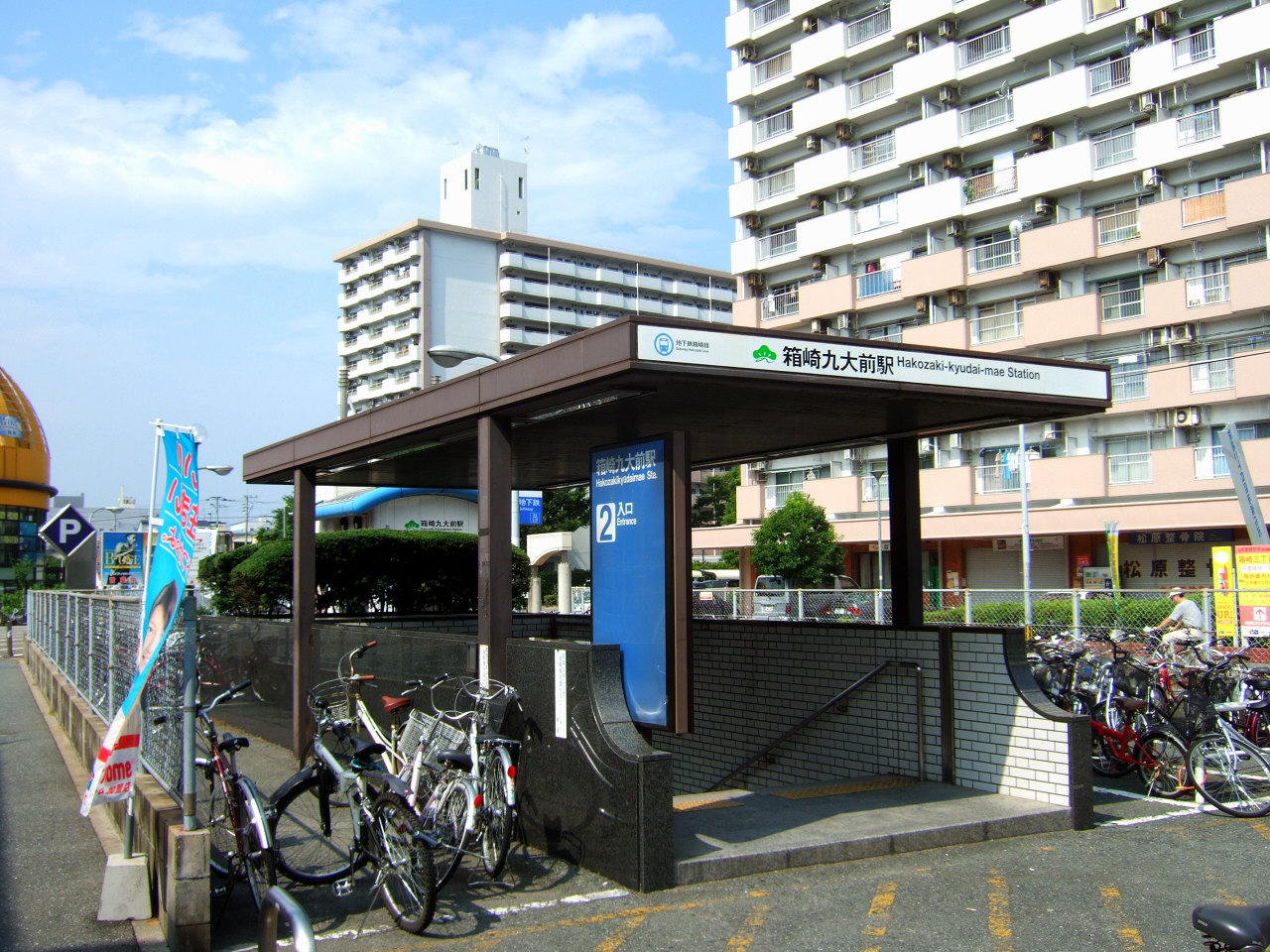

General information
- Location: Higashi, Fukuoka, Fukuoka; Japan
- System: Fukuoka City Subway station
- Operator: Fukuoka City Subway
- Line: Hakozaki Line

Other information
- Station code: H06

History
- Opened: 31 January 1986; 40 years ago

Services
Preceding station	Fukuoka City Subway	Following station
Hakozaki-Miyamae H05 towards Nakasu-Kawabata	Hakozaki Line	Kaizuka H07 Terminus
Location

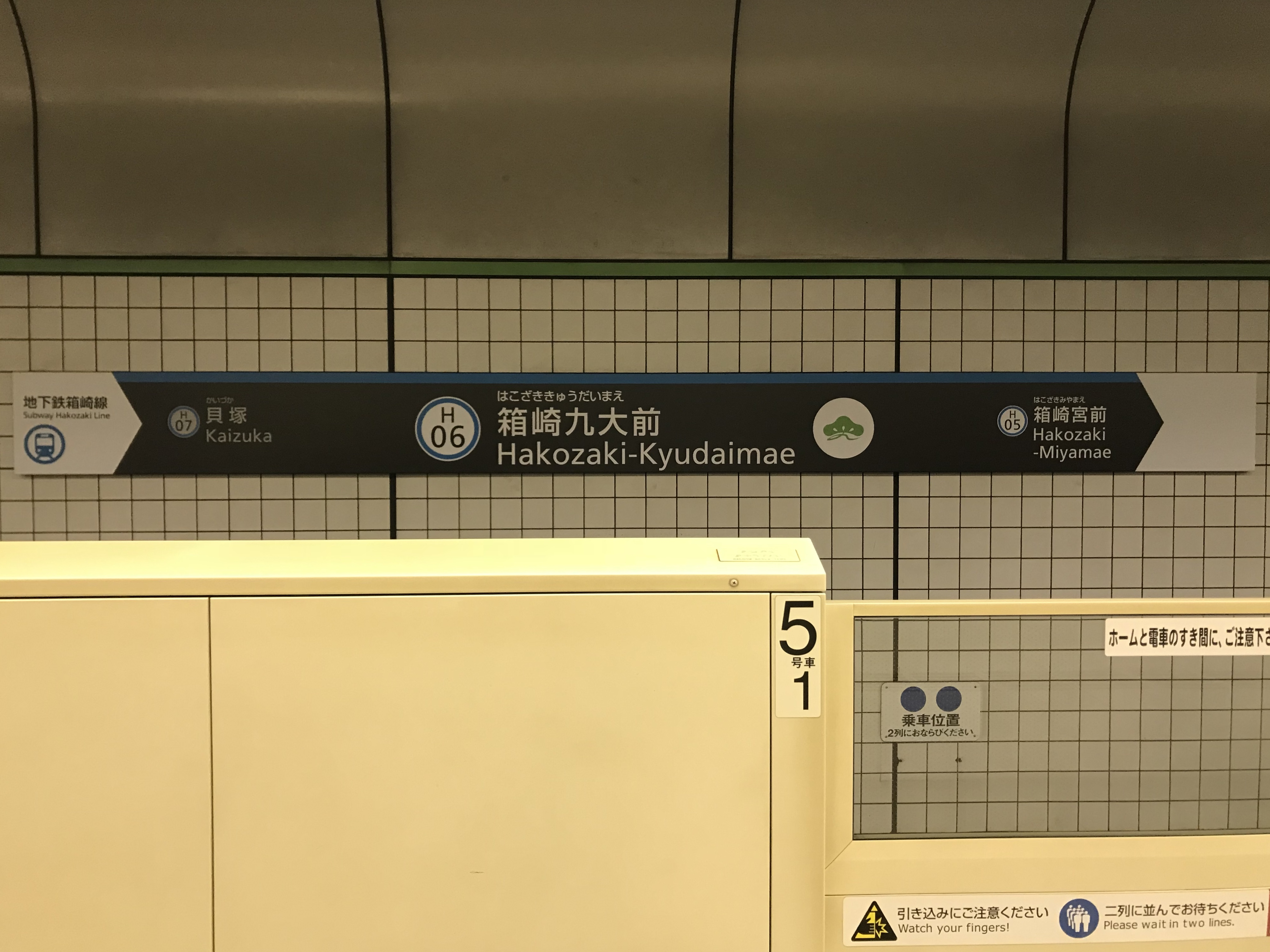
Running in board

Hakozaki-Kyūdai-mae Station (箱崎九大前駅, Hakozaki-Kyūdai-mae-eki) is a subway station on the Fukuoka City Subway Hakozaki Line in Higashi-ku, Fukuoka, Japan. Kyūdai-mae means "in front of Kyushu University". Its station symbol is a pine branch with leaves that look like Kyushu University's initials Chinese character 九, because a pine‐covered area is named Ciyono-matsubara (千代の松原) is near this station.

== Lines ==
Hakozaki-Kyūdai-mae Station is served by the Fukuoka City Subway Hakozaki Line.

== Platforms ==
1	■ Hakozaki Line	for Kaizuka
2	■ Hakozaki Line	for Nakasu-Kawabata, Nishijin, and Meinohama

== History ==
The station opened on January 31, 1986.

== Surrounding area ==
- Kyushu University
- Hakozaki Station, on the Kagoshima Main Line
