= Maidashi-Kyūdai-byōin-mae Station =

Metro station in Fukuoka, Japan

Coordinates: 33.6096°N 130.4194°E

H04 Maidashi-Kyūdaibyōinmae Station 馬出九大病院前駅
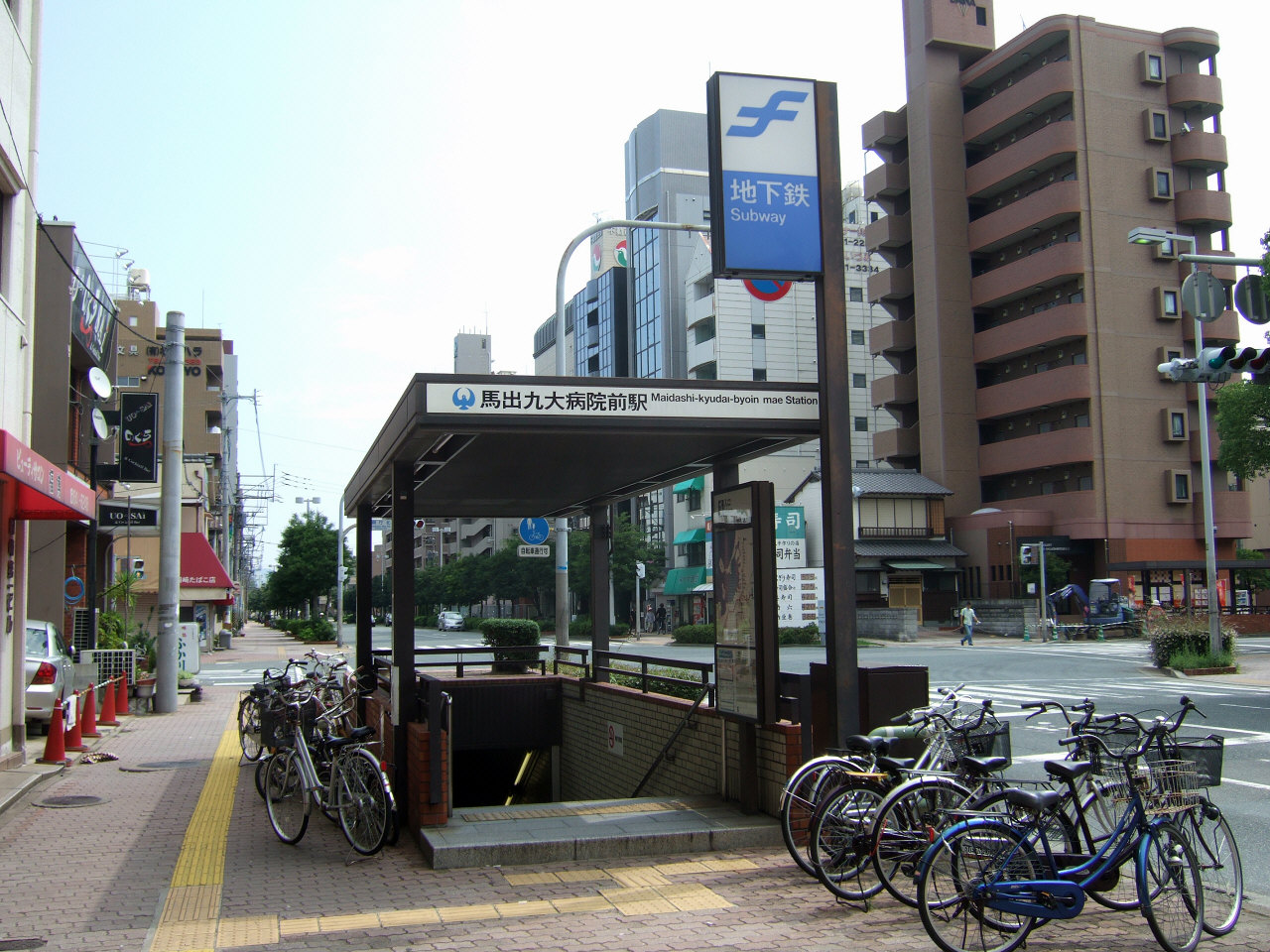
- Station entrance

General information
- Location: Higashi, Fukuoka, Fukuoka; Japan
- System: Fukuoka City Subway station
- Operator: Fukuoka City Subway
- Line: Hakozaki Line
- Connections: JR Kyushu (Yoshizuka Station)

Other information
- Station code: H04

History
- Opened: April 27, 1984; 42 years ago

Services
Preceding station	Fukuoka City Subway	Following station
Chiyo-Kenchōguchi H03 towards Nakasu-Kawabata	Hakozaki Line	Hakozaki-Miyamae H05 towards Kaizuka
Location

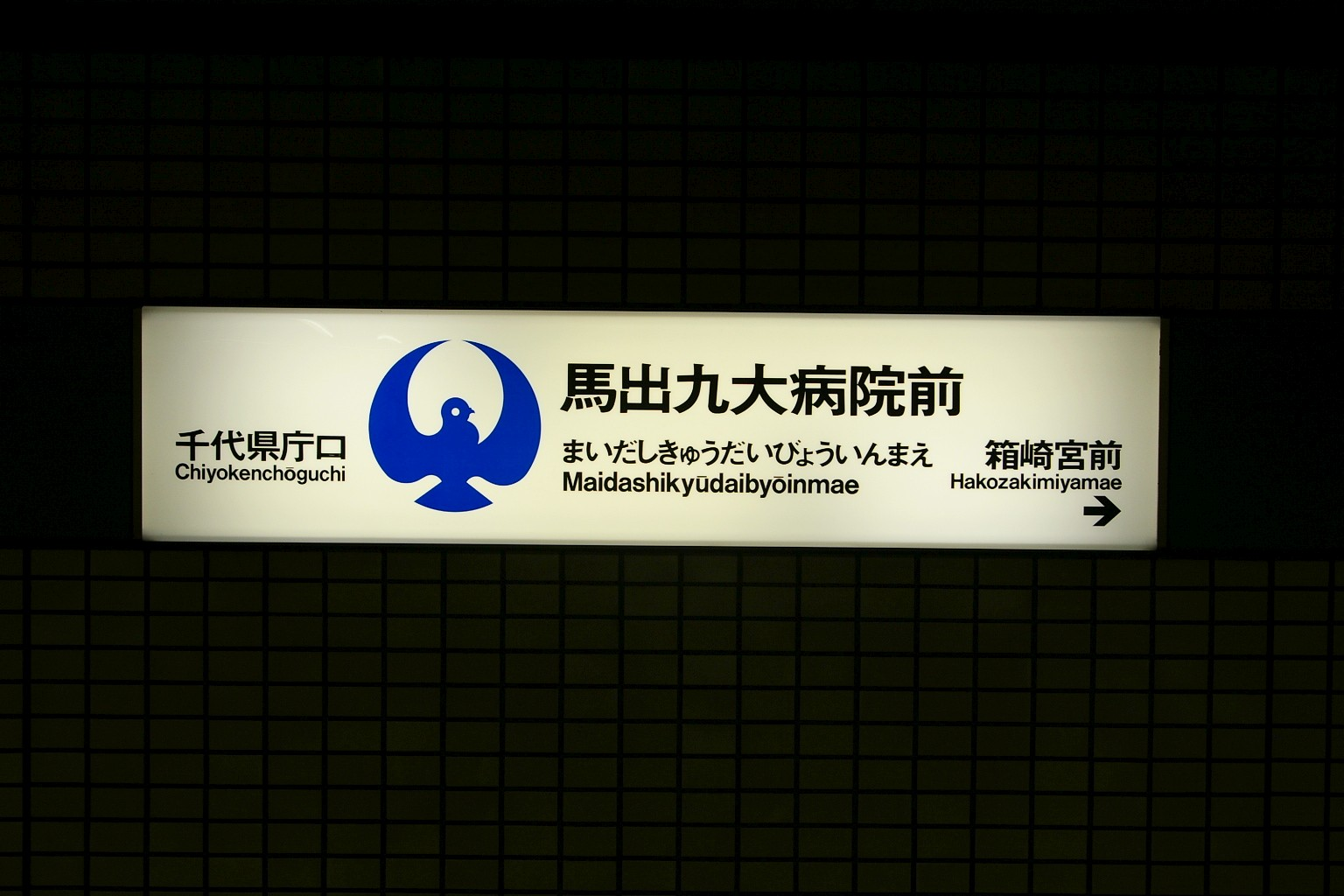
Station sign and symbol

Maidashi-Kyūdaibyōinmae Station (馬出九大病院前駅, Maidashi-kyūdai-byōin-mae-eki) is a subway station on the Fukuoka City Subway Hakozaki Line in Fukuoka, Japan.

The station's name, which is the longest for a Japan subway station, means "Front of Kyushu University Hospital in Maidashi". Chiyo-Kenchōguchi Station is, however, closer to the hospital. Maidashi-kyūdai byōin mae is the station closest to the Prefectural Government office. The symbol on the sign is a dove, representing peace and nursing (a reference to the nearby hospital).

== Station layout ==
The station consists of one island platform located in the second basement, serving two tracks.

== History ==
The station opened on 27 April 1984 as a terminus of the subway line.

== Surrounding area ==
- Fukuoka Prefectural Government Office
- Fukuoka Prefectural Police Headquarters
- Hakata Revenue Office
- Kyushu University (medical school, dental School, school of medicine, attached to hospital)
- Hakata girls' high school and junior high school
- Fukuoka city Maidashi elementary school
- Nagatsuka-bushi song memorial
- Higashi Park
- Maidashi ryokuchi
