= Fukuoka Subway 2000 series =

Japanese train type

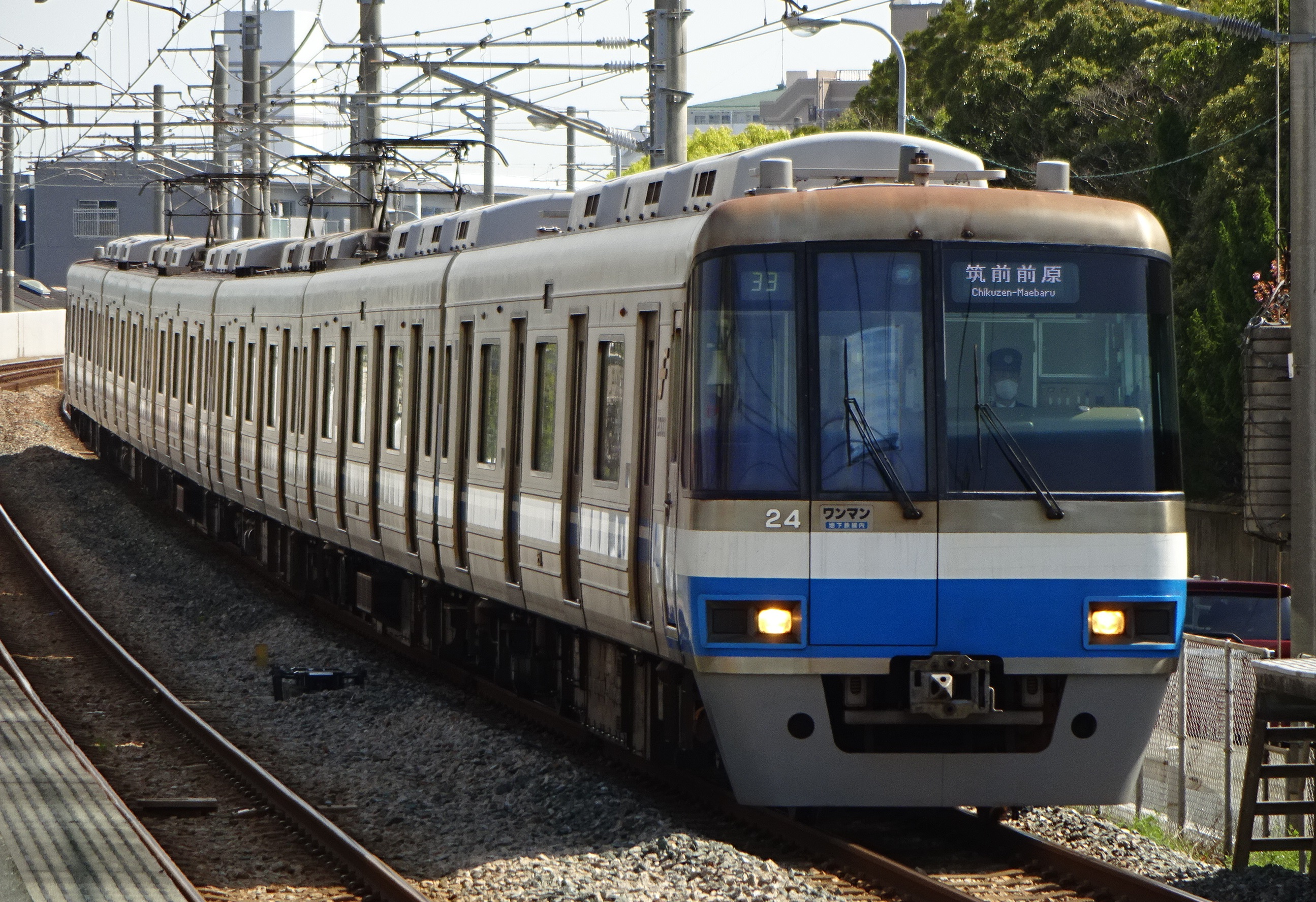
- 2000 series set 24 on the Chikuhi Line in 2016
- Manufacturers: Kinki Sharyo, Kawasaki Heavy Industries, Nippon Sharyo
- Constructed: 1992–1998
- Entered service: 1993
- Refurbished: 2015–2016
- Number built: 36 vehicles (6 trainsets)
- Number in service: 36 vehicles (6 trainsets)
- Formation: 6 cars per trainset
- Fleet numbers: 19-24
- Capacity: 854
- Operator: Fukuoka City Transportation Bureau
- Depot: Meinohama
- Lines served: Hakozaki Line, Airport Line, Chikuhi Line

Specifications
- Car body construction: Stainless steel
- Car length: 20 m (65 ft 7 in)
- Width: 2.860m
- Doors: 4 pairs per side
- Maximum speed: 110 km/h (68 mph)
- Acceleration: 3.5 km/(h⋅s) (2.2 mph/s)
- Deceleration: 3.5 km/(h⋅s) (2.2 mph/s) (service); 4 km/(h⋅s) (2.5 mph/s) (emergency brake)
- Electric system: 1,500 V DC overhead catenary
- Braking systems: Regenerative brake, brake-by-wire
- Safety systems: ATC, ATO, ATS, Dead man's switch
- Track gauge: 1,067 mm (3 ft 6 in)

The Fukuoka Subway 2000 series (福岡市交通局2000系) is an electric multiple unit (EMU) train type operated by Fukuoka City Transportation Bureau on the Hakozaki and Airport subway lines in Fukuoka, Japan, since 1993.

Renewals have been carried out sequentially since 2021, and the updated cars have been changed to 2000N series.

== Operations ==
The fleet of six 6-car 2000 series trains are based at Meinohama depot and are used alongside the Fukuoka Subway 1000 series on the Hakozaki and Airport subway lines, and also through-running services to and from the Chikuhi Line owned by Kyushu Railway Company (JR Kyushu).

== Design ==
The trains have stainless steel bodies. Each car is 20 m (65 ft 7 in) long with four pairs of doors on each side, air conditioning, and space to accommodate wheelchairs. The longitudinal seats are covered with a green moquette.

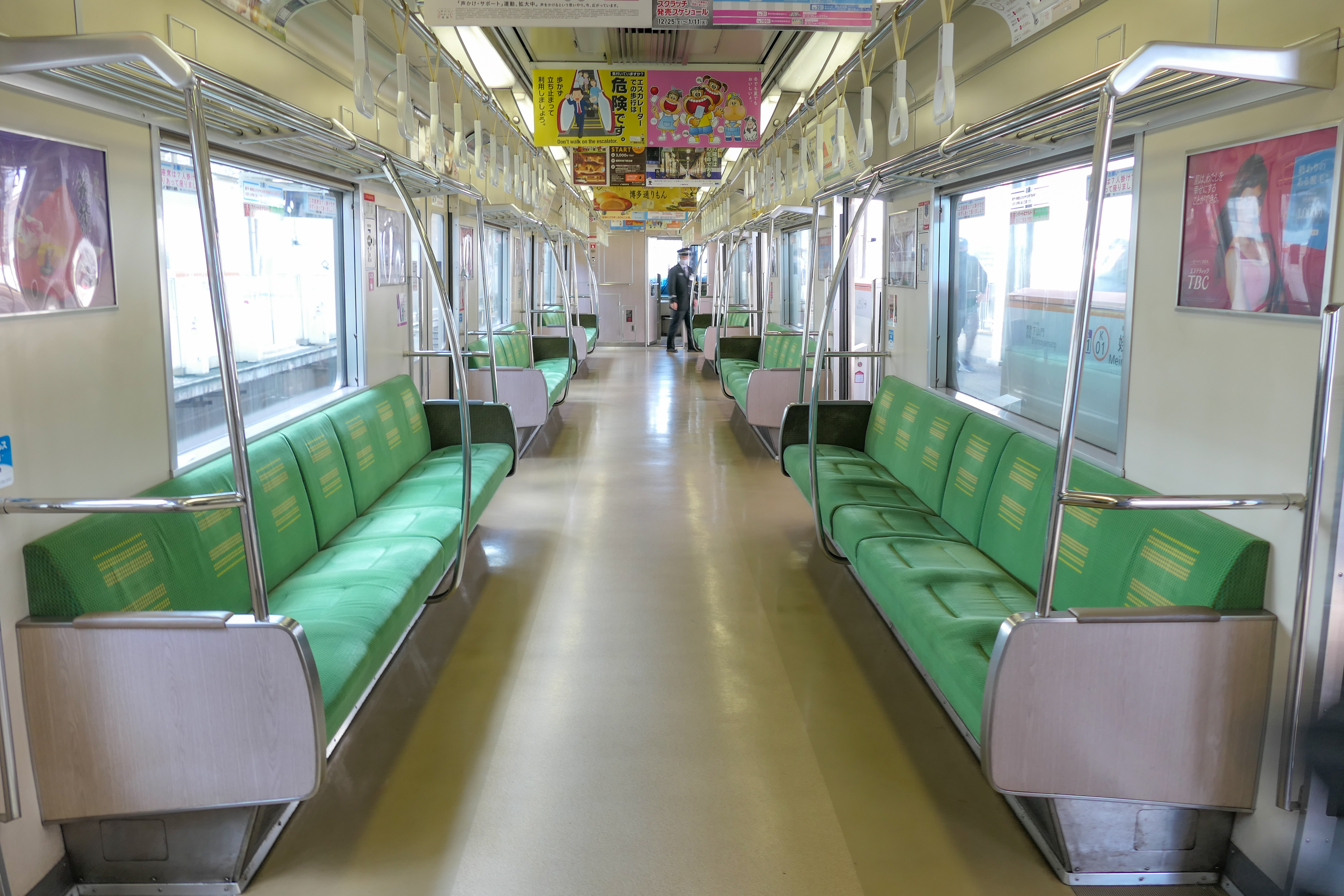
Interior view (2000 series)

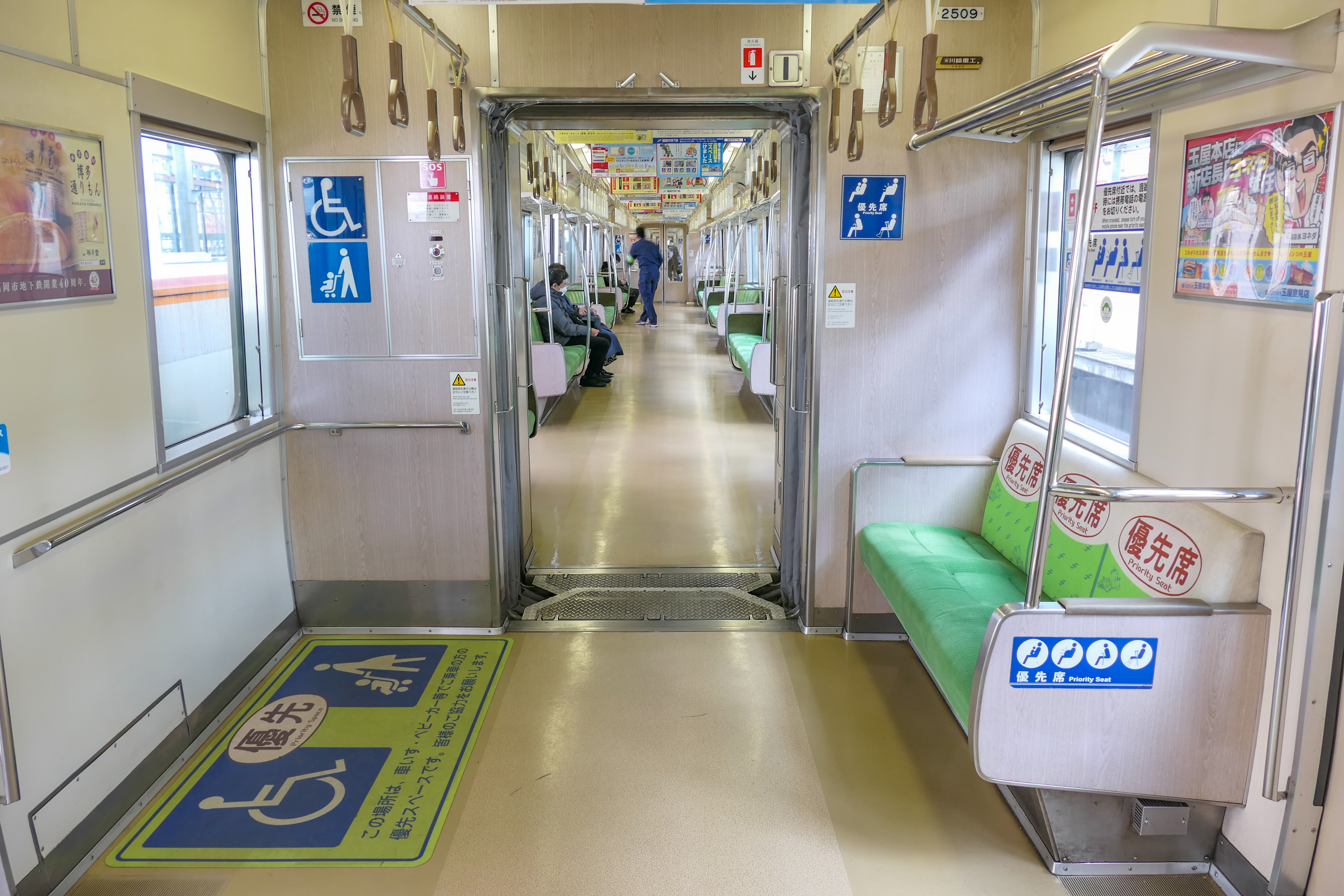
Priority seating (2000 series)

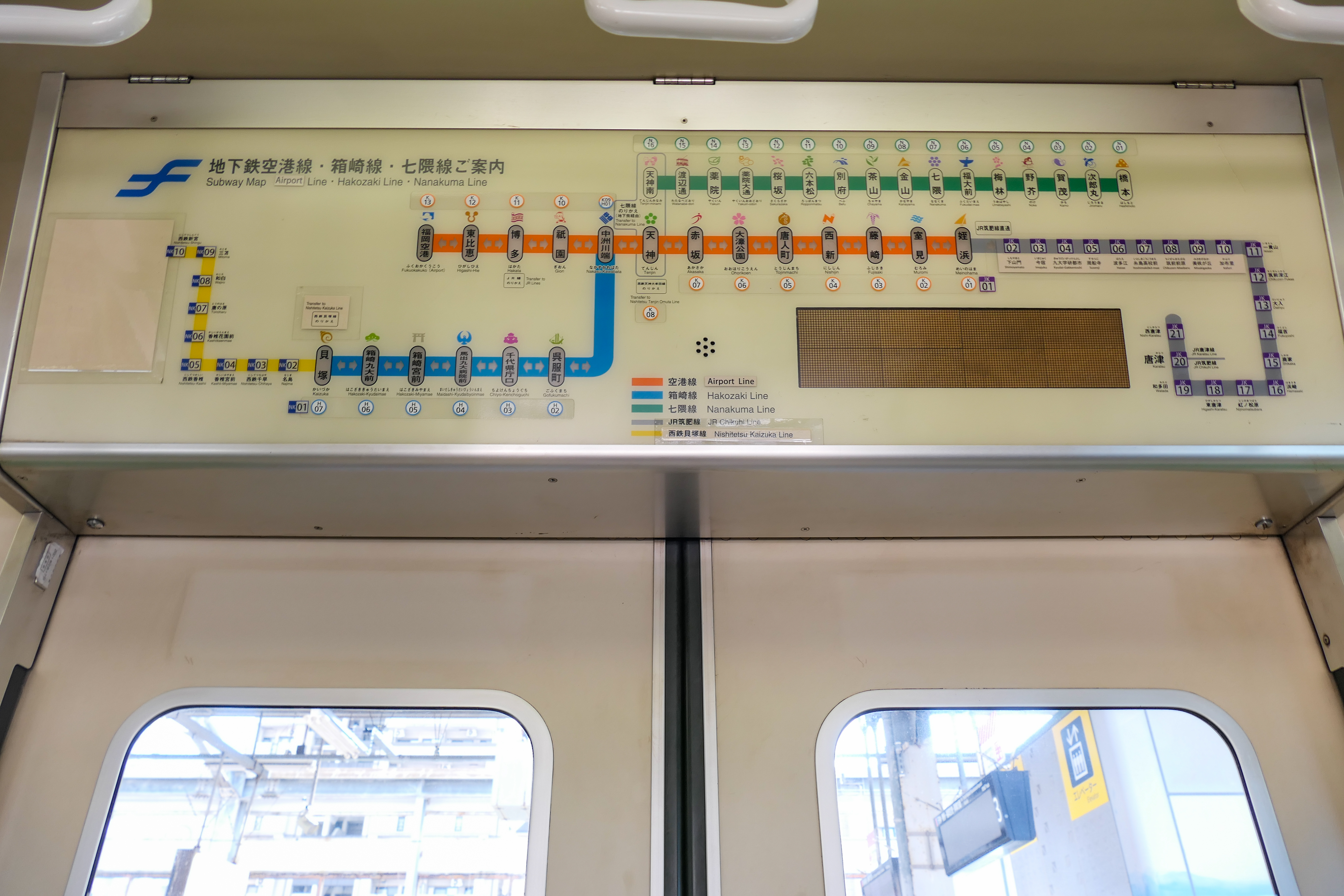
LED passenger information display (2000 series)

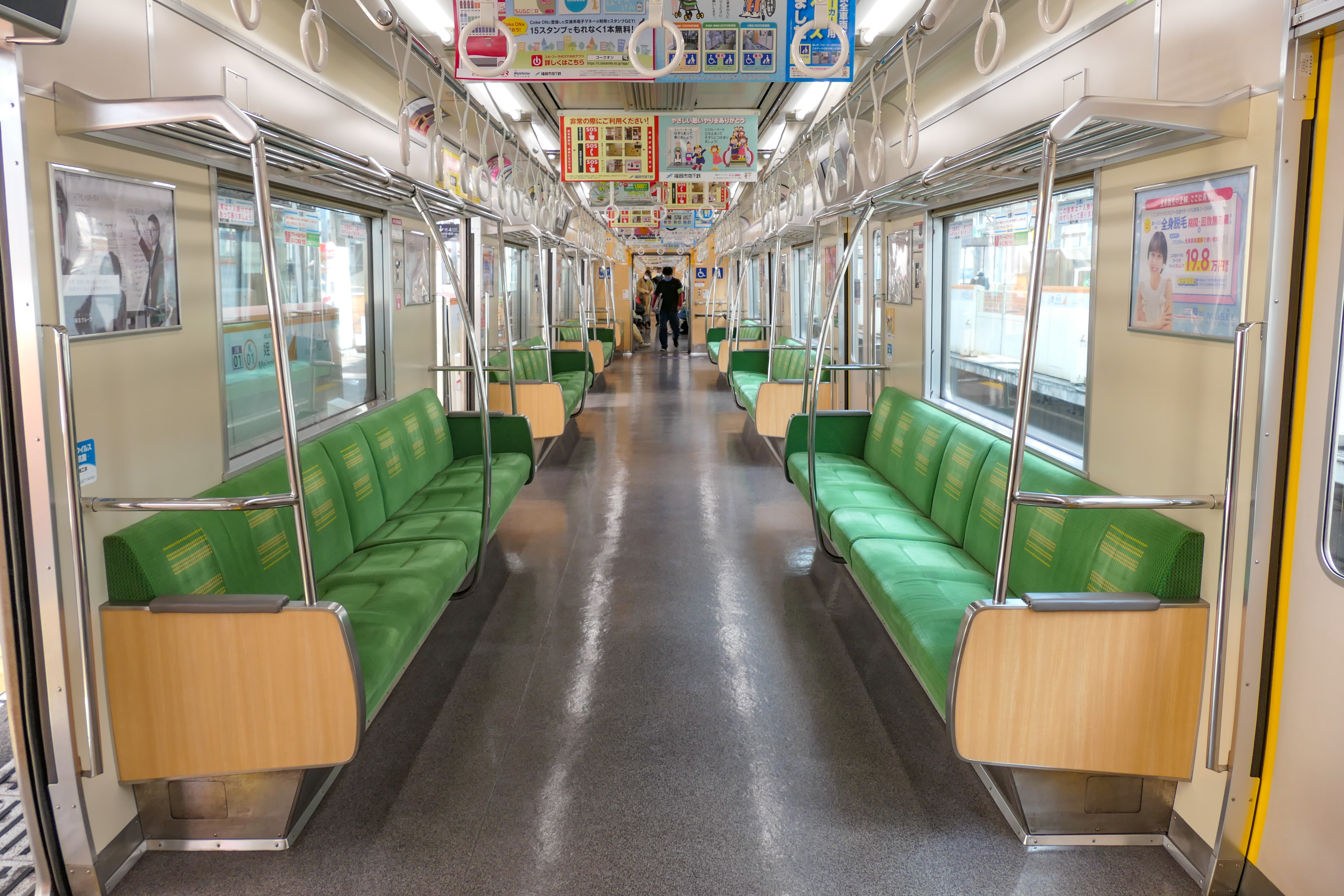
Interior view (2000N series)

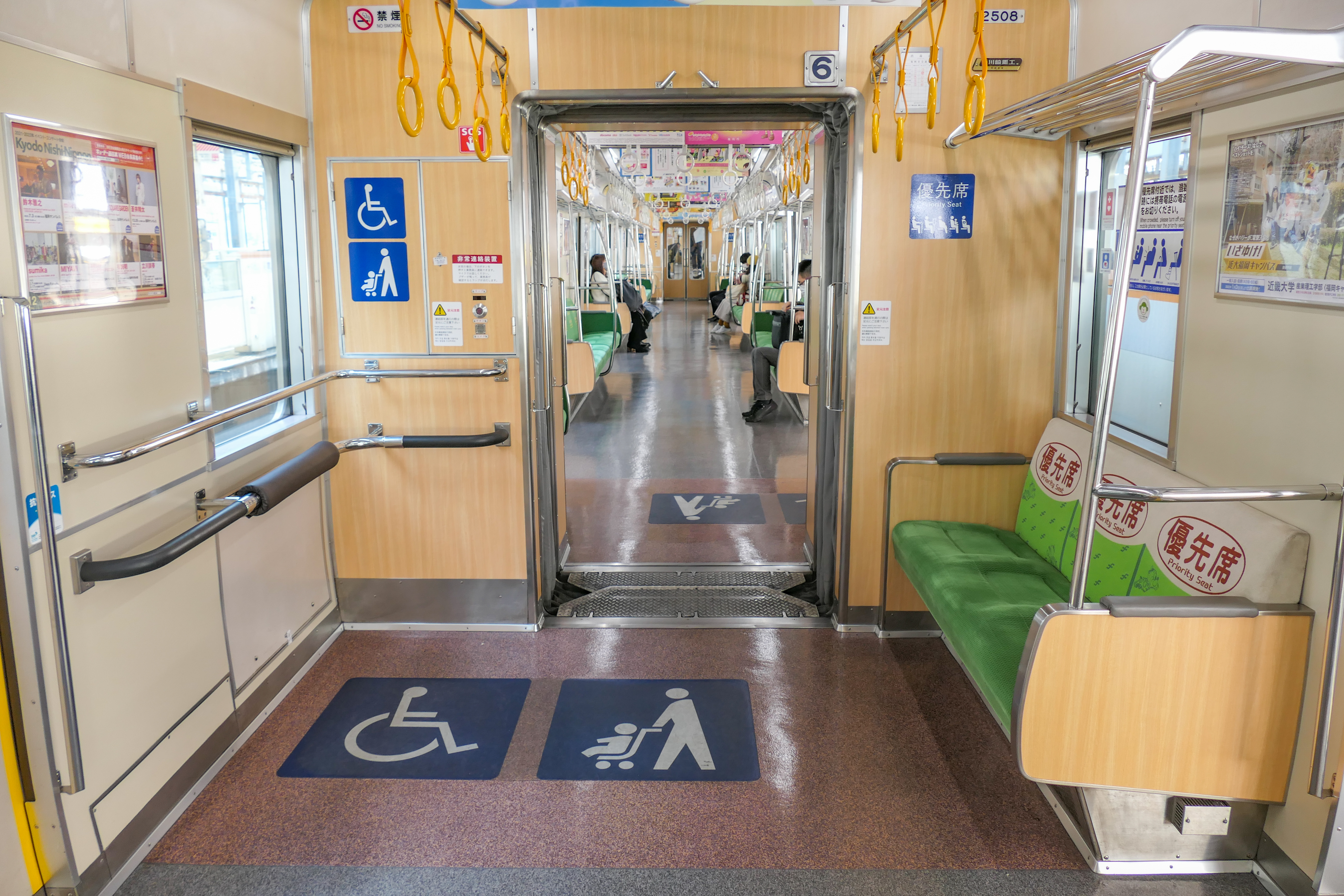
Priority seating (2000N series)

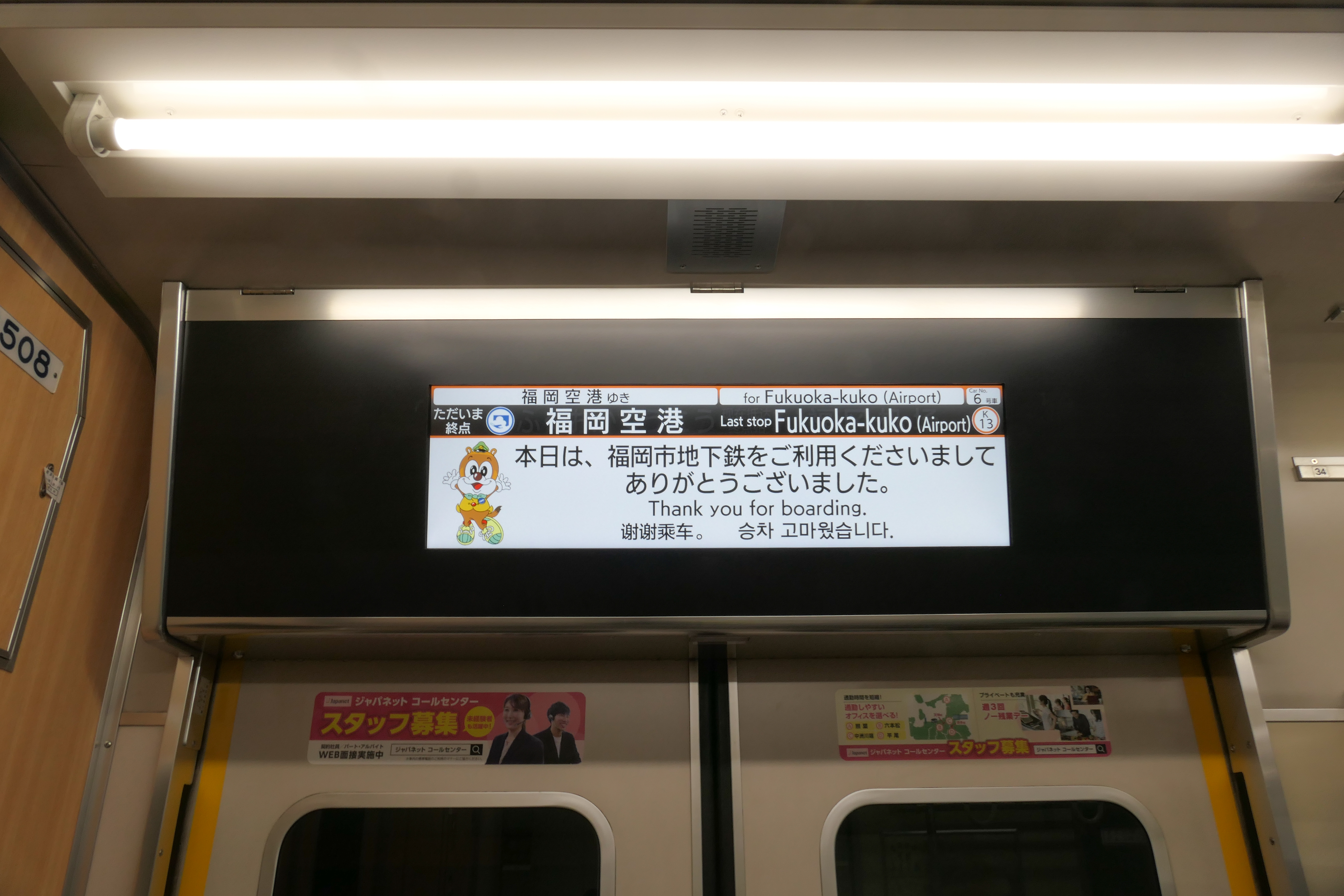
LCD passenger information display (2000N series)

== Formations ==
As of 1 April 2014, the fleet consists of six 6-car sets consisting of four motored ("M") cars and two non-powered trailer ("T") cars, formed as shown below with car 1 at the Meinohama end.

Car No.	1	2	3	4	5	6
Designation	Tc	M1	M1'	M2	M2'	Tc'
Numbering	2500	2000	2100	2000	2100	2500
Weight (t)	29	34.5	35	34.5	35	29
Capacity (total)	135	146				135

- Cars 3 and 5 each have two cross-arm pantographs.
- Car 5 is designated as a mildly air-conditioned car.

== History ==
The 2000 series was introduced in 1993.

A refurbishment program was carried out on all six 2000 series sets between 2015 and 2017. The destination signs were replaced with multilingual four-color destination signs and the interior seating arrangement was changed.

After that, the 2000N series, which has been renewed mainly underfloor equipment and interior decoration of the main circuit equipment and auxiliary power supply equipment, has completed all renovation work, has started operating on January 7, 2021.
