= Hakozaki Line =

Subway line in Fukuoka prefecture, Japan

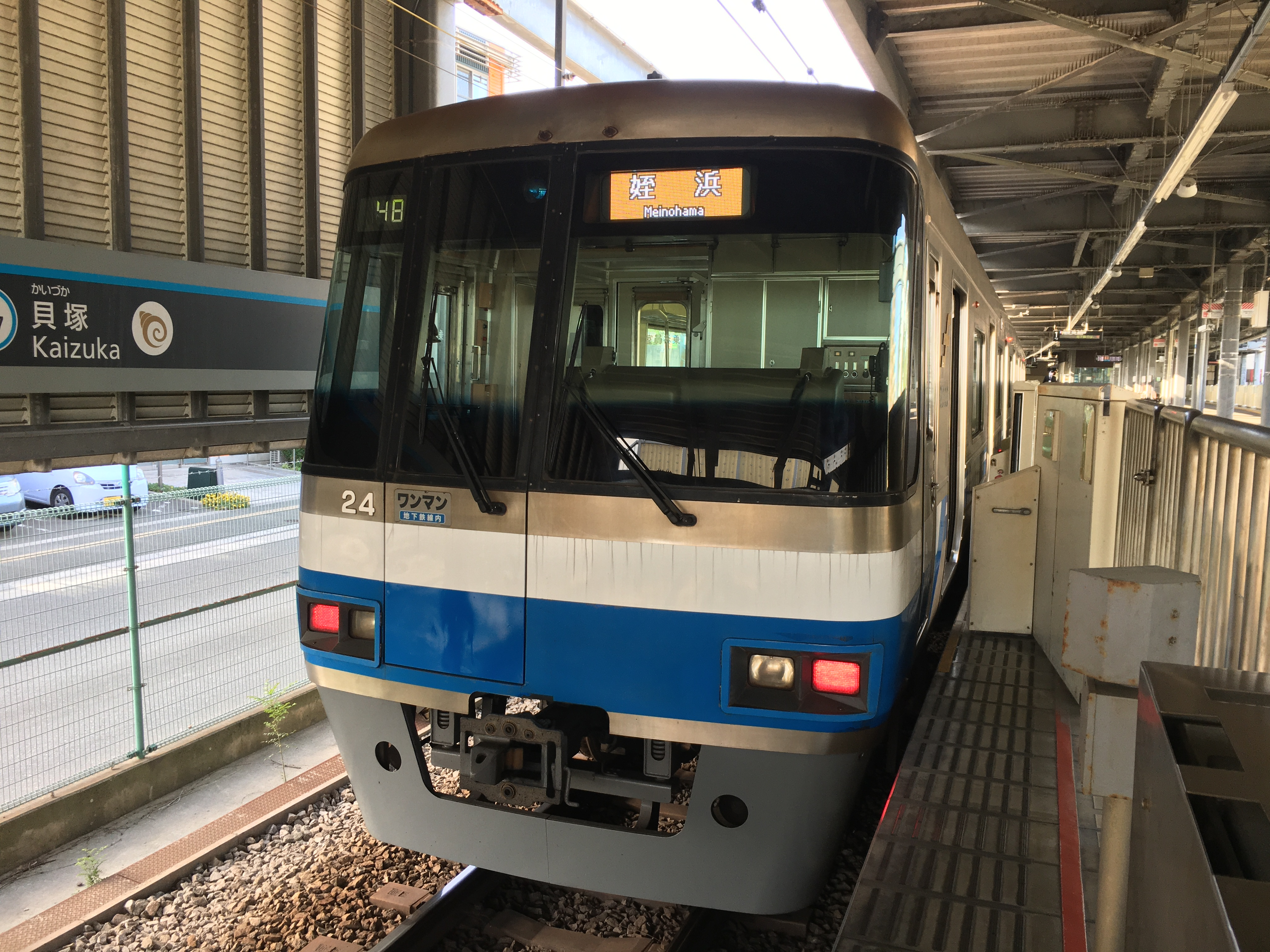
- Fukuoka City Subway 2000 series train

Overview
- Native name: 箱崎線
- Owner: Fukuoka City Subway
- Locale: Fukuoka
- Termini: Nakasu-Kawabata; Kaizuka
- Color on map: Blue

Service
- Type: Rapid transit
- System: Fukuoka City Subway
- Services: 7
- Rolling stock: 1000 series, 2000 series

History
- Opened: 20 April 1982; 44 years ago
- Last extension: 1986

Technical
- Line length: 4.7 km (2.9 mi)
- Track gauge: 1,067 mm (3 ft 6 in)
- Minimum radius: 176 m (577 ft)
- Electrification: 1,500 V DC overhead catenary
- Operating speed: 75 km/h (45 mph)

The Hakozaki Line (箱崎線, Hakozaki-sen) is a subway line, which forms part of the Fukuoka City Subway system in Fukuoka, Japan. It connects Nakasu-Kawabata in Hakata Ward with Kaizuka in Higashi Ward, all within Fukuoka. The line's color on maps is blue. Officially, the line is called Line 2 (Hakozaki Line) (2号線(箱崎線), Ni-gō-sen (Hakozaki-sen)). Like other lines on the subway system, stations are equipped with automatic platform gates, and trains are automatically operated by an ATO system.

== Service outline ==
The line has a through service with the Fukuoka City Subway Airport Line. Half of its trains go through the Airport Line, while the remainder terminate within the Hakozaki Line. Unlike the Airport Line, there is no through service with the JR Chikuhi Line.

== Stations ==
No.	Station name	Japanese	Distance (km)		Transfers	Location
No.	Station name	Japanese	Between stations	Total	Transfers	Location
↑ Through services to/from Meinohama via the Airport Line ↑
H01	Nakasu-Kawabata	中洲川端	-	0.0	Airport Line (through service)	Hakata
H02	Gofukumachi	呉服町	0.5	0.5		Hakata
H03	Chiyo-Kenchōguchi	千代県庁口	0.7	1.2		Hakata
H04	Maidashi-Kyūdai-byōin-mae	馬出九大病院前	0.9	2.1		Higashi
H05	Hakozaki-Miyamae	箱崎宮前	0.8	2.9		Higashi
H06	Hakozaki-Kyūdai-mae	箱崎九大前	0.8	3.7		Higashi
H07	Kaizuka	貝塚	1.0	4.7	Nishitetsu Kaizuka Line	Higashi

== Rolling stock ==
- 1000 series (since 1982)
- 2000 series (since 1992)
- 4000 series (since 2024)
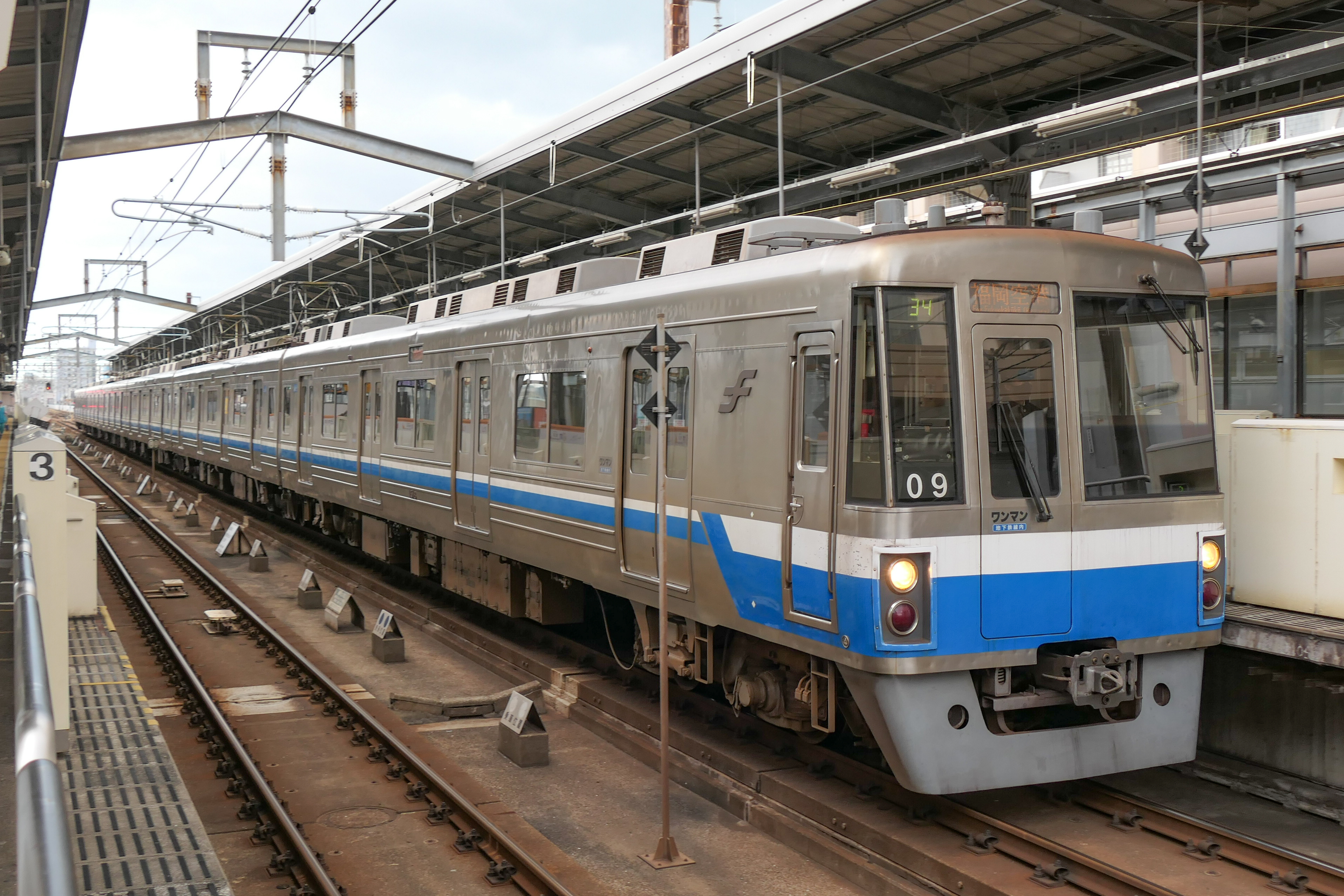
A 1000 series set in December 2021

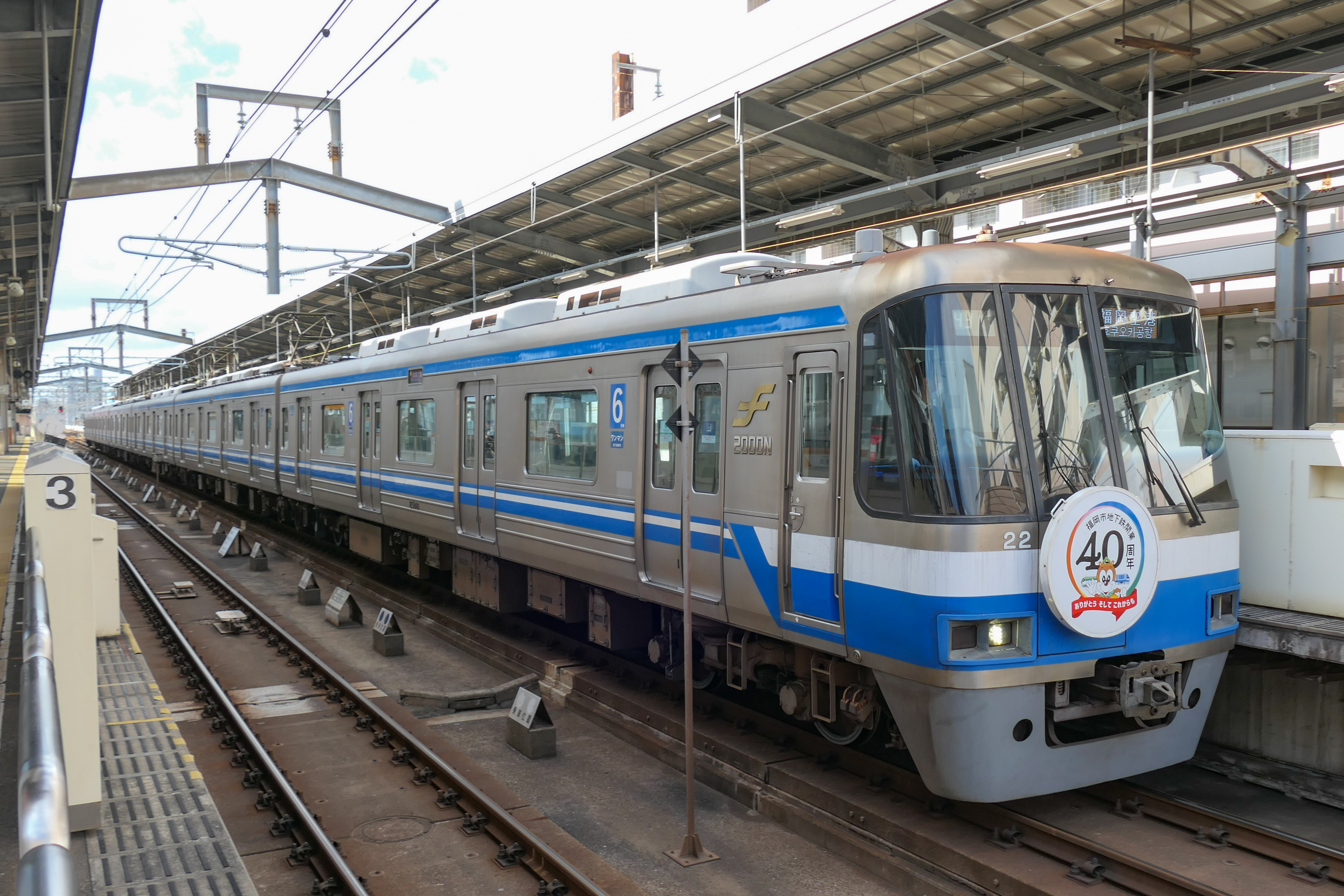
A 2000 series set in December 2021

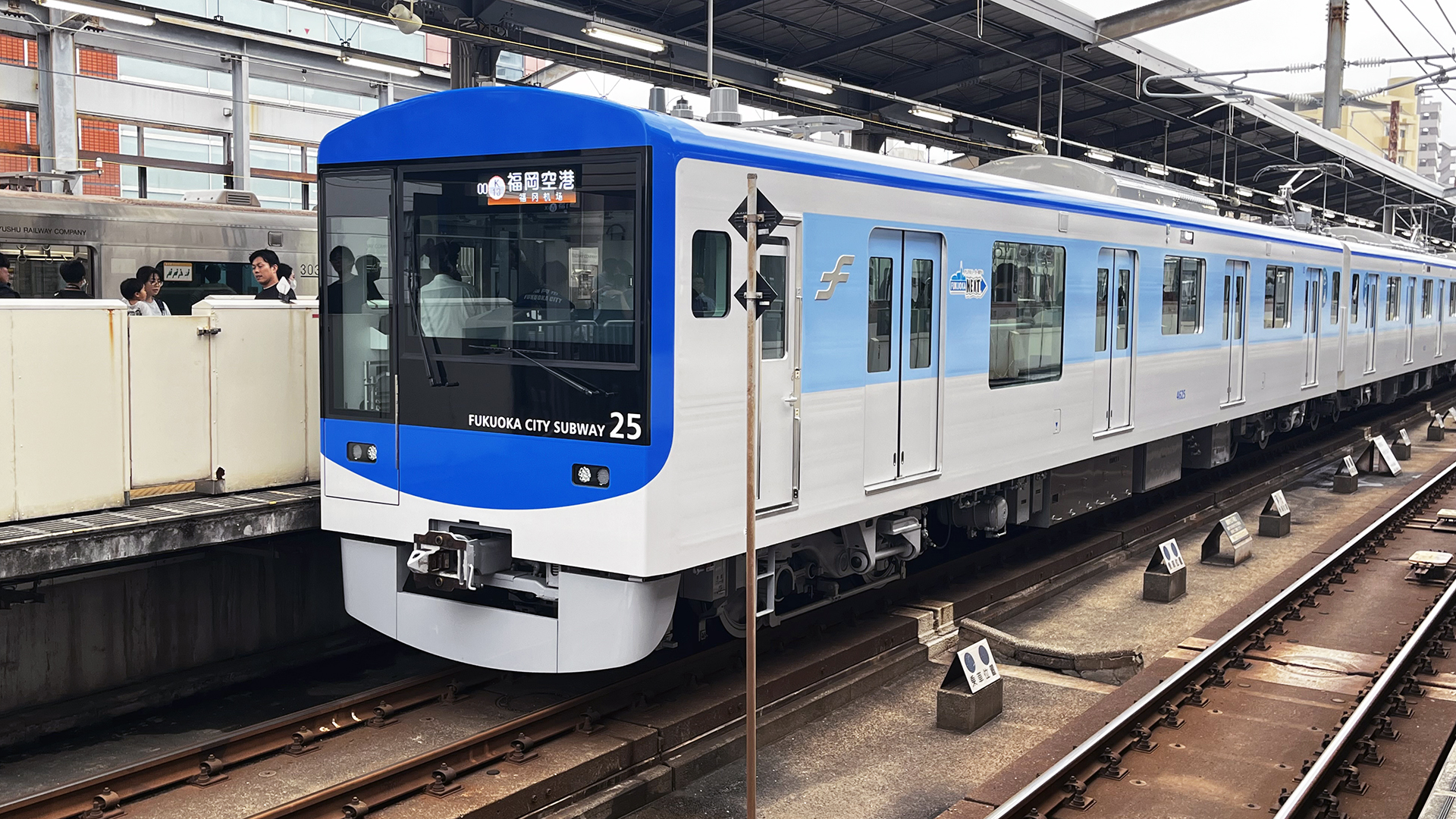
A 4000 series set in October 2024

== History ==
The line opened on 20 April 1982, initially named "Line 2", operating between Nakasu-Kawabata and Gofukumachi. The entire line to Kaizuka was opened on 12 November 1986.

== See also ==
- List of railway lines in Japan
