= Fukuoka Subway 1000 series =

Japanese train type

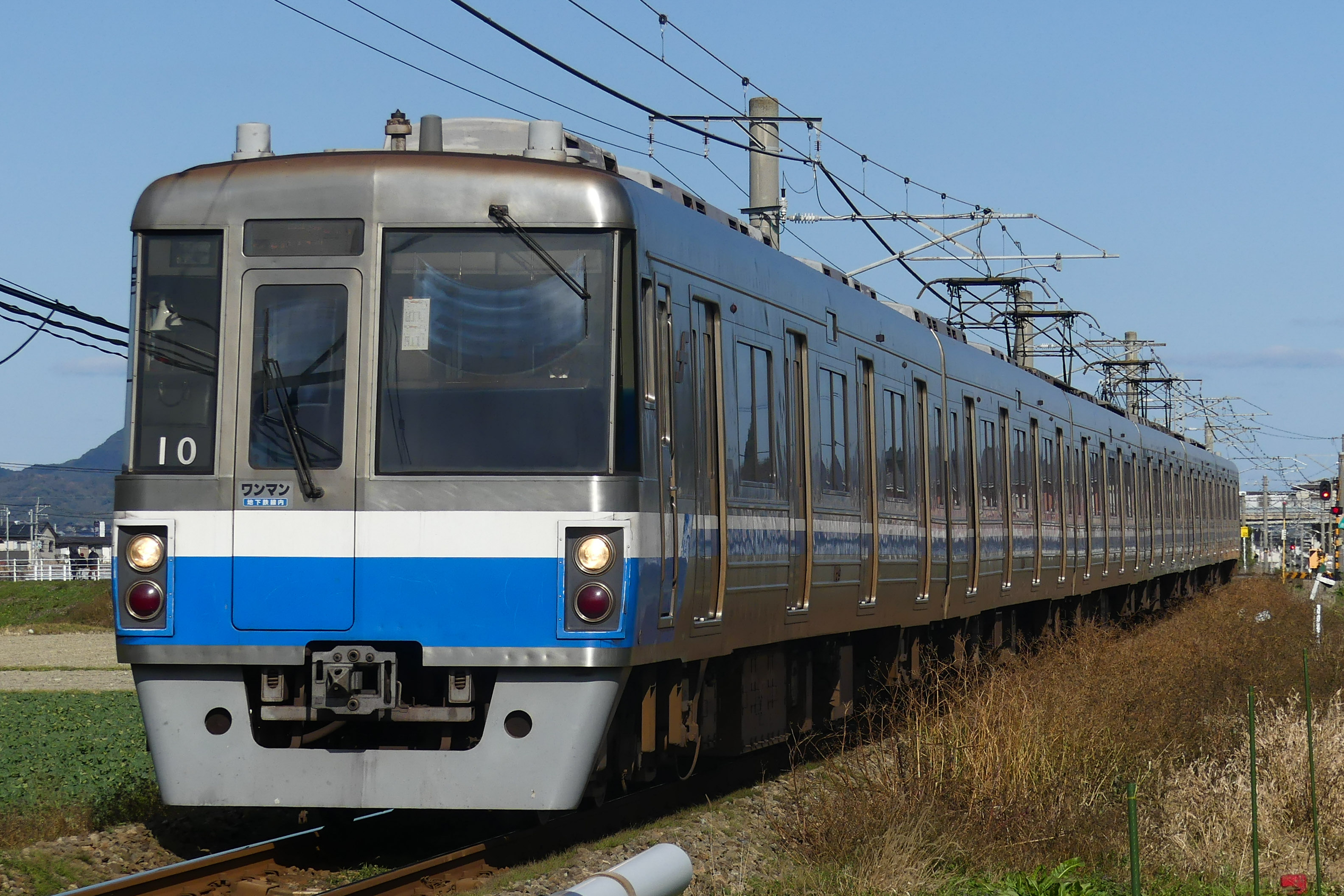
- A 1000 series train operating on the Chikuhi Line in January 2019
- Manufacturers: Kinki Sharyo, Kawasaki Heavy Industries, Nippon Sharyo, Tokyu Car Corporation, Hitachi
- Constructed: 1980–1986
- Entered service: 26 July 1981
- Refurbished: 1997–2004
- Number built: 108 vehicles (18 trainsets)
- Number in service: 108 vehicles (18 trainsets)
- Formation: 6 cars per trainset
- Capacity: 854
- Operator: Fukuoka City Transportation Bureau
- Lines served: Hakozaki Line, Airport Line

Specifications
- Car body construction: Steel/stainless steel
- Car length: 20 m (65 ft 7 in)
- Width: 2.86m
- Doors: 4 pairs per side
- Maximum speed: 90 km/h (56 mph)
- Acceleration: 3.3 km/(h⋅s) (2.1 mph/s)
- Deceleration: 3.5 km/(h⋅s) (2.2 mph/s) (service); 4.0 km/(h⋅s) (2.5 mph/s) (emergency)
- Electric system: 1,500 V DC overhead catenary
- Braking systems: Regenerative brake, Brake-by-wire
- Safety systems: ATC, ATO, ATS
- Track gauge: 1,067 mm (3 ft 6 in)

The Fukuoka Subway 1000 series (福岡市交通局1000系) is an electric multiple unit (EMU) train type operated by the Fukuoka City Transportation Bureau on the Hakozaki Line and Airport Line in Fukuoka, Japan. The trains also inter-run to/from the Chikuhi Line, operated by Kyushu Railway Company (JR Kyushu).

== Design ==
Because the train line runs near the coast, car bodies were constructed of a stainless steel skin on a conventional steel frame for corrosion resistance. The car bodies are unpainted with blue and white stripes representing the Genkai Sea. Each car is 20 m (65 ft 7 in) long with four pairs of doors per side. Early trainsets had opening windows, but these were subsequently replaced with sealed windows. The trains have emergency exit doors at the ends. The doors and window wipers were added after refurbishment.

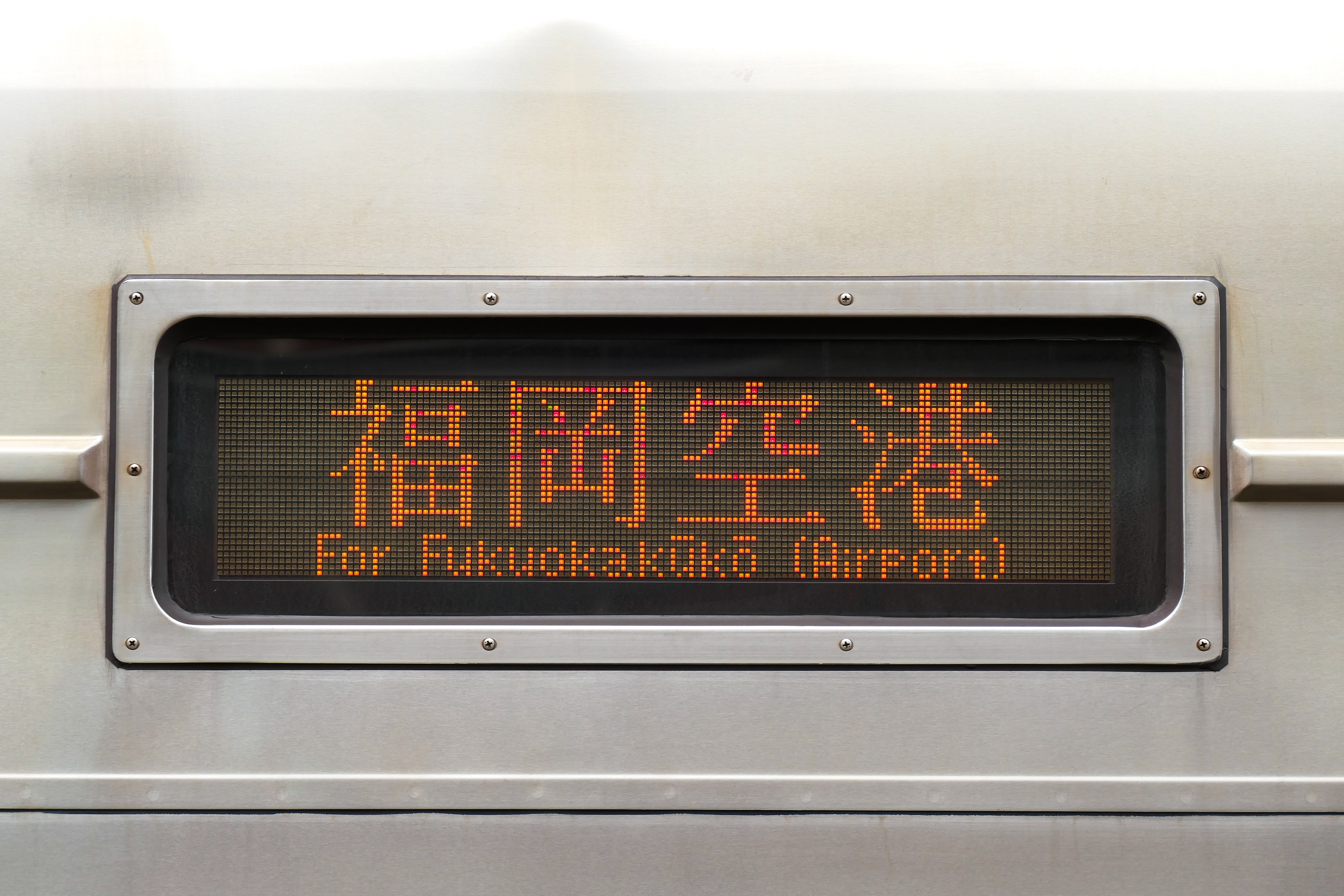
External LED destination display

== Formation ==
As of 1 April 2014, the fleet consists of 18 six-car sets formed as follows, with four motored ("M") cars and two non-powered driving trailer ("Tc") cars.

Car No.	1	2	3	4	5	6
Designation	Tc	M1	M1'	M2	M2'	Tc'
Numbering	15xx	10xx	11xx	10xx	11xx	15xx

Cars 3 and 5 are each fitted with two cross-arm type pantographs.

== Interior ==
The longitudinal seats are covered with a red moquette and some parts of the saloons feature woodgrain panelling. In 1982, wheelchair spaces were added to the cars. All cars are air-conditioned.

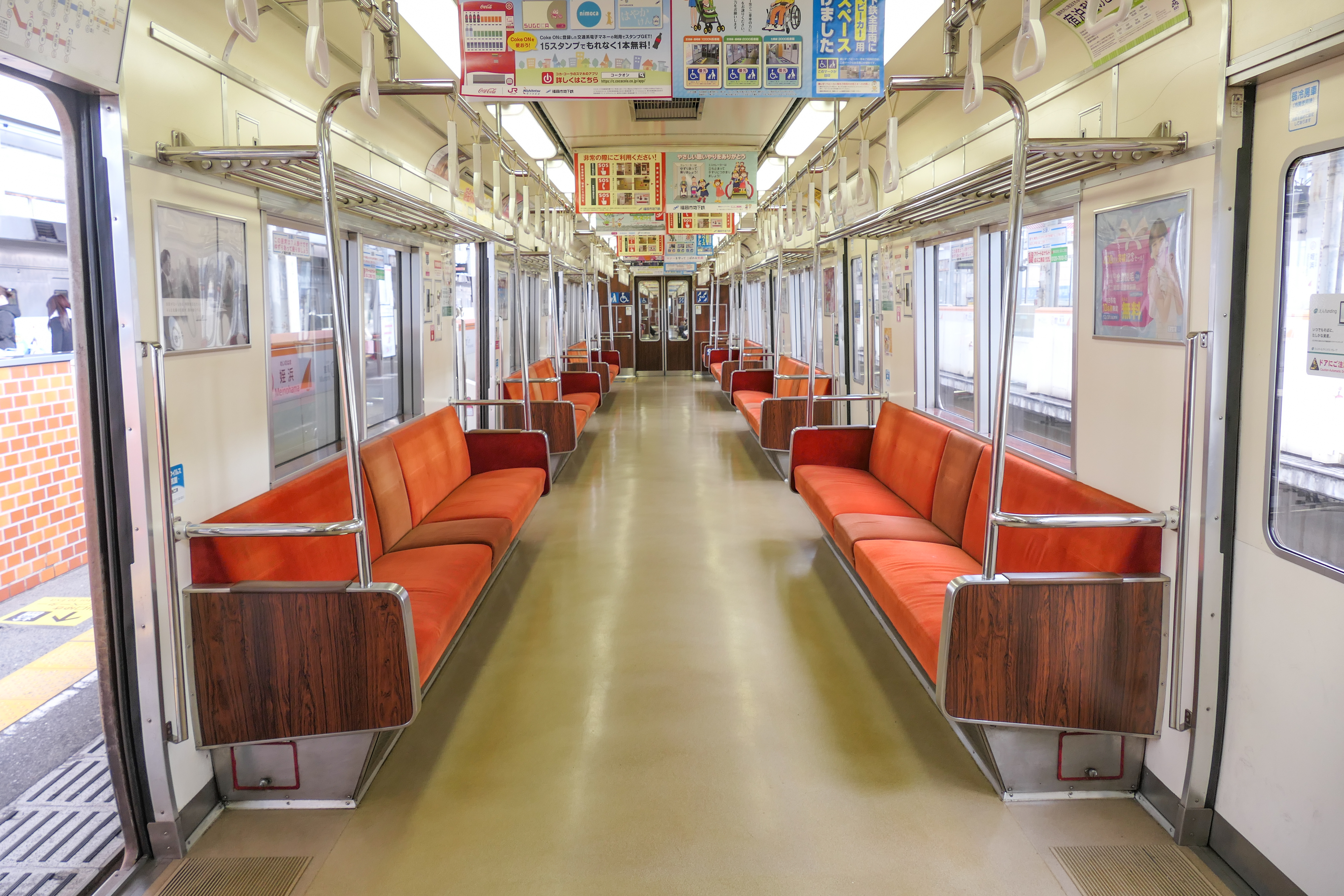
Interior view

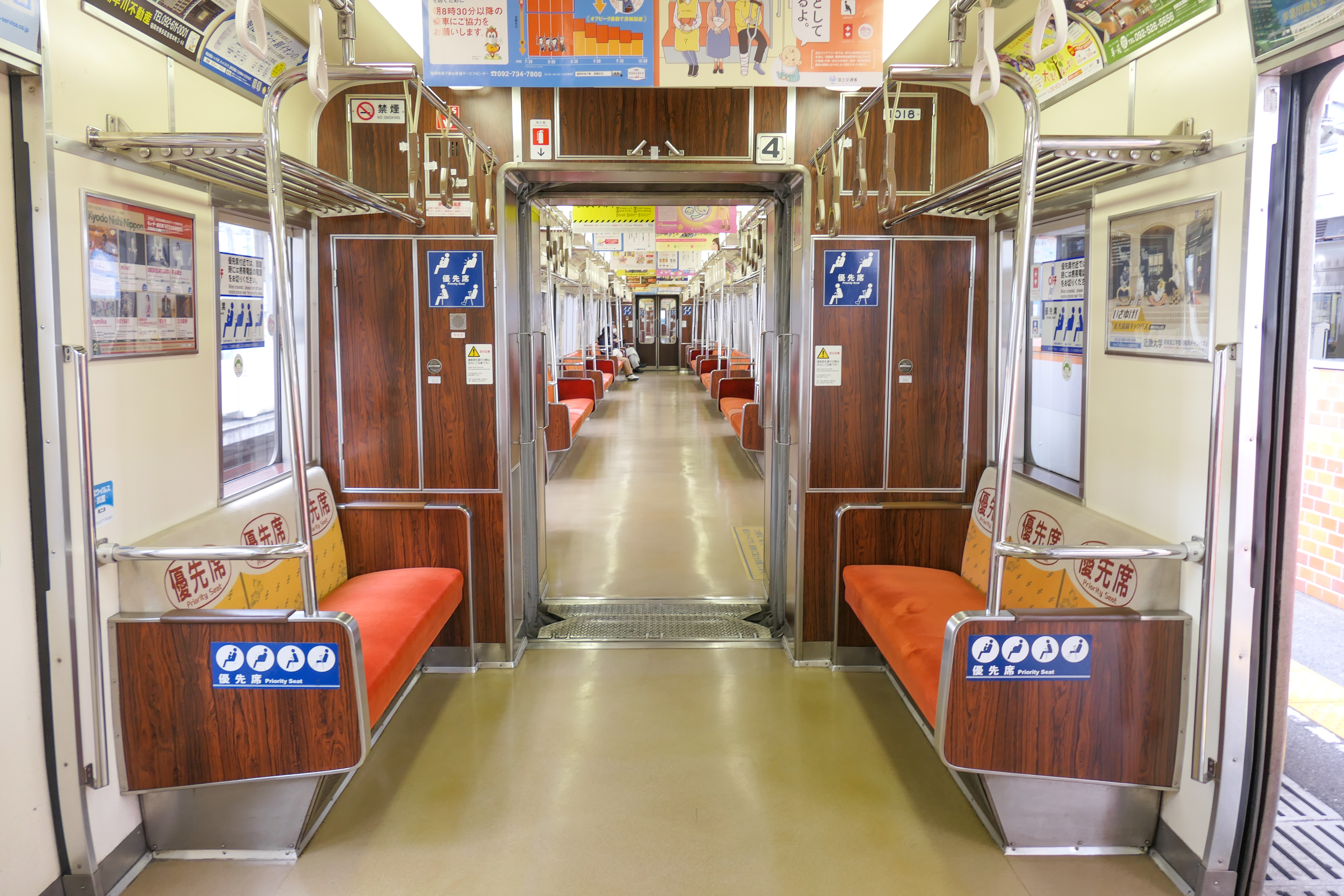
Priority seating

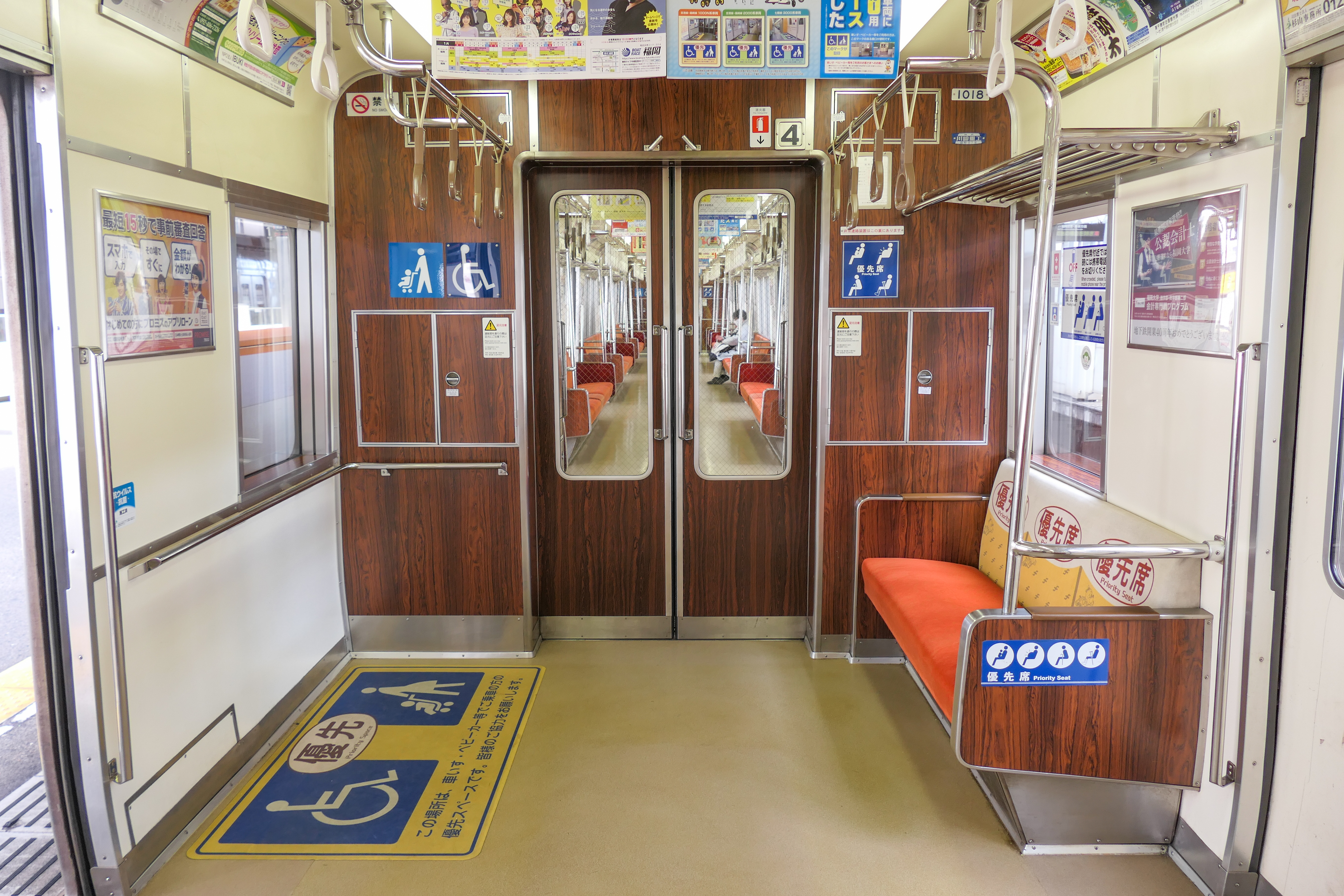
Wheelchair space

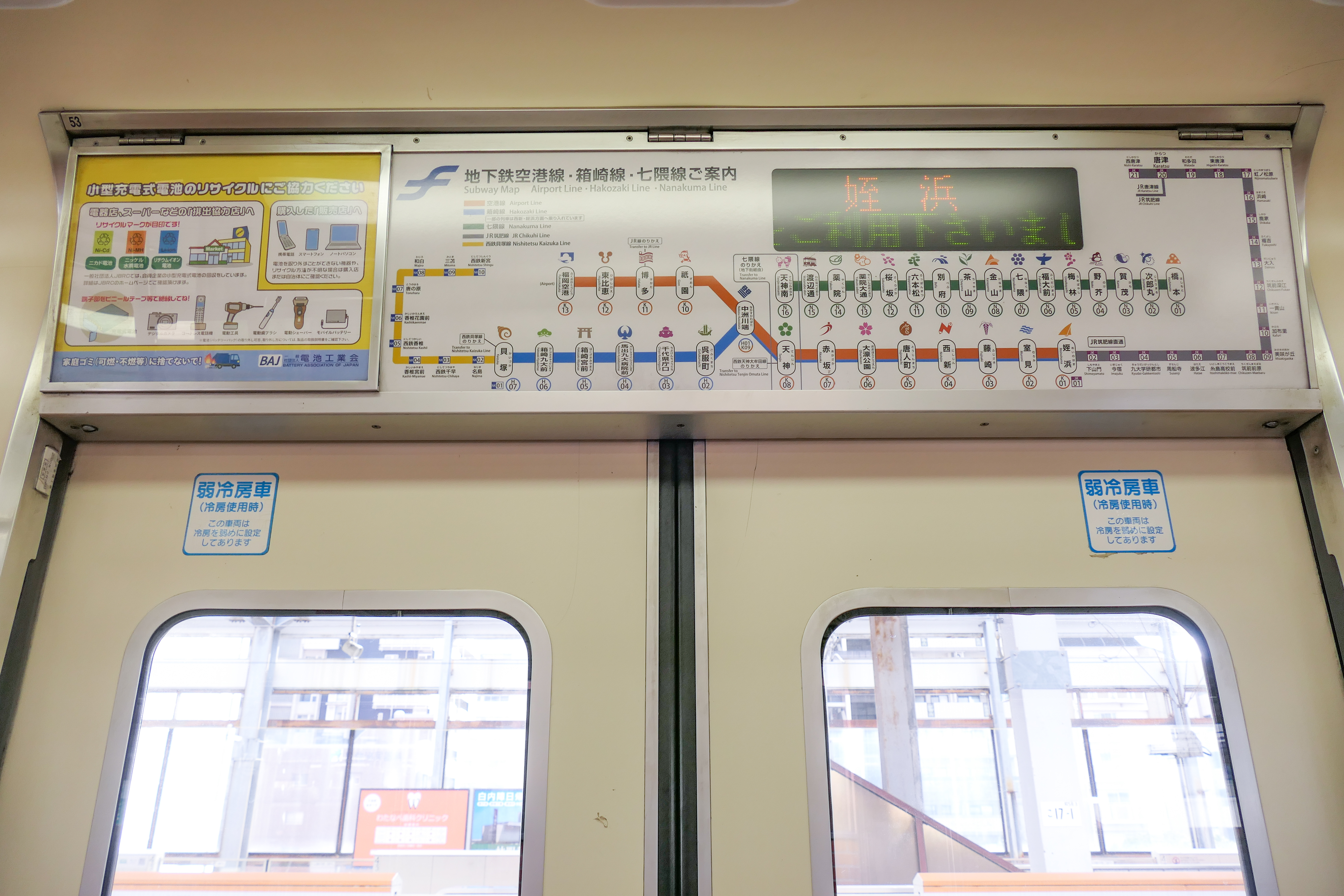
Route map and LED passenger information display

== History ==
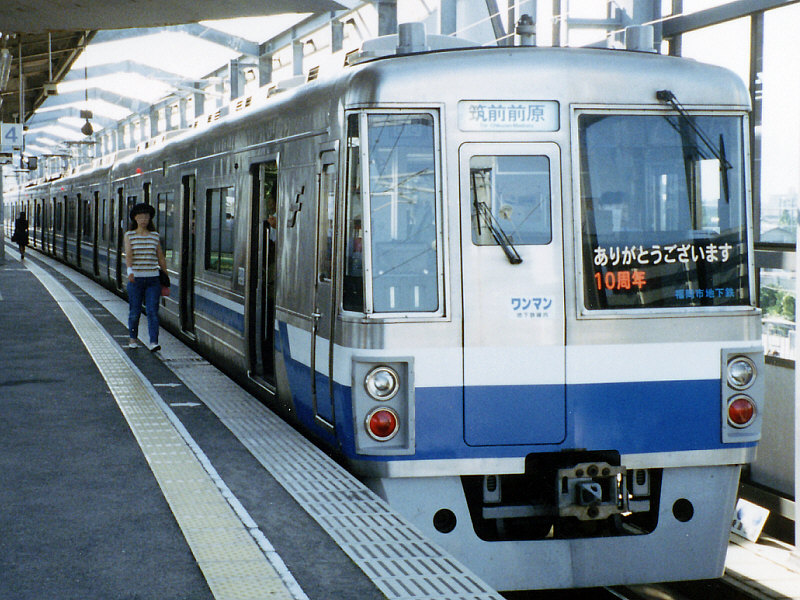
A 1000 series train in August 1991 before refurbishment

The 1000 series entered service on the Fukuoka City Subway coinciding with its opening on 26 July 1981. In 1982, it received the 22nd Laurel Prize.

Driver-only operation commenced on 20 January 1984, using automatic train control (ATC). The cabs are equipped with a master controller, brake handle, and automatic train stop (ATS) system for manual operation.

=== Refurbishment ===
Between 1997 and 2004, 15 years after the first trains were built and after the introduction of the 2000 series, the trains underwent refurbishment. After refurbishment, the trains were called 1000N series. Refurbishment included the following major modifications.

- Variable-frequency drive added
- Cab end window changed (similar to 2000 series)
- Large windows changed
- Rollsign destination indicators replaced with LED indicators
- Interior veneer panelling and floors changed
- Electronic displays showing next station, door chimes and wheelchair spaces
