= Nishijin Station =

Metro station in Fukuoka, Japan

Coordinates: 33.5836°N 130.3588°E

K04 Nishijin Station 西新駅
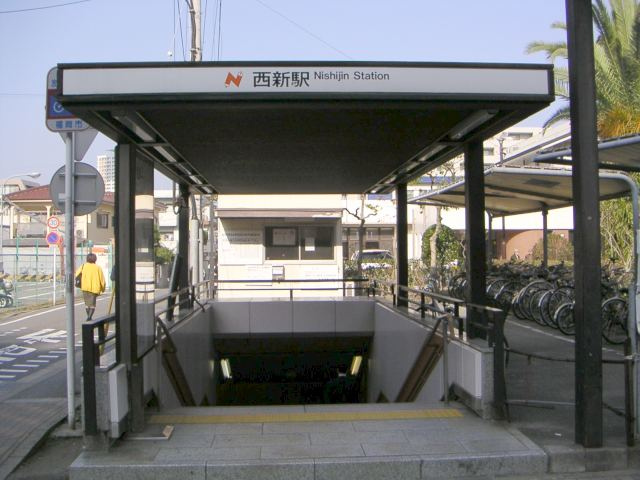
- Entrance No.2 in December 2004

General information
- Location: Sawara, Fukuoka, Fukuoka; Japan
- System: Fukuoka City Subway station
- Operator: Fukuoka City Subway
- Line: Airport Line

Other information
- Station code: K04

History
- Opened: 26 July 1981; 45 years ago

Passengers
- 2006: 20,167 daily

Services
Preceding station	Fukuoka City Subway	Following station
Fujisaki K03 towards Meinohama	Airport Line	Tōjinmachi K05 towards Fukuoka Airport
Location
- Location within Fukuoka city

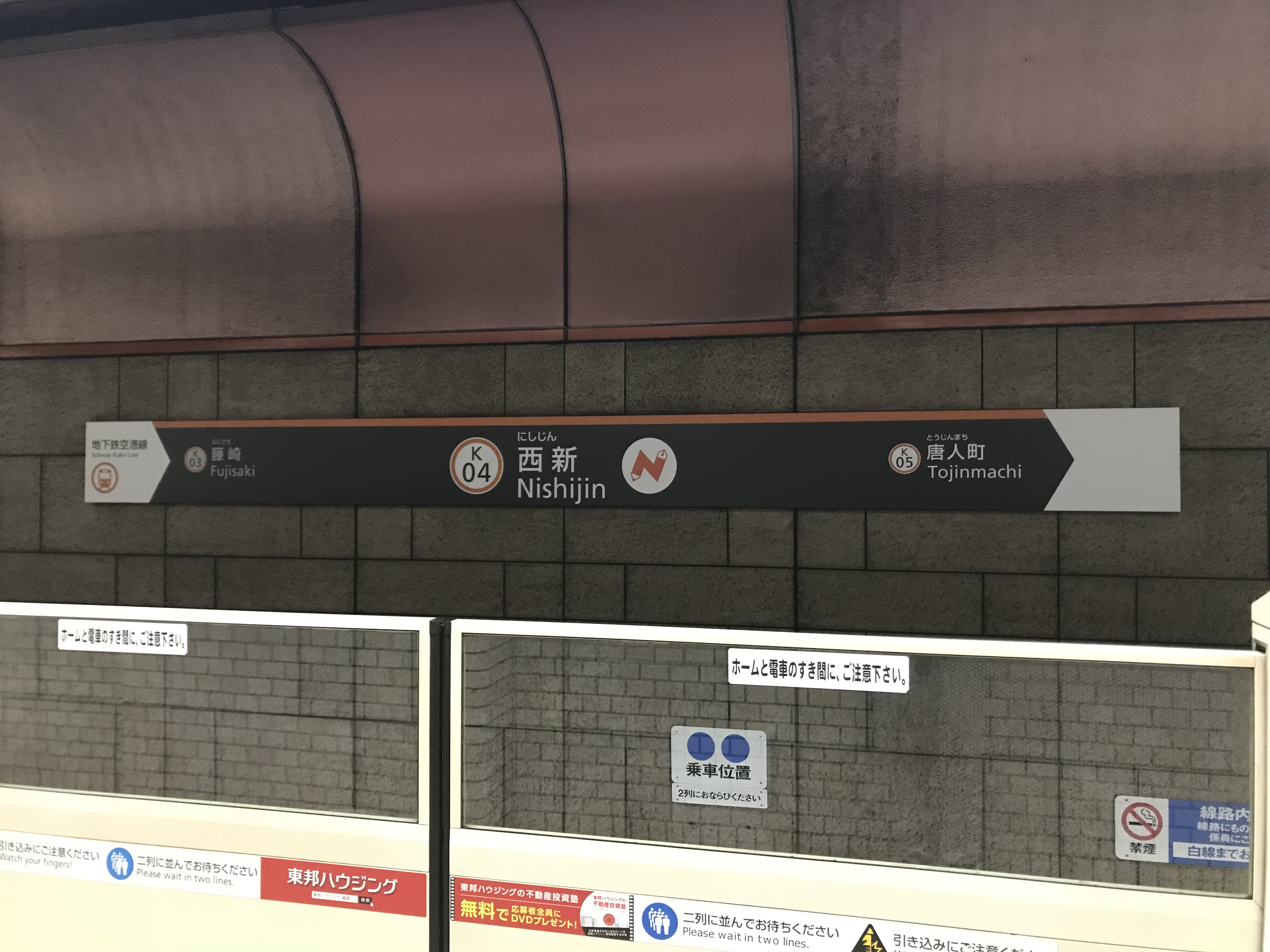
Station sign

Nishijin Station (西新駅, Nishijin-eki) is a train station located in Sawara-ku. The station's symbol is based on a pen, a pencil, and the letter "N" because the Nishijin area has many schools. The station has the station number "K04".

== Lines ==
- Fukuoka City Subway
  - Airport Line

== Platforms ==
1	■ Kūkō Line	for Tenjin, Hakata, Fukuoka Airport and Kaizuka
2	■ Kūkō Line	for Meinohama, Chikuzen-Maebaru and Karatsu

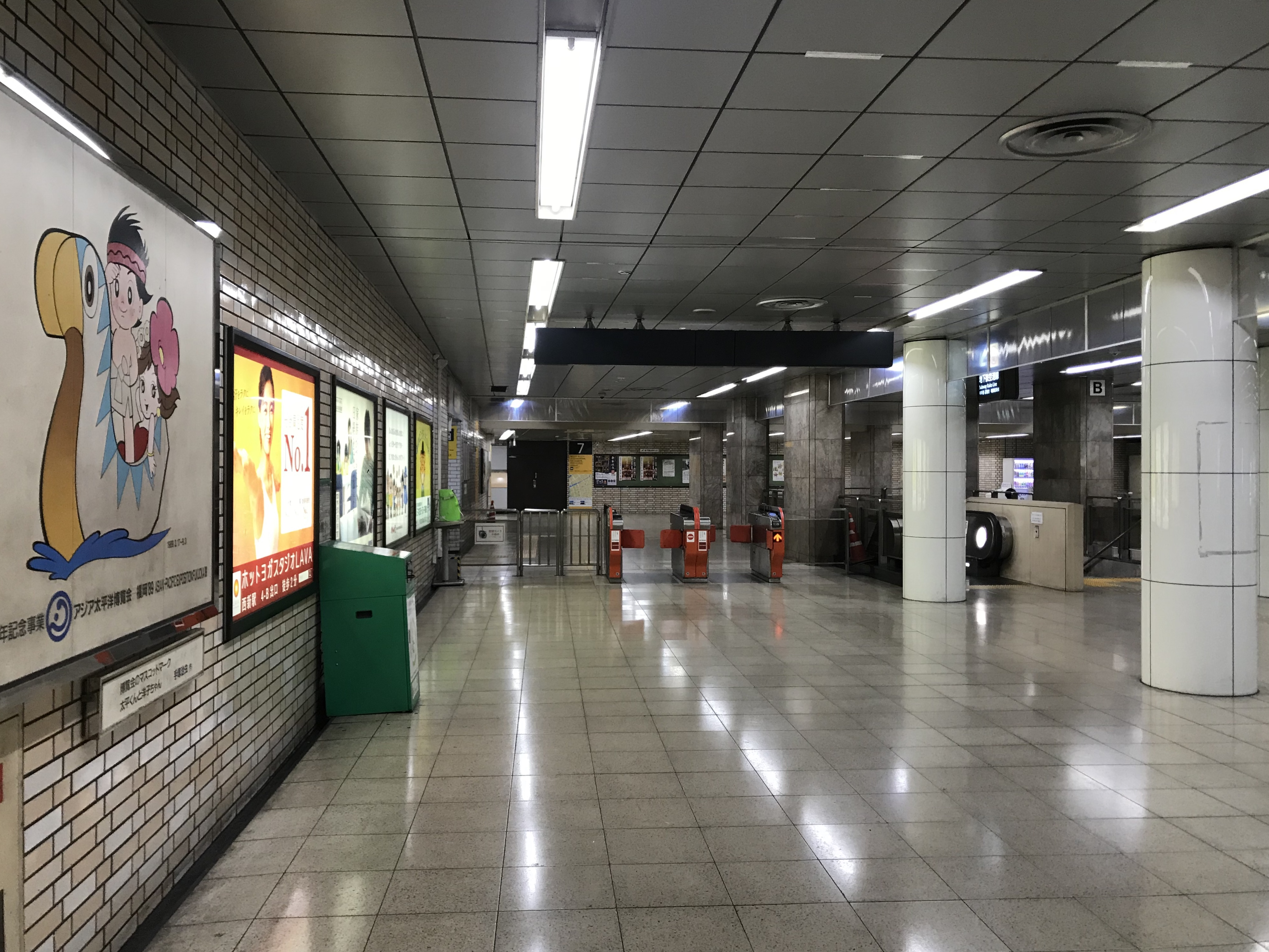
Concourse

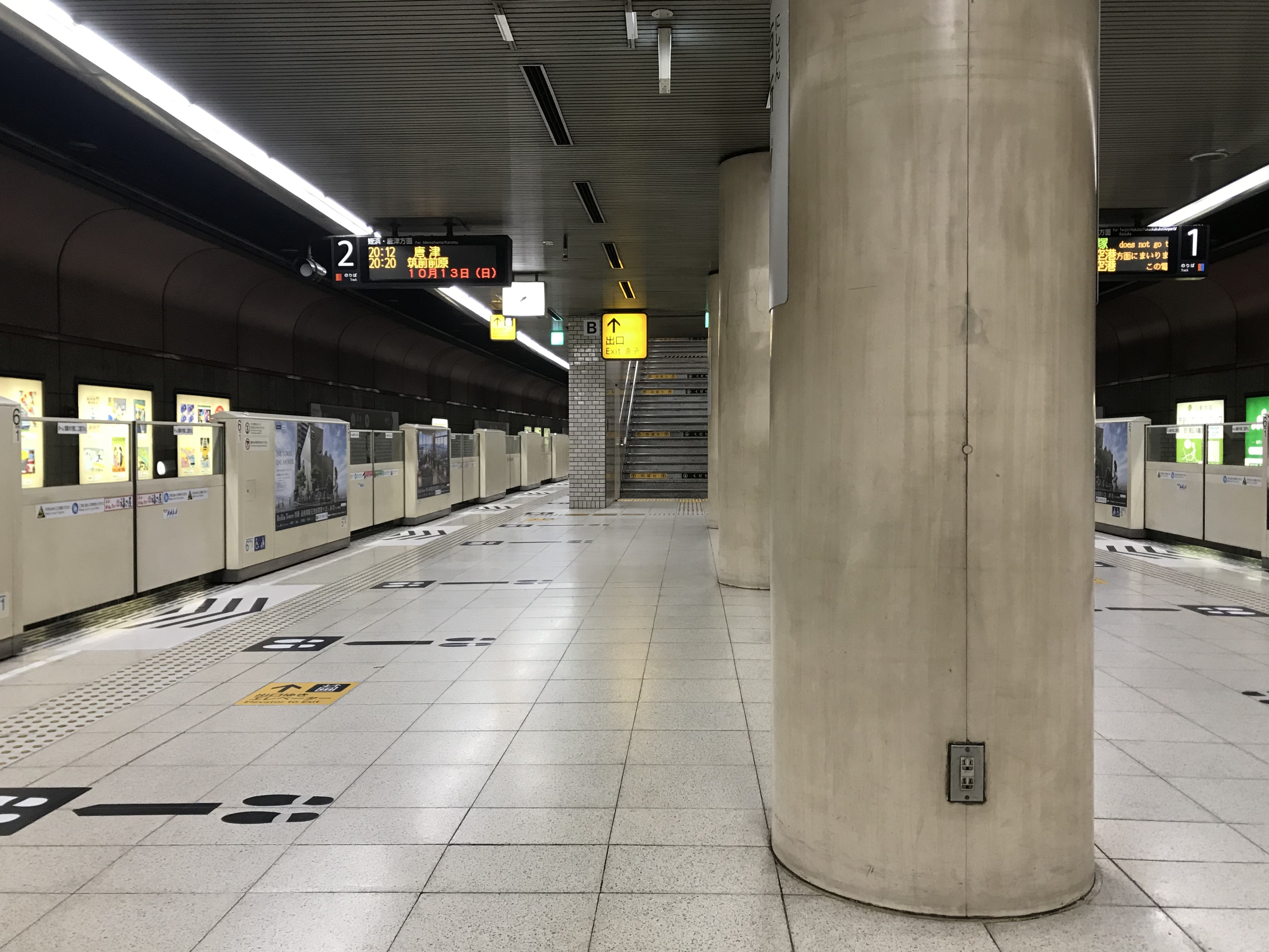
Platform

== Vicinity ==
- Department Stores (Daiei, Best Denki, etc.)
- Freshness Burger
- Fukuoka City Museum
- Fukuoka City Central Library
- Fukuoka Tower
- Nishijin Mall
- Seinan Gakuin University
- High Schools and Elementary Schools
- Shuyukan Senior High School
- Fukuoka Memorial Hospital
- Yoshimura Hospital
