= Timeline of Atlanta =

City history timeline

Coordinates: 33.755°N 84.39°W

The following is a timeline of the history of the city of Atlanta, Georgia, United States.

== 19th century ==
- 1821 – The Treaty of Indian Springs was signed, in which the Creek Indians ceded land that is now Metro Atlanta.
- 1839 – Settlement of "Terminus" established (at what would be end of Western and Atlantic Railroad).
- 1843 – Town of Marthasville incorporated.
- 1845
  - Georgia Railroad (Augusta-Marthasville) begins operating.
  - Marthasville renamed "Atlanta."
- 1846 – Macon & Western RR connects Atlanta with port of Savannah.
- 1847 – Town of Atlanta incorporated.
- 1848 – Moses Formwalt becomes mayor.
- 1849 – Benjamin Bomar becomes mayor.
- 1850
  - Population: 2,572
  - Atlanta Cemetery founded.
- 1851 – Western and Atlantic Railroad connects Atlanta to The Midwest.
- 1852 – Atlanta & West Point Railroad built.
- 1853 – Atlanta becomes seat of Fulton County.
- 1855
  - Atlanta Medical College established.
  - Gas lighting installed in city.
- 1860
  - Population: 9,554.
  - William Ezzard becomes mayor (1860–1861).
- 1861
  - Jared Whitaker becomes mayor (1861–1861, joined CSA government).
  - Thomas Lowe becomes mayor (1861–1862).
- 1864
  - James Calhoun becomes mayor (1862–1866).
  - May–September: Union forces wage Atlanta campaign.
  - September 2: Union forces take city.
  - November 15: Burning of Atlanta by Union forces.
  - Nov. 26: Col. Luther J. Glenn is appointed commander of the Atlanta Post.
  - Dec. 5: Cap. Thomas L. Dodd is appointed the Provost-Marshal.
  - Dec 7: Gen. W. P. Howard sends his report to Governor Brown on the destruction of Atlanta.
- 1865
  - Civil War ends; slaves freed.
  - Atlanta University, first Atlanta black college, founded.
- 1867 – Young Men's Library Association founded.
- 1868
  - Atlanta becomes Georgia state capital.
  - Constitution newspaper begins publication.
- 1869 – Clark College founded.
- 1870 – Population: 21,789.
- 1871
  - Horse-drawn streetcar begins operating.
  - Public school system organized.
- 1877 – Washington Seminary established.
- 1878 – Southern Medical College established.
- 1879
  - Augusta Institute moves from Augusta to Atlanta and is renamed Atlanta Baptist Seminary.
  - Atlanta Building and Loan Association established.
- 1880
  - Abyssinian Library established.
  - Population: 37,409; Atlanta surpasses Savannah as Georgia's largest city.
- 1881
  - Atlanta Baptist Female Seminary and Morris Brown Colored College founded.
  - International Cotton Exposition held.
- 1882 – Atlanta Fire Rescue Department established.
- 1883
  - Atlanta Journal newspaper begins publication.
  - Capital City Club established.
- 1885 – Georgia Institute of Technology founded.
- 1886
  - Ebenezer Baptist Church founded.
  - Atlanta goes "dry".
  - Coca-Cola beverage introduced.
- 1887
  - Piedmont Exposition held.
  - Piedmont Driving Club and Inman Park (first garden suburb) founded.
  - Coca-Cola invents the coupon.
- 1888 – Atlanta Camera Club organized.
- 1889
  - First electric streetcars enable further expansion of city.
  - Georgia State Capitol building opens.
  - Grant Park and Atlanta Zoo established.
  - Fulton Bag and Cotton Mills is incorporated.
- 1890 – Population: 65,533.
- 1891 – Atlanta Consolidated Street Railway in business.
- 1892 – Grady Memorial Hospital opens.
- 1895
  - Cotton States and International Exposition held.
  - September: Booker T. Washington gives "Atlanta Compromise" Speech.
  - Atlanta Woman's Club founded.
- 1896 – Atlanta Conference of the Study of Negro Problems begins.
- 1899 – Federal penitentiary established.
- 1900 – Population: 89,872; metro 419,375.

=== 1900s-1940s ===
- 1901 – Atlanta Theological Seminary established.
- 1902 – Carnegie Library opens.
- 1904 – Atlanta Art Association formed.
- 1905
  - Atlanta School of Medicine and Associated Charities of Atlanta founded.
  - Atlanta Mutual Insurance Association in business.
- 1906 – September 22: Atlanta Race Riot kills 27.
- 1907 – Atlanta Conservatory of Music founded.
- 1908 – Atlanta Neighborhood Union organized.
- 1909 – Architectural Arts League of Atlanta organized.
- 1910
  - Population: 154,839; metro 522,442.
  - Restaurants segregated; other Jim Crow laws follow.
- 1911 – Atlanta Debutante Club founded.
- 1913
  - Georgia Tech starts "evening college", now Georgia State.
  - Augusta Institute established founded in 1867 is renamed Morehouse College.
- 1914
  - Federal Reserve Bank of Atlanta established.
  - 1914–1915 Fulton Bag and Cotton Mills strike.
- 1915
  - Emory College relocated to Atlanta.
  - November: film The Birth of a Nation premieres.
  - Ku Klux Klan refounded in Atlanta.
- 1916
  - Streetcar strike.
  - Utopian Literary Club and Atlanta Junior League founded.
- 1917 – Great Atlanta fire.
- 1918 – 1918 influenza epidemic.
- 1919 – Commission on Interracial Cooperation active.
- 1920
  - Butler Street YMCA opens.
  - Population: 200,616; metro 622,283.
- 1921 – Atlanta Junior Chamber (JCI Atlanta) established.
- 1922 – WSB radio begins broadcasting.
- 1923 – Spring Street Viaduct opens, downtown rises above train tracks.
- 1926 – Atlanta Historical Society founded.
- 1927 – Atlanta Historical Bulletin begins publication.
- 1928 – Atlanta World newspaper begins publication.
- 1929
  - Atlanta University Center Consortium established.
  - City Hall built.
  - January 15: Martin Luther King Jr. is born.
  - WGST radio begins broadcasting.
- 1930 – Population: 270,366; metro 715,391.
- 1931 – WATL radio begins broadcasting.
- 1933 – Georgia Municipal Association headquartered in city.
- 1935 – Cascade Theatre opens.
- 1936
  - Atlanta Dogwood Festival begins.
  - William B. Hartsfield elected mayor.
  - Techwood Homes built, first public housing in US.
- 1937 – WAGA radio begins broadcasting.
- 1939
  - Plaza Theatre opens.
  - Gone with the Wind world premiere draws 300,000 to streets.
- 1940
  - Euclid Theatre opens.
  - Population: 302,288.
- 1941 – Central Atlanta Progress established.
- 1944
  - Atlanta campaign National Historic Site established.
  - Southern Regional Council and Associated Klans of Georgia headquartered in city.
- 1945 – Mary Mac's Tea Room in business.
- 1946
  - U.S. Centers for Disease Control and Prevention founded.
  - December 7: Winecoff Hotel fire.
- 1947 – Regional Metropolitan Planning Commission established.
- 1948 – WSB-TV (television) begins broadcasting.
- 1949
  - WAGA-TV and WERD (AM) radio begin broadcasting.
  - Atlanta Negro Voters League founded.
  - Last streetcar line converted to trolleybus.

=== 1950s-1990s ===
- 1950
  - Population: 331,314; metro 997,666.
  - Transit strike, Atlanta Transit Co. takes over transit from Georgia Railway and Power.
- 1952
  - Georgia Board of Regents, votes to allow women into Georgia Tech.
  - Buckhead annexed.
- 1953 – Links chapter established.
- 1956
  - 1956 Sugar Bowl first black player to play in a college bowl game in deep south causes riots.
  - Alexander Memorial Coliseum opens.
- 1957 – Southern Christian Leadership Conference headquartered in city.
- 1958
  - October 12: Hebrew Benevolent Congregation Temple bombing.
  - Atlanta Masjid of Al-Islam established.
- 1959 – Trolleybuses, buses, public library desegregated.
  - Lenox Square mall opens.
  - Metro population hits 1 million.
- 1960
  - Population: 487,455; metro 1,312,474.
  - March 15: An Appeal for Human Rights is released.
  - Sit-ins at Rich's lunch counters during the Civil Rights Movement.
  - Atlanta Inquirer newspaper begins publication.
- 1961
  - Ivan Allen Jr. becomes mayor.
  - Public schools begin token desegregation.
  - Rich's desegregates restaurant.
  - John Portman opens Merchandise Mart, kicking off transformation of downtown.
  - One Park Tower built.
- 1962
  - Peyton Road barricades built in Cascade Heights.
  - 106 Atlanta art patrons die in Paris air crash.
- 1963
  - Atlanta Marathon begins.
  - Trolleybuses converted en masse to buses.
- 1964
  - U.S. Supreme Court decides Heart of Atlanta Motel, Inc. v. United States.
  - Atlanta Press Club and Atlanta Track Club established.
- 1965 – Atlanta–Fulton County Stadium constructed.
- 1966
  - State of Georgia Building constructed.
  - Both the relocated Atlanta Braves of Major League Baseball and the expansion Atlanta Falcons of the National Football League begin play at Atlanta–Fulton County Stadium.
- 1967
  - Atlanta Chiefs soccer team begins play.
  - Sister city relationship established with Salzburg, Austria.
- 1968
  - King Center for Nonviolent Social Change founded.
  - Peach Bowl annual football game begins.
  - Atlanta Hawks basketball team relocates to Atlanta.
  - Equitable Building constructed.
- 1969
  - Coronet Theater and Perimeter freeway open.
  - Afro-American Police League chapter established.
- 1970
  - Peachtree Road Race begins.
  - Population: 496,973; metro 1,763,626
- 1971
  - Atlanta Gay Pride Festival established.
  - International flights begin at Hartsfield Airport.
- 1972
  - Sister city relationships established with Montego Bay, Jamaica; and Rio de Janeiro, Brazil.
  - The Atlanta Flames are established as an expansion team of the National Hockey League.
  - The Omni Coliseum opens as the new home of the NBA's Hawks and NHL's Flames.
- 1973
  - Maynard Jackson becomes first black mayor of Atlanta.
  - GSU Sports Arena open.
- 1974
  - Sevananda Natural Foods Market in business.
  - Sister city relationships established with Lagos, Nigeria; Taipei, Taiwan; and Toulouse, France.
  - Feminist Bookstore Charis Books & More opens in Little 5 Points.
- 1975 – Centennial Tower built.
- 1976
  - Atlanta Botanical Garden established.
  - Atlanta Film Festival begins.
  - Georgia World Congress Center opens.
- 1977
  - Atlanta Soto Zen Center founded.
  - Sister city relationship established with Newcastle upon Tyne, United Kingdom.
- 1979
  - Metropolitan Atlanta Rapid Transit Authority begins operating.
  - Atlanta murders of 1979–1981 begin.
- 1980
  - Population: 425,022; metro 2,233,324.
  - All-news television network CNN begins broadcasting; Turner empire takes off.
  - Al-Farooq Masjid (mosque) and Martin Luther King Jr., National Historic Site established.
  - Flames hockey team sold and relocated to Calgary, Alberta.
- 1981
  - Atlanta Gay Men's Chorus founded.
  - Sister city relationship established with Daegu, South Korea.
- 1982
  - Andrew Young becomes mayor.
  - Carter Center headquartered in Atlanta.
- 1983
  - Atlanta–Fulton Public Library System established.
  - Sister city relationship established with Brussels, Belgium.
- 1984 – Sweet Auburn Heritage Festival begins.
- 1986
  - Jimmy Carter Library and Museum dedicated.
  - Midtown Assistance Center established.
- 1987
  - John Lewis becomes U.S. representative for Georgia's 5th congressional district.
  - Sister city relationship established with Port of Spain, Trinidad and Tobago.
- 1988
  - Democratic Convention.
  - Sister city relationship established with Tbilisi, Georgia.
- 1990 – Population: 394,017; metro 2,959,950.
- 1991
  - Atlanta Bicycle Coalition organized.
  - Land bank established.
  - Drepung Loseling Institute opens.
- 1992
  - 6 September: Georgia Dome opens.
  - SunTrust Plaza and Bank of America Plaza built.
- 1994 – Sister city relationships established with Bucharest, Romania; and Ancient Olympia, Greece.
- 1995
  - October 28: Atlanta Braves baseball team wins 1995 World Series.
  - Atlanta Downtown Improvement District established.
  - Sister city relationship established with Cotonou, Benin.
- 1996
  - Centennial Olympic Park opens.
  - 18 May: Centennial Olympic Stadium opens.
  - 19 July–4 August: 1996 Summer Olympics held.
  - July 27: Centennial Olympic Park bombing.
  - 16–25 August: 1996 Summer Paralympics held.
  - 24 October: Atlanta–Fulton County Stadium closed.
  - Sister city relationship established with Salcedo, Dominican Republic.
- 1997
  - Centennial Olympic Stadium reconstructed as Turner Field.
  - 2 August: Atlanta–Fulton County Stadium demolished and parking space built for Turner Field.
- 1998
  - City website online (approximate date).
  - Sister city relationship established with Nuremberg, Germany.
- 1999
  - Philips Arena opens.
  - Atlanta Thrashers ice hockey team begins play.
- 2000
  - Freedom Park dedicated.
  - Sister city relationship established with Ra'anana, Israel.
  - Population: 416,474; metro 4,112,198.

== 21st century ==
=== 2000s ===
- 2001 - The Atlanta Journal-Constitution newspaper in publication. Morning Atlanta Constitution and afternoon Atlanta Journal merge weekday publication in aftermath of 9/11 economic fallout.
- 2002 - Shirley Franklin becomes mayor.
- 2003 - Fermi Project established.
- 2004 - Atlanta Rollergirls established.
- 2005
  - Airport becomes world's busiest.
  - Sister city relationship established with Fukuoka, Japan.
- 2008
  - Delta becomes world's largest airline.
  - March 14–15: 2008 Atlanta tornado outbreak.

=== 2010s ===
- 2010 - Population: 420,003; metro 5,268,860.
- 2011
  - Thrashers hockey team are sold and relocated to Winnipeg, Manitoba, becoming the new Winnipeg Jets.
  - Atlanta Public Schools cheating scandal investigative report issued.
  - Atlanta first US city to demolish all public housing projects.
- 2012 - Part of BeltLine path opens.
- 2014 - National Center for Civil and Human Rights opens.
- 2015 - Population: 463,875 (estimate).
- 2016
  - Murder Kroger closes.
  - Turner Field hosts its last baseball game, with the Braves moving to a new ballpark, SunTrust Park, in Cobb County.
- 2017
  - Georgia Dome closes.
  - Atlanta United FC begins play in Major League Soccer.
  - Interstate 85 bridge collapse occurs.
  - Turner Field reconstructed as Georgia State Stadium.
  - Mercedes-Benz Stadium opens.
- 2018 - Hackers successfully breach the city's servers, encrypting files with ransomware and disrupting services.

=== 2020s ===
- 2021
  - The Atlanta spa shootings occur.
  - The Atlanta Braves baseball team win the 2021 World Series.

== See also ==
- History of Atlanta
- List of mayors of Atlanta
- Timeline of mass transit in Atlanta
- Timelines of other cities in Georgia: Athens, Augusta, Columbus, Macon, Savannah
- Sister city timelines: Brussels, Bucharest, Cotonou, Fukuoka, Lagos, Nuremberg, Rio de Janeiro, Salzburg, Tbilisi, Toulouse

== Bibliography ==
=== Published in 19th century ===
1860s-1870s

- V. T. Barnwell (1867), Barnwell's Atlanta city directory, and strangers' guide, Atlanta: Intelligencer Book and Job Office, OL 22850965M
- Atlanta City Directory for 1870. Atlanta, Georgia: William R. Hanleiter. 1870.
- William Henry Overall, ed. (1870), "Atlanta", Dictionary of Chronology, London: William Tegg, OCLC 2613202
- Atlanta City Directory for 1872. Atlanta, Georgia: Plantation Publishing Co. 1872.
- Charles H. Jones (1873), "Atlanta", Appletons' Hand-book of American Travel: the Southern Tour, New York: D. Appleton & Co.
- Directory of the City of Atlanta for 1877. A.E. Sholes. 1877.
- E.Y. Clarke (1877), Illustrated History of Atlanta, J. P. Harrison
- "Atlanta" . Encyclopædia Britannica. Vol. 3 (9th ed.). 1878. p. 15.

1880s-1890s

- Atlanta City Directory. Sholes & Co. 1882.
- Jacob D. Cox (1882), Atlanta, New York: C. Scribner's Sons, OL 7223076M
- I.W. Avery (1885). Atlanta: the leader in trade, population, wealth and manufactures in Georgia. Atlanta: Constitution Publishing Co.
- Wallace Putnam Reed (1889), History of Atlanta, Georgia, Syracuse, N.Y: D. Mason & Co., OL 22882278M
- Atlanta City Directory. Atlanta, Ga.: R.L. Polk & Co. 1891.
- E.R. Carter (1894), The black side: a partial history of the business, religious and educational side of the Negro in Atlanta, Ga., Atlanta
- Atlanta City Directory for 1896. Franklin Printing and Publishing Co. 1896.
- Atlanta City Directory for 1898. Bullock and Saunders. 1898.
- Handbook of the City of Atlanta, Atlanta: Atlanta City Council, 1898
- "City of Atlanta", Rand, McNally & Co.'s Handy Guide to the Southeastern States, Chicago: Rand, McNally & Co., 1899

=== Published in 20th century ===
1900s-1940s

- "Atlanta", Chambers's Encyclopaedia, London: W. & R. Chambers, 1901
- Edward Young Clarke, ed. (1902), Atlanta: greatest city of the great South, OL 22850070M
- Thomas H. Martin (1902), Atlanta and its builders, Atlanta: Century Memorial Publishing Co.; v.2
- Pioneer citizens' history of Atlanta, 1833-1902, Atlanta, Ga.: Pioneer Citizens' Society, 1902, OCLC 1850685, OL 6609963M
- Atlanta, Carnegie Library of (March 1903), "Finding List Georgia Collection: Atlanta", Carnegie Library Bulletin, vol. 1, no. 8, Atlanta, Ga.
- Atlanta City Directory. Foote & Davies Co. 1914. 1904
  - 1908 ed.
- Atlanta, a twentieth-century city, Atlanta: Atlanta Chamber of Commerce, 1904, OL 22850074M
- J.D. Cleaton (1907), Atlanta: Metropolis of the South, Atlanta: Franklin-Turner, OL 24343221M
- "Atlanta", United States (4th ed.), Leipzig: K. Baedeker, 1909, OCLC 02338437
- "Atlanta" . Encyclopædia Britannica. Vol. 2 (11th ed.). 1910. pp. 853–854.
- "Atlanta, Georgia". The Modern City. 3. League of American Municipalities. December 1918. hdl:2027/mdp.39015020070325.
- Atlanta City Directory. Atlanta City Directory Co. 1919.
- Atlanta City Directory. Atlanta City Directory Company. 1922.
- John R. Hornady (1922), Atlanta: Yesterday, Today and Tomorrow, American Cities Book Company, OL 23279317M
- Federal Writers' Project (1942), "Chronology", Atlanta, American Guide Series, New York: Smith & Durrell, p. 241+

1950s-1990s

- "Atlanta, Pacesetter City of the South", National Geographic Magazine, vol. 135, Washington DC, 1969
- Virginia H. Hein (1972). "The Image of 'A City Too Busy to Hate': Atlanta in the 1960s". Phylon. 33 (3): 205–221. doi:10.2307/273521. JSTOR 273521.
- James C. Starbuck (1974), Historic Atlanta to 1930: an indexed, chronological bibliography, Monticello, Ill., OCLC 933763, OL 24980299M
- Blaine A. Brownell (1975). "Commercial-Civic Elite and City Planning in Atlanta, Memphis, and New Orleans in the 1920s". Journal of Southern History. 41 (3): 339–368. doi:10.2307/2206403. JSTOR 2206403.
- George J. Lankevich (1977), Howard B. Furer (ed.), Atlanta: a chronological & documentary history, 1813-1976, American Cities Chronology Series, Dobbs Ferry, N.Y.: Oceana Publications, ISBN 0379006189
- Ory Mazar Nergal, ed. (1980), "Atlanta, GA", Encyclopedia of American Cities, New York: E.P. Dutton, OL 4120668M
- Clarence N. Stone (1989). Regime Politics: Governing Atlanta, 1946-1988. Studies in Government and Public Policy. University Press of Kansas. ISBN 0700604154.
- George Thomas Kurian (1994), "Atlanta, Georgia", World Encyclopedia of Cities, Vol. 1: North America, Santa Barbara, Calif.: ABC-CLIO, OL 1431653M (fulltext via Open Library)
- Rebecca J. Dameron; Arthur D. Murphy (1997). "An International City Too Busy To Hate? Social And Cultural Change In Atlanta: 1970-1995". Urban Anthropology and Studies of Cultural Systems and World Economic Development. 26 (1): 43–69. JSTOR 40553316.
- "Georgia: Atlanta", USA, Australia: Lonely Planet, 1999, p. 541+, ISBN 9780864425133, OL 19682441M
- Robert D. Bullard et al., eds (2000). Sprawl City: Race, Politics, and Planning in Atlanta. Washington, DC: Island Press.
- Carole E. Scott; Richard D. Guynn (2000). "The Atlanta Streetcar Strikes". Georgia Historical Quarterly. 84 (3): 434–459. JSTOR 40584340.

=== Published in 21st century ===
- Larry Keating (2001). Atlanta: Race, Class And Urban Expansion. Temple University Press. ISBN 978-1-4399-0449-7.
- Paul S. Boyer, ed. (2001). "Atlanta". Oxford Companion to United States History. Oxford University Press. ISBN 978-0-19-508209-8.
- Richard Pillsbury, ed. (2006). "Atlanta". Geography. New Encyclopedia of Southern Culture. Vol. 2. Chapel Hill: University of North Carolina Press. p. 153. OCLC 910189354.
- David Goldfield, ed. (2007). "Atlanta, Georgia". Encyclopedia of American Urban History. Sage. pp. 50–52. ISBN 978-1-4522-6553-7.
- Steve Goodson (2007). Highbrows, Hillbillies, and Hellfire: Public Entertainment in Atlanta, 1880-1930. University of Georgia Press. ISBN 978-0-8203-2930-7.
- David L. Sjoquist, ed. (2009). Past Trends and Future Prospects of the American City: The Dynamics of Atlanta. Rowman & Littlefield. ISBN 978-0-7391-3537-2. (About economic aspects of city)
