= Timeline of Fukuoka =

The following is a timeline of the history of Fukuoka City, Japan.

== Prior to 20th century ==
- 1601 - Fukuoka Castle construction begins.
- 1868 - The temple of Yeiyas was destroyed by fire.
- 1877 - Tsukushi Shimbun (newspaper) begins publication.
- 1880 - Fukuoka Nichinichi Shimbun (newspaper) in publication.
- 1881 - Genyōsha political group founded.
- 1885 - Fukuoka Prefectural Shuyukan (school) active.
- 1887 - Population: 50,442.
- 1889 - Hakata becomes part of Fukuoka city.
- 1899 - Foreign commerce begins.

== 20th century ==
- 1901 - Population: about 72,000.
- 1909 - Population: 82,106.
- 1910 - Kyushu Imperial University established.
- 1917 - Fukuoka Prefectural Fukuoka High School established.
- 1928 - Heiwadai Stadium opens.
- 1929 - Ōhori Park opens.
- 1940 - Population: 306,763.
- 1941 - Mitsubishi Trust branch opens.
- 1942 - Kanmon Tunnel opened; first direct railway link between Honshu and Kyushu
- 1943 - Military Mushiroda Airfield built.
- 1945
  - City firebombed on 19 June during World War II.
  - US military occupation of Itazuke Air Base begins.
  - Population: 252,282.
- 1947
  - Fukuoka Marathon begins.
  - Population: 328,548.
- 1949 - Fukuoka Stock Exchange established.
- 1950 - Population: 392,649.
- 1953 - Fukuoka Municipal Zoo and Botanical Garden founded.
- 1956 - Fukuoka Daiichi High School established.
- 1957 - Grand Sumo tournament begins.
- 1960 - Population: 749,800.
- 1963 - Fukuoka Institute of Technology active.
- 1972
  - Fukuoka designated a government ordinance city.
  - US military occupation of Itazuke Air Base ends.
  - Hirokawa Bosai Dam is completed
- 1975
  - March: Sanyō Shinkansen (hi-speed train) begins operating.
  - Population: 1,000,000.
- 1979 - Fukuoka Art Museum established.
- 1981
  - Subway Airport Line begins operating.
  - Fukuoka Kokusai Center opens.
- 1982
  - Subway Hakozaki Line begins operating.
  - Fukuoka City Archaeology Center established.
- 1983 - Subway Gion Station opens.
- 1989
  - Fukuoka Tower built.
  - Fukuoka Hawks baseball team active.
- 1990
  - Fukuoka City Museum established.
  - Population: 1,221,600.
- 1993 - Fukuoka Dome (stadium) opens.
- 1995 - Hakatanomori Football Stadium opens.
- 1996 - Canal City Hakata (shopping mall) in business.
- 1999
  - Fukuoka Asian Art Museum opens.
  - Fukuoka Asian Art Triennale exhibit begins.
- 2000 - Population: 1,341,489.

== 21st century ==
- 2001 - Sky Dream Fukuoka (ferris wheel) erected.
- 2003 - Fukuoka International Congress Center opens.
- 2005
  - February: Subway Nanakuma Line begins operating.
  - March 20: 2005 Fukuoka earthquake occurs.
- 2010
  - Soichiro Takashima elected mayor.
  - Population: 1,463,743.
- 2011 - Hakata Station rebuilt.

== See also ==
- Fukuoka history
- Timeline of Fukuoka (in Japanese)
- List of mayors of Fukuoka

== Bibliography ==
- "Fukuoka" . Encyclopædia Britannica. Vol. 11 (11th ed.). 1910. p. 291.
- Richard Tames (2008). "Historical Gazetteer: Fukuoka". A Traveller's History of Japan (4th ed.). USA: Interlink Books. ISBN 978-1-56656-404-5.
