= Nakasu-Kawabata Station =

Metro station in Fukuoka, Japan

Coordinates: 33°35′41″N 130°24′23″E

K09 H01 Nakasu-Kawabata Station 中洲川端駅
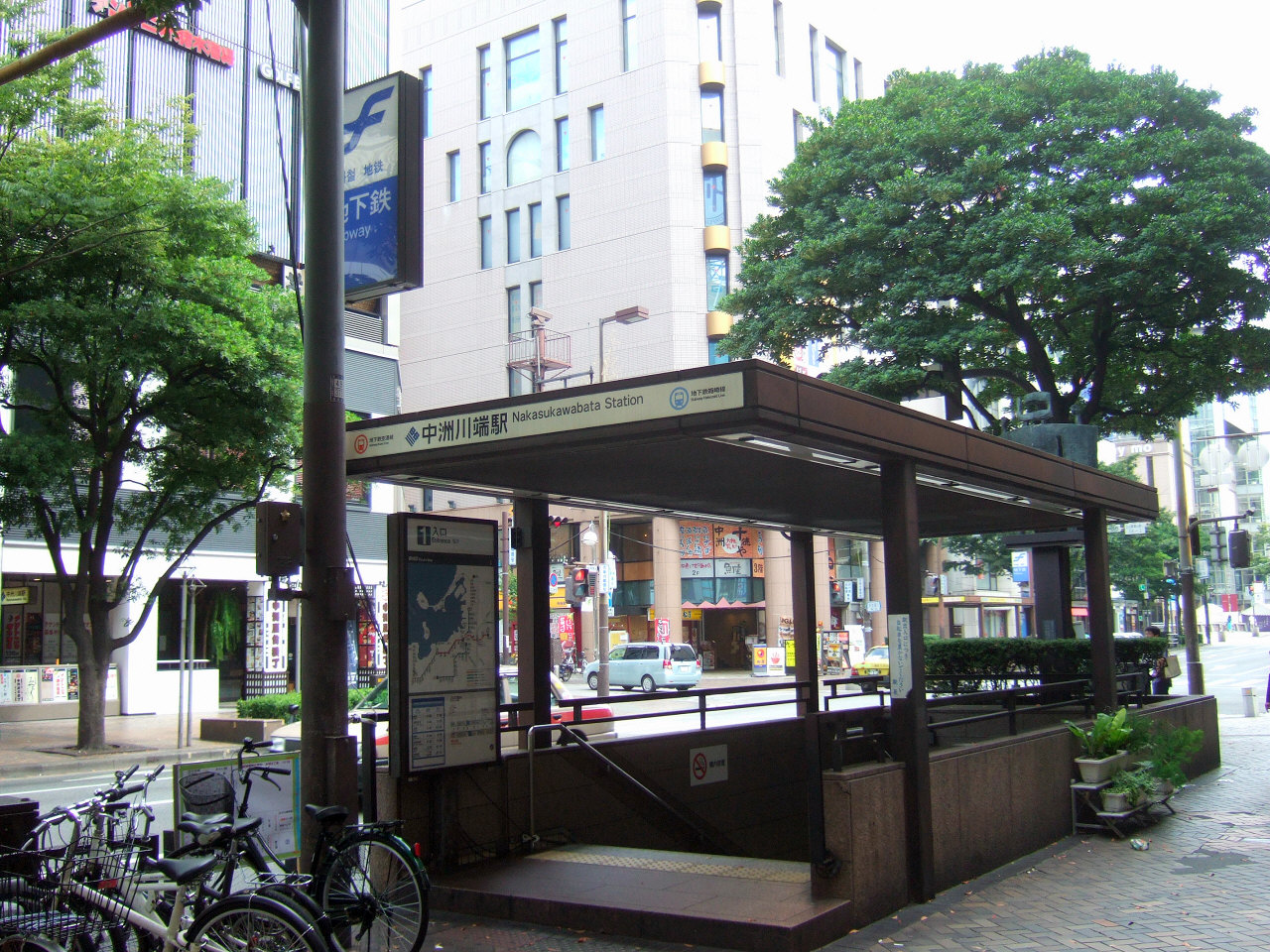
- Entrance No.1 in July 2008

General information
- Location: Kami-Kawabatachō, Hakata, Fukuoka, Fukuoka （福岡市博多区上川端町） Japan
- System: Fukuoka City Subway station
- Operator: Fukuoka City Subway
- Lines: Airport Line; Hakozaki Line

Other information
- Station code: K09; H01

History
- Opened: 20 April 1982; 44 years ago

Passengers
- 2006: 10,837 daily

Services
Preceding station	Fukuoka City Subway	Following station
Tenjin K08 towards Meinohama	Airport Line	Gion K10 towards Fukuoka Airport
Terminus	Hakozaki Line	Gofukumachi H02 towards Kaizuka
Location
- Location within Fukuoka city

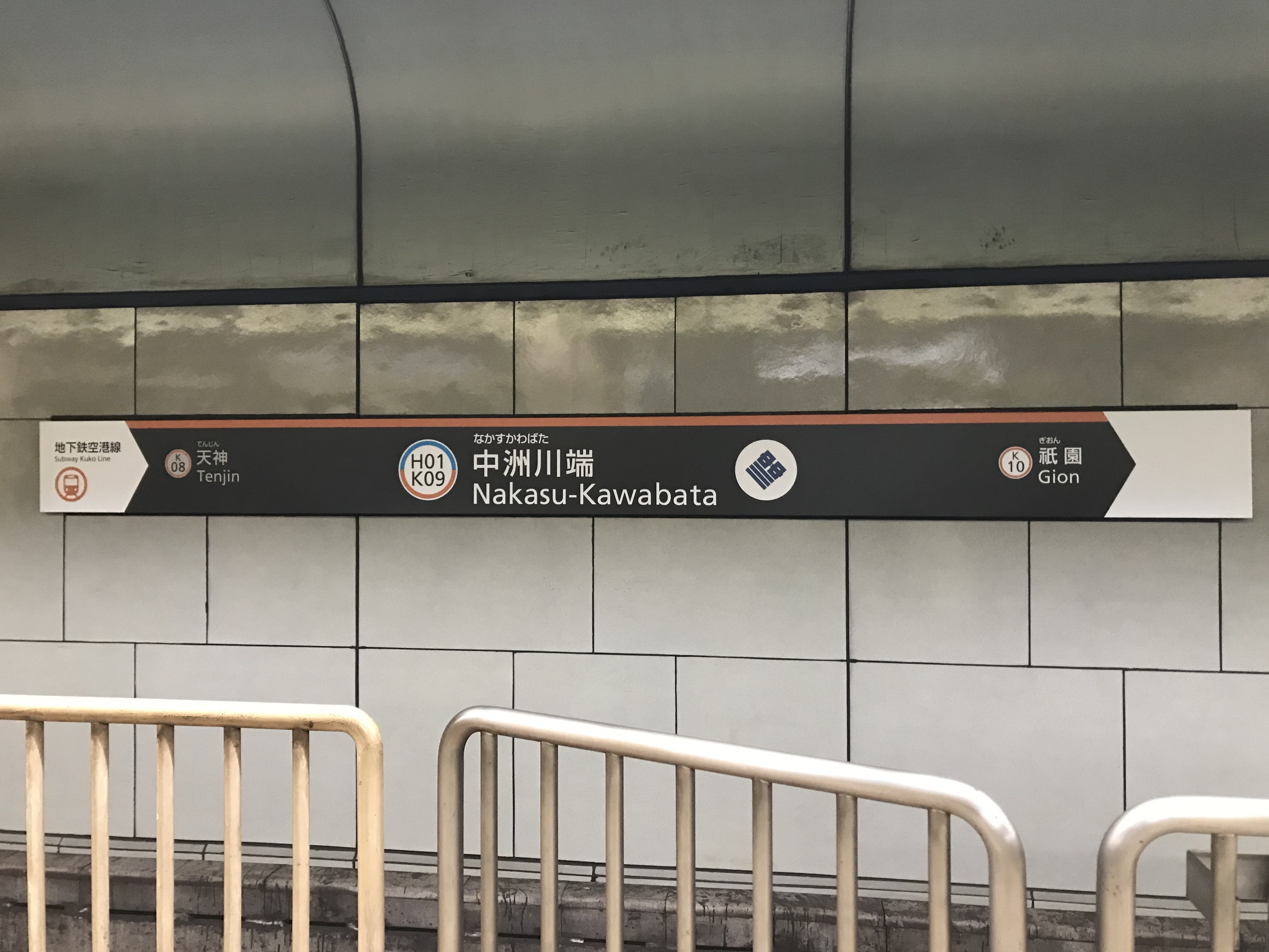
Station sign (Airport Line)

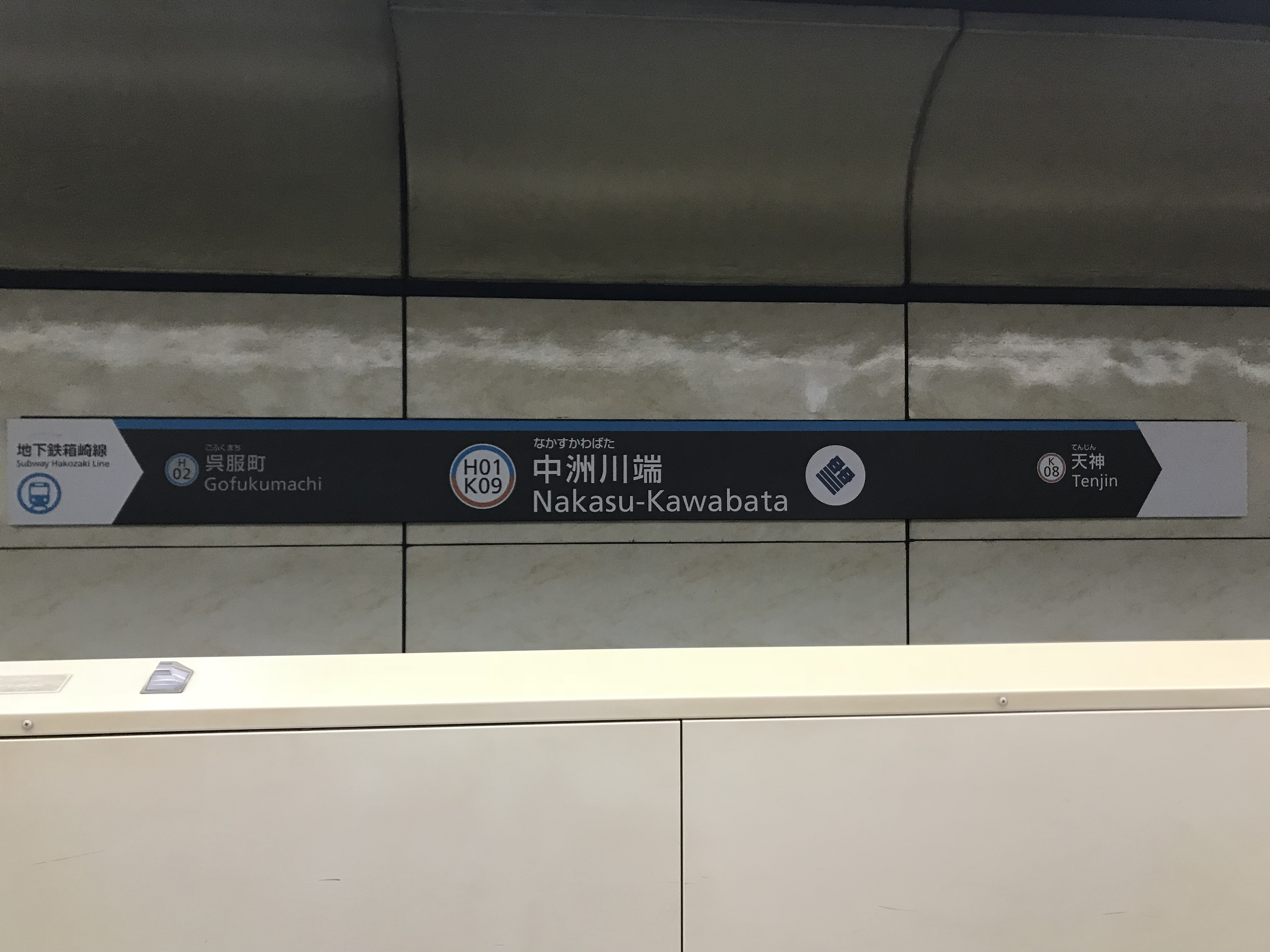
Station sign (Hakozaki Line)

Nakasu-Kawabata Station (中洲川端駅, Nakasu-Kawabata-eki) is a subway station on the Hakozaki Line and Airport Line located in Hakata-ku, Fukuoka in Japan. The station's symbol mark is of the Kanji "中" and "川" combined, looking like Happi's motif.

== Lines ==
- Fukuoka City Subway
  - Airport Line
  - Hakozaki Line

== Platforms ==
1	■ Hakozaki Line	for Kaizuka
2	■ Hakozaki Line	for Tenjin, Nishijin and Meinohama
3	■ Airport Line	for Hakata and Fukuoka Airport
4	■ Airport Line	for Tenjin, Nishijin, Meinohama, Chikuzen-Maebaru and Karatsu

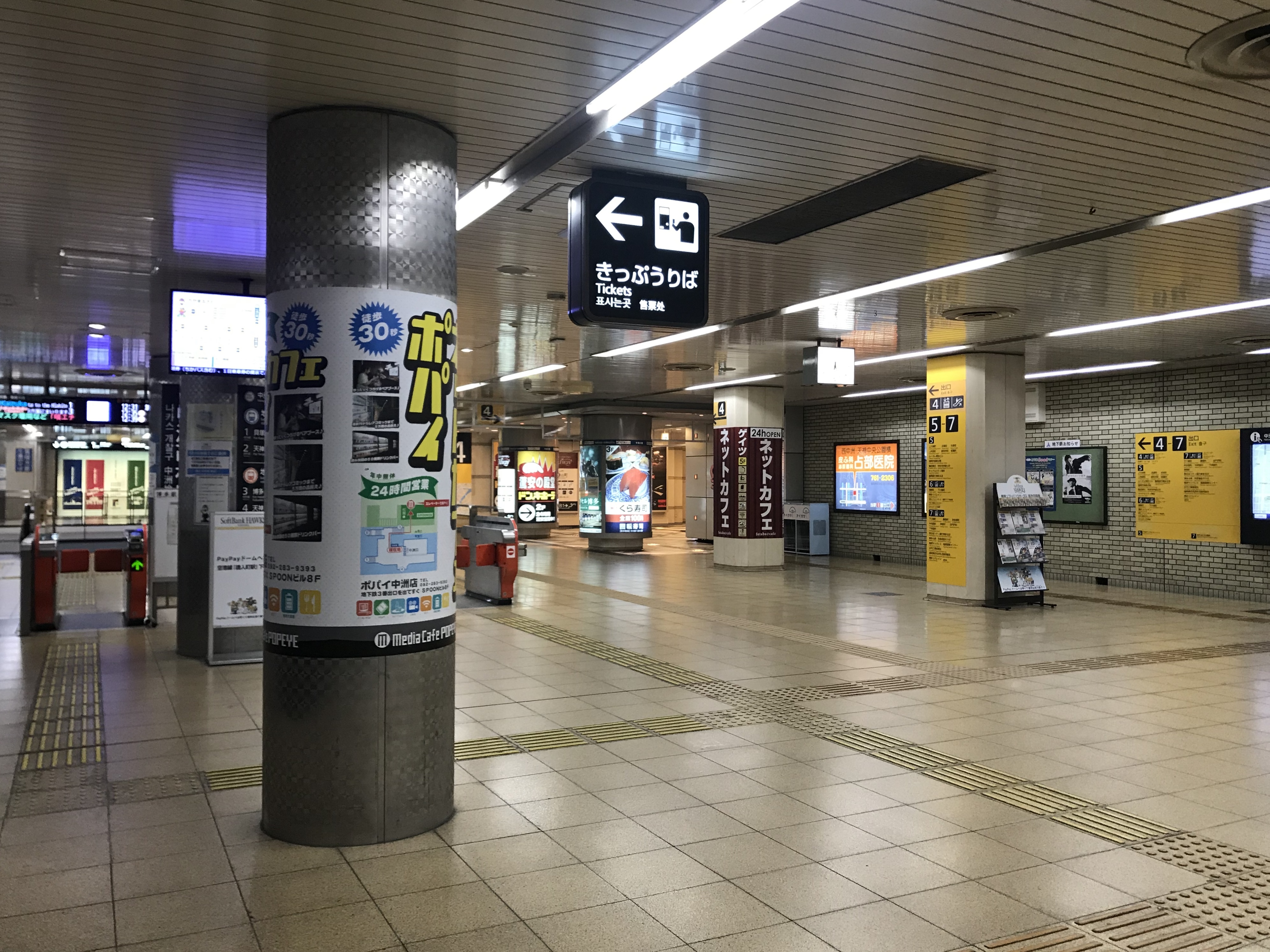
Concourse

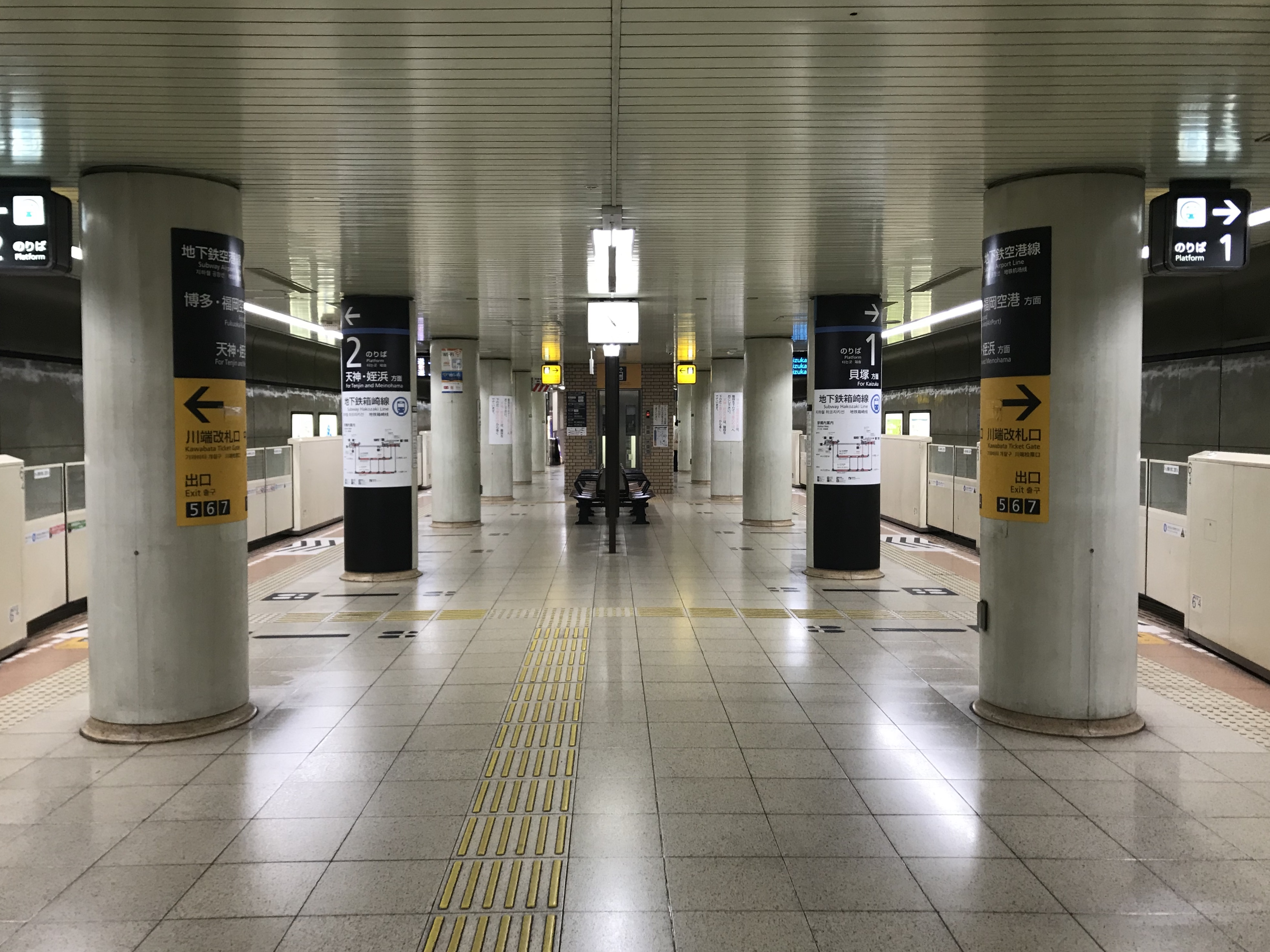
Platforms 1 & 2

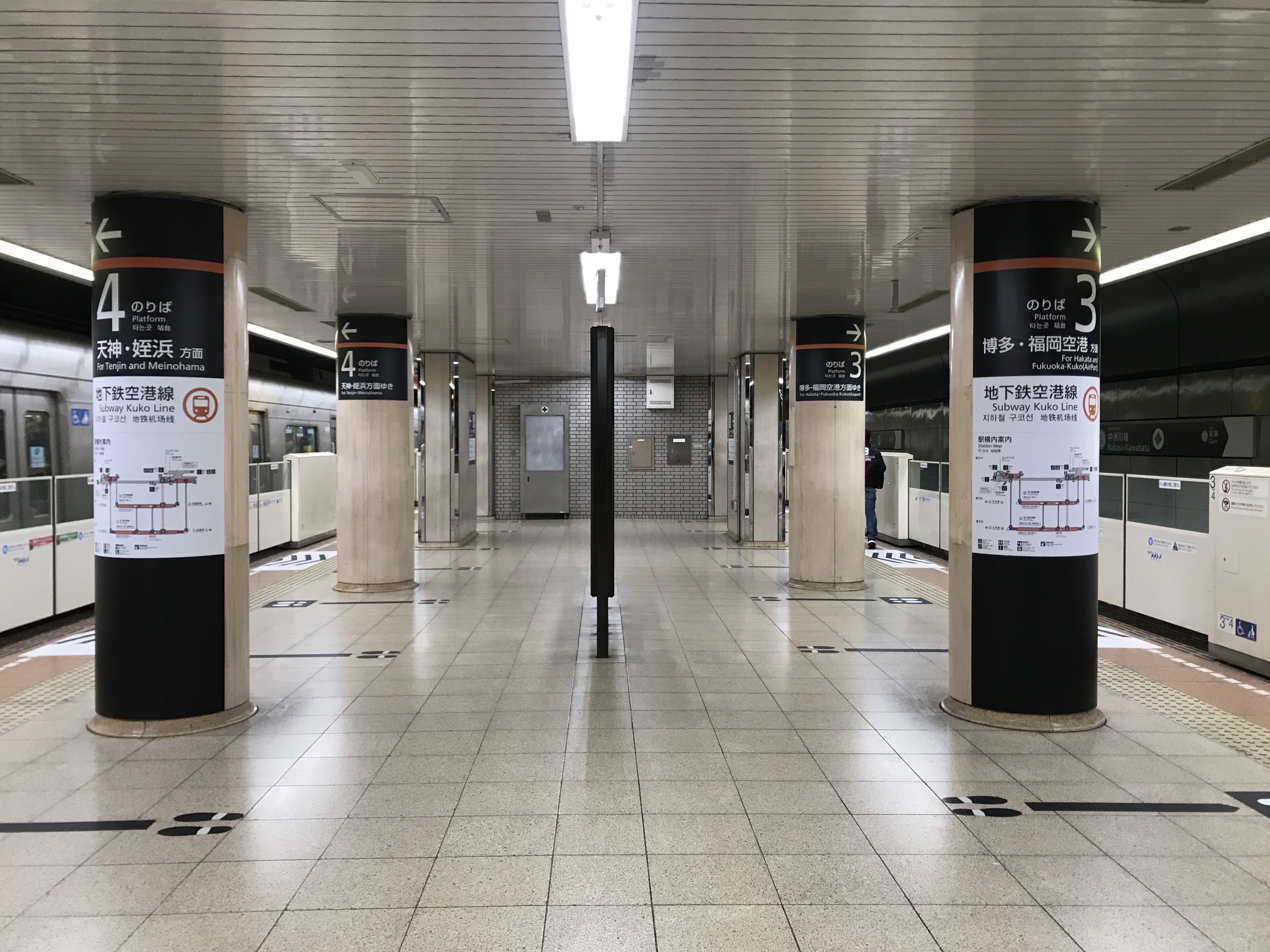
Platforms 3 & 4
- Some trains on the Hakozaki Line coming from Kaizuka stop at this station and continue on the Airport Line to Nishijin or Meinohama.
- Some trains on the Airport Line coming from Meinohama stop at this station and continue on the Hakozaki Line to Kaizuka.

== Vicinity ==
- Red light district
- Nakasu Area
- Canal City Hakata
- Hakata Riverain
  - Fukuoka Asian Art Museum
- Hakata-za Theater
- Naka and Hakata River
- Reisen Park
- Don Quijote (store)

== History ==
- April 20, 1982: Subway line extended from Tenjin Station.
- March 22, 1983: Line 1 (now Airport Line) to Hakata Station opened.
