= James Calhoun =

James Calhoun may refer to:

- James Calhoun (Maryland politician) (1743–1816), American politician, first mayor of Baltimore, Maryland
- James Calhoun (politician, born 1802) (1802–1852), American politician, first governor of the Territory of New Mexico
- James Calhoun (Mayor of Atlanta, Georgia) (1811–1875), American politician, sixteenth mayor of Atlanta, Georgia
- James Calhoun (soldier) (1845–1876), American soldier killed at the Battle of Little Big Horn
- Jim Calhoun (born 1942), American college basketball coach
