= Yatai (food cart) =

Small mobile food stall in Japan

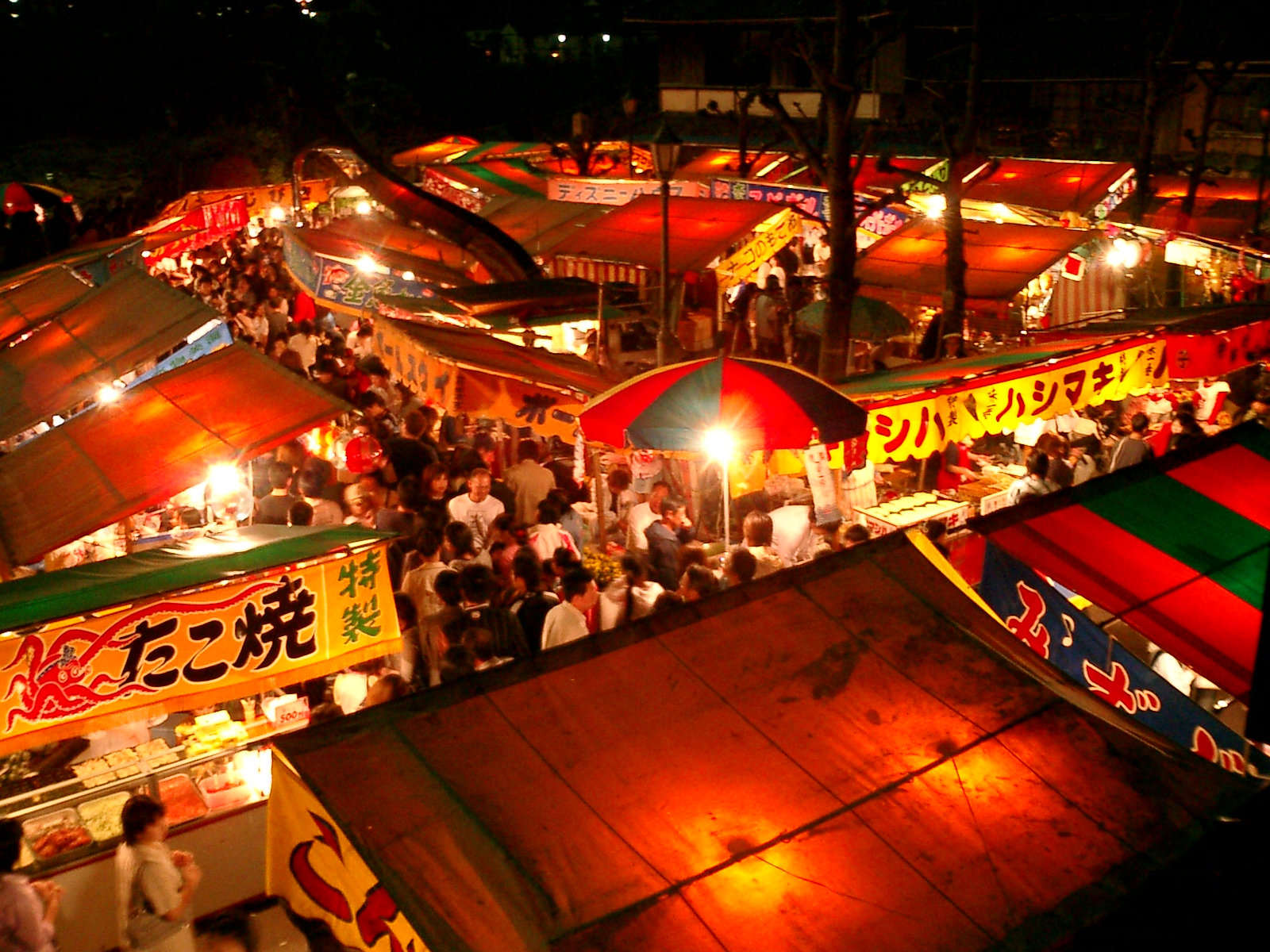
Yatai at a summer festival

A yatai (屋台) is a small, mobile food stall in Japan typically selling ramen or other food. The name literally means "shop stand".

The stall is set up in the early evening on walkways and removed late at night or in the early morning hours.

Though the practice of mobile food stands dates back to the 17th century, yatai became popular and widespread in the Meiji period (1868–1912) and were two-wheeled pushcarts constructed of wood. Yatai were popular during and following World War II, but Japanese authorities imposed regulations ahead of the 1964 Tokyo Olympics, citing health concerns. Today, they are prevalent in Fukuoka, but continue to dwindle.

== Carts ==
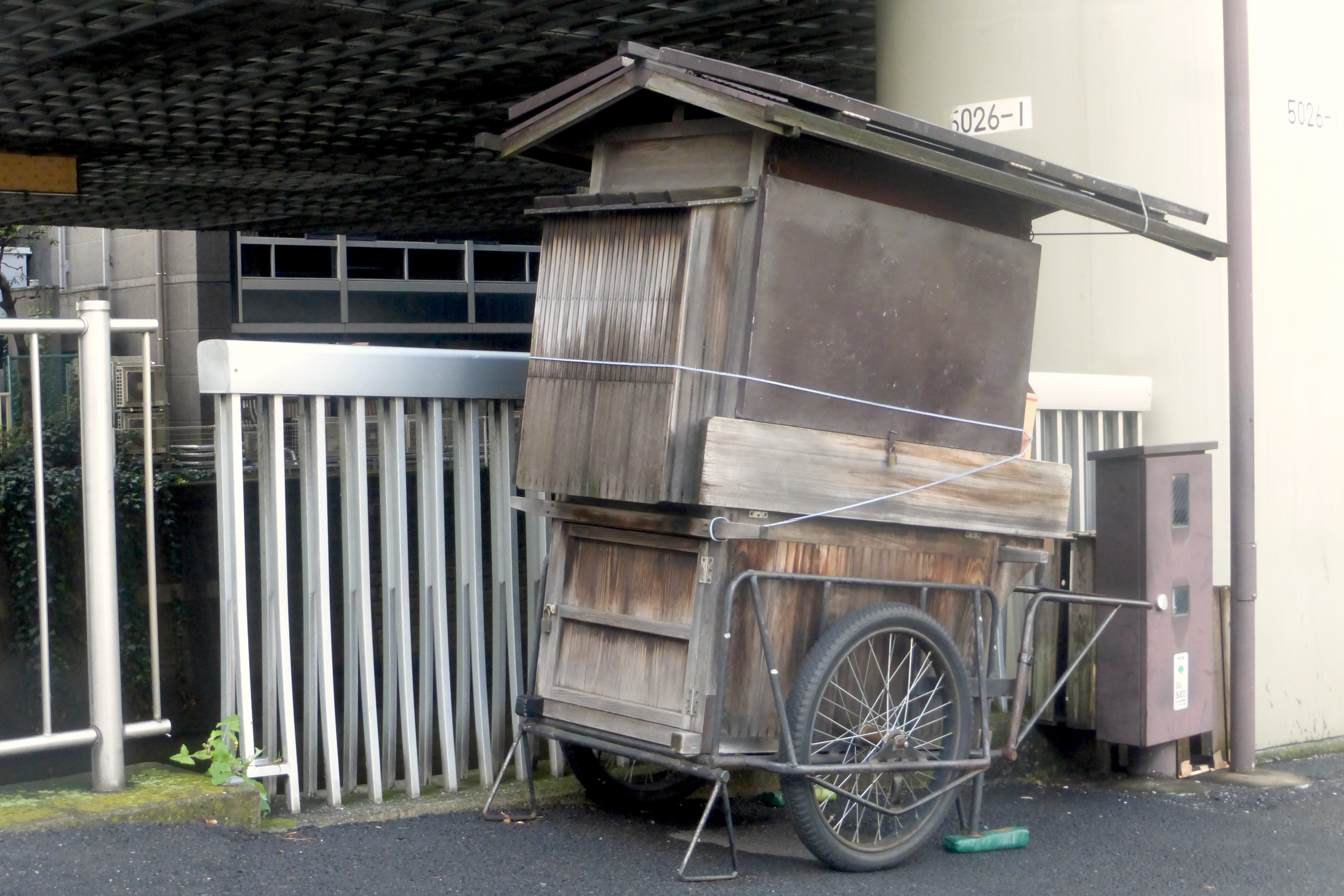
A yatai in Tokyo area during its closed hours

Yatai are typically wooden carts on wheels, equipped with kitchen appliances and seating. Handles and seating fold into the cart while it is being transported. A pushcart usually measures 3 by 2.5 meters. Vendors serve a variety of foods such as ramen, gyoza, and tempura. Beer, sake, and shōchū are usually available. Carts open after sunset and close in the early morning.

== History ==
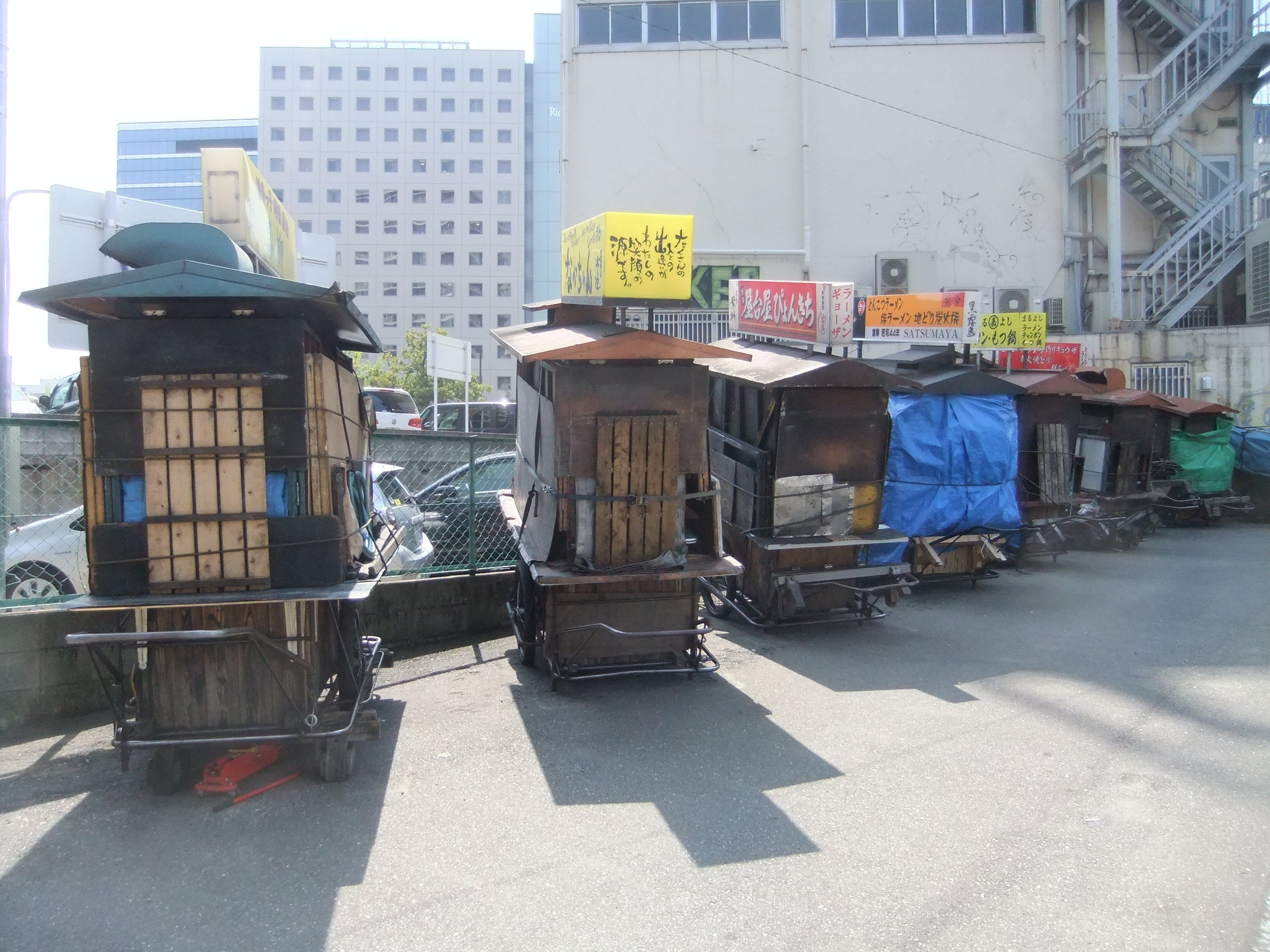
Closed yatai in a car park in Fukuoka, Japan

Many temporary spring yatai for cherry blossom season, 2019

Yatai selling buckwheat soba date back at least to the 1600s, and major cities such as Tokyo could have thousands. A reference to yatai in the modern sense is found as early as 1710. The word appears in an Edo-period sharebon, a genre of literature revolving around the pleasure quarters.

Yatai are descended from food stalls established outside of Buddhist shrines from the 5th to 7th century. Historian Hiroaki Ichikawa has said the origins of contemporary yatai are in the Tokugawa period, during which dignitaries of the court would often travel between the capital and their homes. As these dignitaries traveled, yatai provided a simple food option.

Yatai saw a brief resurgence in the 1900s as industrialization contributed to rice shortages, and farmers flocked to the city. Kobayashi Kurasaburo, a leftist intellectual, condemned the rise of yatai carts as a product of industrialization eradicating traditional Japanese food culture. The presence of large industrial workforces in urban centers often corresponded to the presence of yatai, and this included yatai run by foreigners to Japan, particularly from occupied countries, such as Taiwan and Korea. After Japan's surrender in 1945, yatai flourished as Japan rebuilt its economic infrastructure, though many operated illegally or through a black market. Yatai at the time served gyoza, Japanese dumplings, heavily seasoned with garlic, which was thought to increase heartiness. This marked an era of standardization for yatai, as corporations, seeing an economic opportunity, began selling "ready-made" yatai carts in the 1950s, in exchange for a portion of sales.

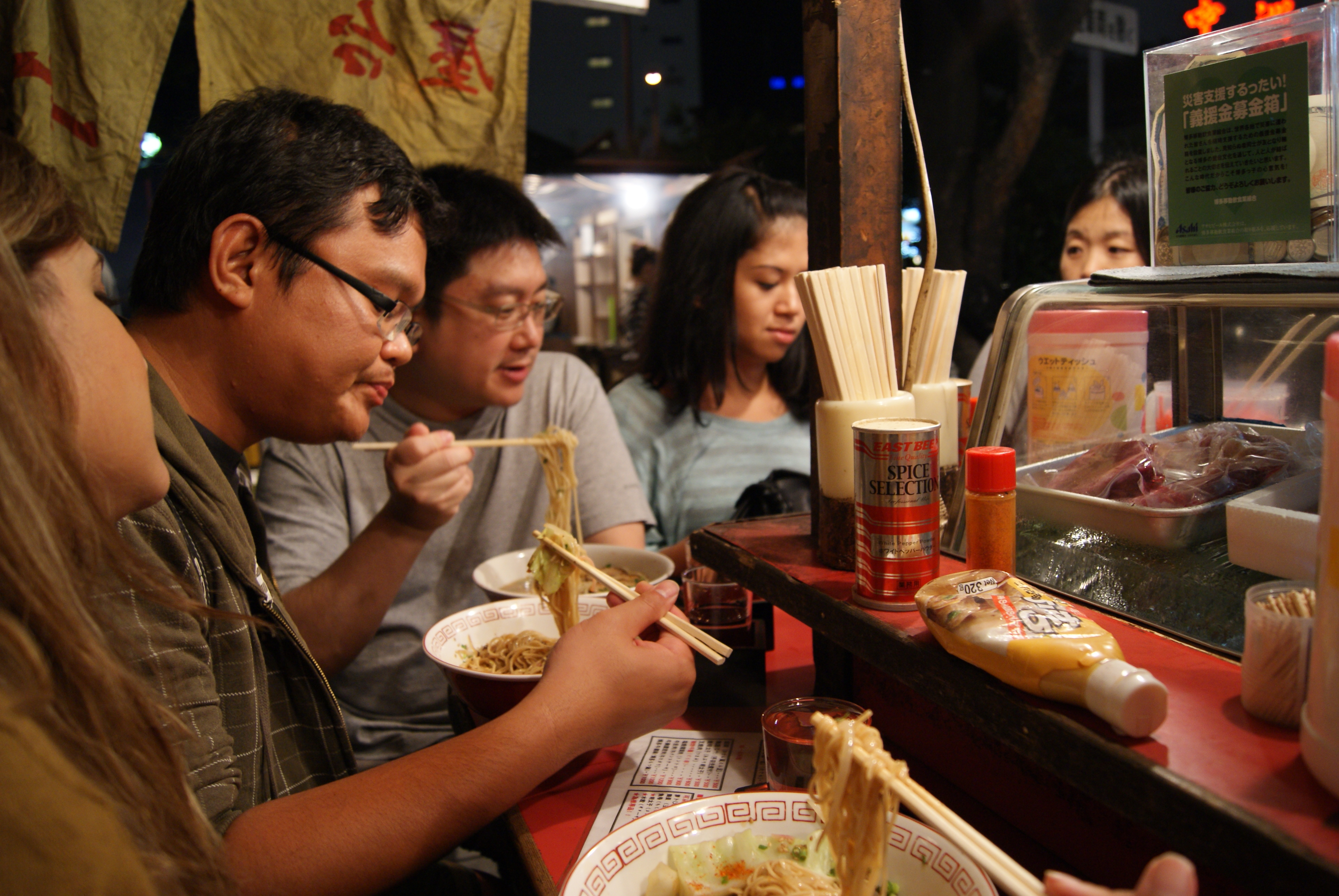
A yatai selling ramen beside the Naka-gawa (Naka river) in Fukuoka, Fukuoka Prefecture, Japan.

As Japan's economy boomed, many of the yatai transformed into storefronts, giving rise, particularly, to several ramen chains, such as Harugiya Ramen in Tokyo and Ide Shoten in Wakayama. However, city officials grew wary of health risks posed by the traveling food stands and, ahead of the 1964 Tokyo Olympics, new regulations were created which led to a decline in yatai. In the 1970s, the yatai were often portrayed by media as romantic escapes from the pressures of the business world, profiling salarymen who abandoned business careers to operate pushcarts. Scholars suggest this was the product of limited independent options for Japanese men in the time on account of a widespread salaryman system of lifetime corporate employment.

=== In Fukuoka Prefecture ===
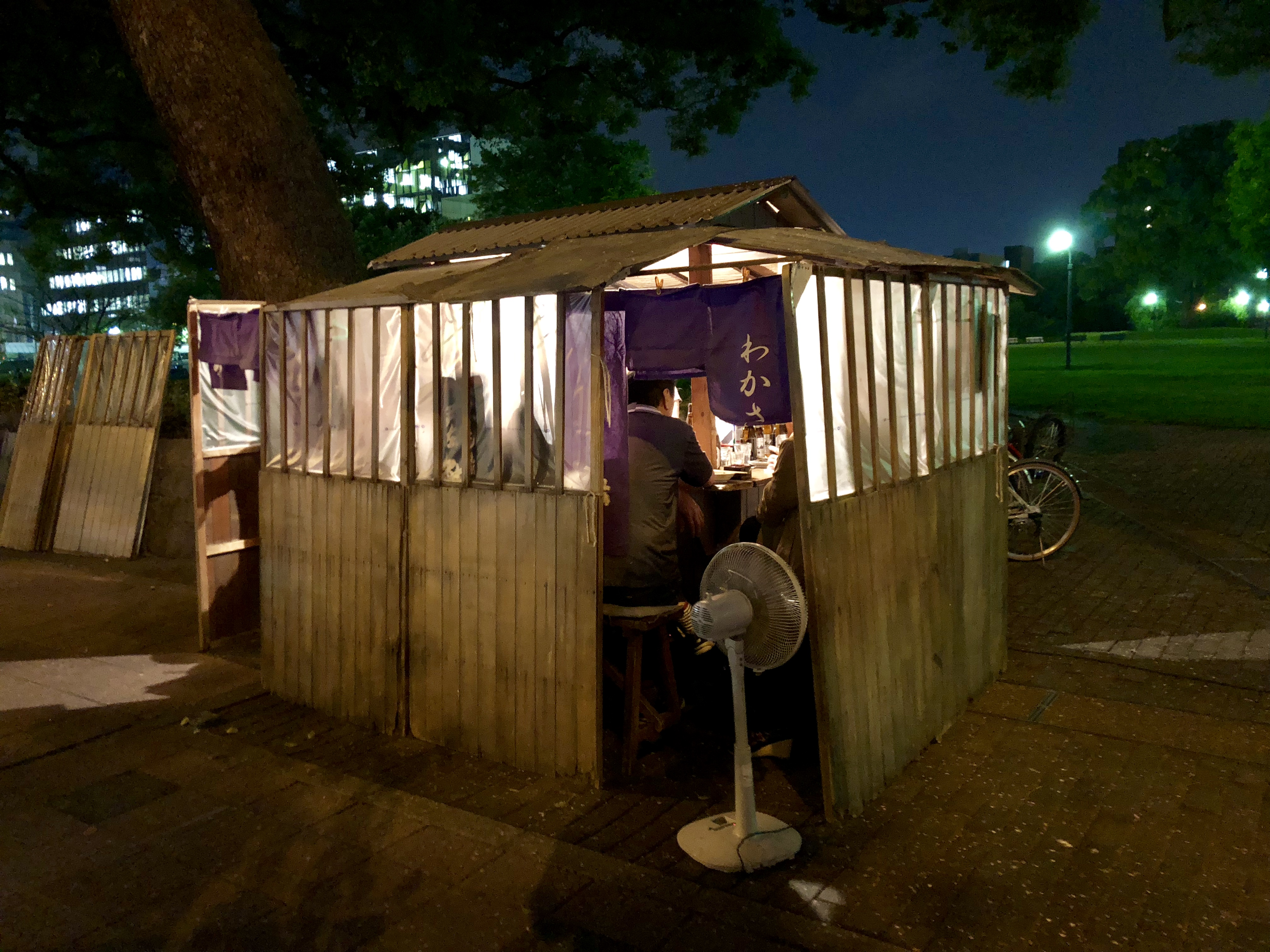
Wakasa, the last yatai to operate in Kumamoto Prefecture (closed 2025)

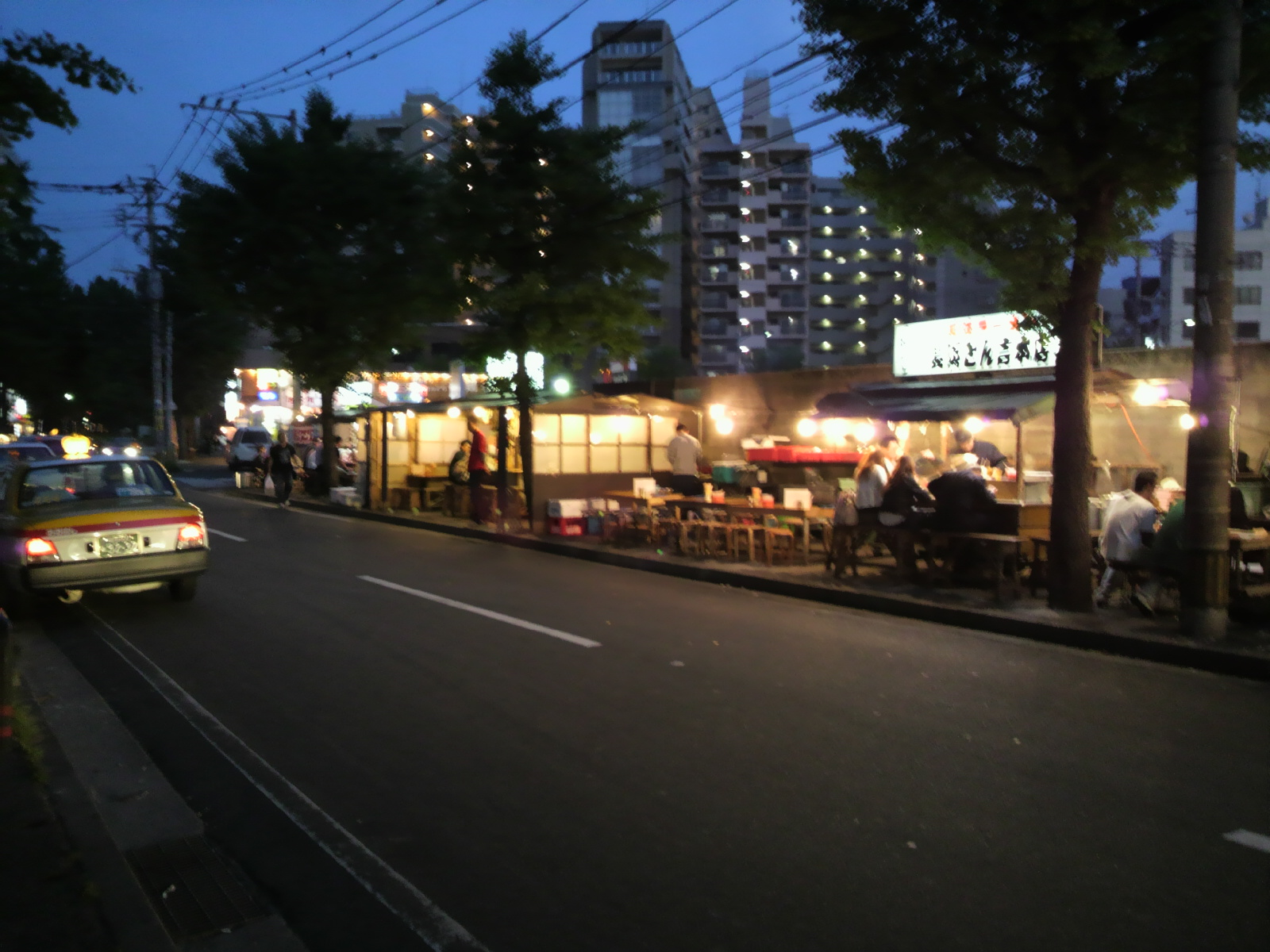
Yatai in operation in Fukuoka City

The contemporary hub of yatai culture are the Nakasu and Tenjin districts in Fukuoka City of Fukuoka Prefecture. As yatai regulations were implemented at the local level across Japan, Fukuoka's yatai operators created a trade association and were mostly unaffected. The number of yatai has dwindled in most major metropolitan areas, though leveled in the early 21st century in response to Japan's economic stagnation and yatai's relatively low cost. Nonetheless, in Fukuoka prefecture, the number of carts has declined since the 1960s from 450 to just 100 as of December 2018. The process has been accelerated by a 1994 law stating that yatai must be passed to a direct descendant, or closed, upon the retirement of the operator. However, Fukuoka has relaxed these regulations and recently announced the availability of 14 new licenses as of 2019.

=== In Kumamoto Prefecture ===
In Kumamoto Prefecture, just south of Fukuoka, there had been a single remaining yatai in Kumamoto City, Wakasa (わかさ), holding the last remaining license in the prefecture. The proprietress served oden and an assortment of drinks. The stall closed in May 2025 after 50 years in operation, leaving the prefecture without any remaining stalls.

== In culture ==
Satomura Kinzo wrote a short story about a yatai operator in 1933 titled "Chronicle of Starting a Shina Soba Shop." The story is a far-leftist look at the struggle of the working class, emphasizing the difficult financial situation of yatai operators at the time.

The ornate floats seen in some of the Japanese festivals, such as in the seasonal Takayama Festivals in Gifu Prefecture, are also known as yatai. In contrast to the human-borne floats common to most Japanese festivals, they consist of elaborately-decorated wheeled carts, some of which also contain intricate mechanical puppets which perform during their procession. During the remainder of the year, several of the floats are displayed in the town's festival float museum, known as the Yatai Kaikan (屋台会館).

== See also ==
- Food cart
- Food truck
- Mobile catering
- Pojangmacha
- Ramen shop
