= James Calhoun (Mayor of Atlanta, Georgia) =

American politician (1811–1875)

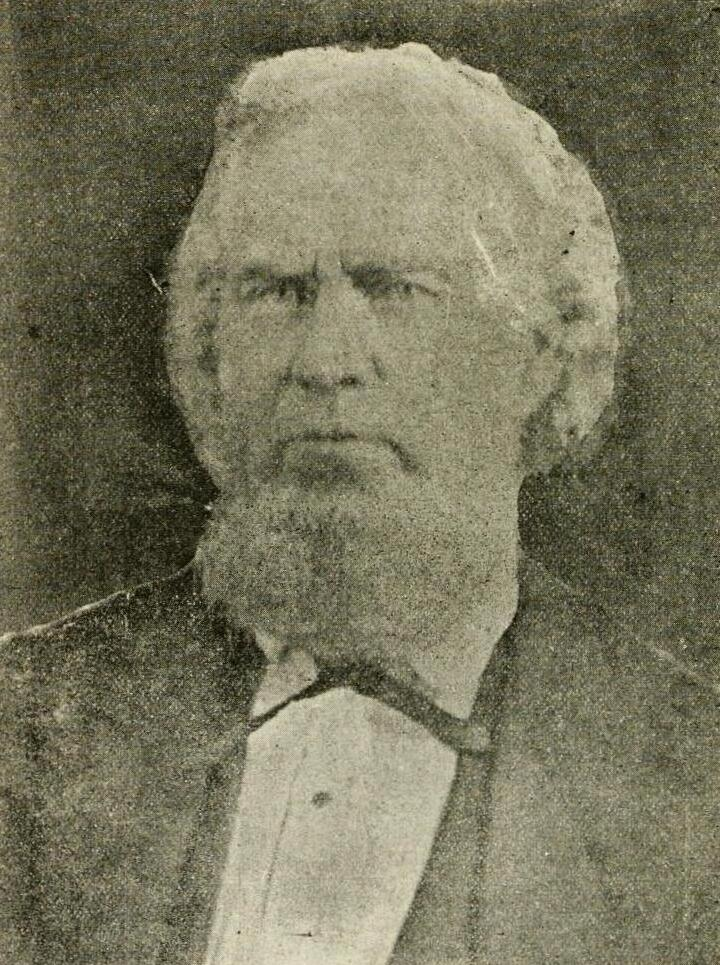
- Calhoun in a 1902 publication

16th Mayor of Atlanta
- In office 1862–1865
- Preceded by: Thomas Lowe (Acting)
- Succeeded by: James E. Williams

Personal details
- Born: James Montgomery Calhoun; February 12, 1811 Abbeville County, South Carolina, U.S.
- Died: October 1, 1875 (aged 64) Atlanta, Georgia, U.S.
- Resting place: Oakland Cemetery; Atlanta, Georgia
- Party: Whig
- Spouse: Emma Elizabeth Dabney (m. 1832; died 1860)
- Children: 10, including William
- Relatives: John C. Calhoun

James Montgomery Calhoun (February 12, 1811 – October 1, 1875) was an American politician who served as the sixteenth mayor of Atlanta, Georgia during the American Civil War, best known as the recipient of Union General William T. Sherman's famous "war is cruelty" (often misquoted as "war is hell") letter.

== Early life and education ==
James Montgomery Calhoun was born on February 12, 1811, at the Calhoun settlement on Long Crane Creek in Abbeville County, South Carolina, to Rebecca (née Tonnyhill) and William Calhoun. His father was a cousin of Democrat John C. Calhoun. His brother was Ezekiel Noble Calhoun, a surgeon of the Confederate Army.

Around 1827, Calhoun moved to Decatur, Georgia, to live with his brother Ezekiel. He attended a village school ran taught by David Kiddoo for two years and began studying law in 1831 under Hines Holt. He was admitted to the bar in February 1832.

== Career ==
Following his admission to the bar, Calhoun practiced law in Decatur. During the Creek War of 1836, he was a captain and commanded a cavalry company at Fort McCrary. Politically, Calhoun was a Whig in a largely Democratic district but was still elected to the Georgia General Assembly in 1837 from DeKalb County. From 1840 to 1850, he practiced law with his brother-in-law William Harris Dabney in DeKalb County. He also practiced law with B. F. Martin, A. W. Stone, and his son William Lowndes Calhoun. He also owned farms. He served in the Georgia State Senate in 1851.

In 1852, Calhoun moved to Atlanta. He served in the Georgia State Senate, representing Fulton County from 1855 to 1856. He was a member of the judiciary committee. He was vice president of the 1860 Constitutional Union Convention.

=== Mayor of Atlanta ===
Calhoun served four one-year terms as its mayor from 1862 to 1865. In 1863, he commissioned a volunteer militia to defend his city. When Union troops under the command of William T. Sherman drew near during the Atlanta campaign, much of the population of Atlanta, including Calhoun's wife and children, fled the city. This reduced the population of Atlanta from around 22,000 to less than 3,000 when the Confederate Army of Tennessee retreated from the city on September 1, 1864.

Calhoun surrendered the city to Union forces under Sherman on September 2, 1864, writing, "Sir: The fortune of war has placed Atlanta in your hands. As mayor of the city I ask protection of non-combatants and private property." A marker now stands at the corner of Peachtree Street and Alabama Street indicating where the surrender took place. Sherman replied by ordering the evacuation of the remaining civilian population of Atlanta on September 7, 1864. Calhoun and the city council protested this order, claiming that most of those who had not fled could not leave on account of their age, sickness, pregnancy, or destitution. In response, Sherman wrote back, accusing the Confederates of hypocrisy for invading Union territory and inflicting pains on American citizens, but only complaining when the reverse was done to them:

Gentleman: I have your letter of the 11th, in the nature of a petition to revoke my orders removing all the inhabitants from Atlanta. I have read it carefully, and give full credit to your statements of distress that will be occasioned, and yet shall not revoke my orders, because they were not designed to meet the humanities of the cause, but to prepare for the future struggles in which millions of good people outside of Atlanta have a deep interest. We must have peace, not only at Atlanta, but in all America. To secure this, we must stop the war that now desolates our once happy and favored country. To stop war, we must defeat the rebel armies which are arrayed against the laws and Constitution that all must respect and obey. To defeat those armies, we must prepare the way to reach them in their recesses, provided with the arms and instruments which enable us to accomplish our purpose. Now, I know the vindictive nature of our enemy, that we may have many years of military operations from this quarter; and, therefore, deem it wise and prudent to prepare in time. The use of Atlanta for warlike purposes in inconsistent with its character as a home for families. There will be no manufacturers, commerce, or agriculture here, for the maintenance of families, and sooner or later want will compel the inhabitants to go. Why not go now, when all the arrangements are completed for the transfer, instead of waiting till the plunging shot of contending armies will renew the scenes of the past month? Of course, I do not apprehend any such things at this moment, but you do not suppose this army will be here until the war is over. I cannot discuss this subject with you fairly, because I cannot impart to you what we propose to do, but I assert that our military plans make it necessary for the inhabitants to go away, and I can only renew my offer of services to make their exodus in any direction as easy and comfortable as possible. You cannot qualify war in harsher terms than I will.

War is cruelty, and you cannot refine it; and those who brought war into our country deserve all the curses and maledictions a people can pour out. I know I had no hand in making this war, and I know I will make more sacrifices to-day than any of you to secure peace. But you cannot have peace and a division of our country. If the United States submits to a division now, it will not stop, but will go on until we reap the fate of Mexico, which is eternal war. The United States does and must assert its authority, wherever it once had power; for, if it relaxes one bit to pressure, it is gone, and I believe that such is the national feeling. This feeling assumes various shapes, but always comes back to that of Union. Once admit the Union, once more acknowledge the authority of the national Government, and, instead of devoting your houses and streets and roads to the dread uses of war, I and this army become at once your protectors and supporters, shielding you from danger, let it come from what quarter it may. I know that a few individuals cannot resist a torrent of error and passion, such as swept the South into rebellion, but you can point out, so that we may know those who desire a government, and those who insist on war and its desolation. You might as well appeal against the thunder-storm as against these terrible hardships of war. They are inevitable, and the only way the people of Atlanta can hope once more to live in peace and quiet at home, is to stop the war, which can only be done by admitting that it began in error and is perpetuated in pride. We don't want your Negroes, or your horses, or your lands, or any thing you have, but we do want and will have a just obedience to the laws of the United States. That we will have, and if it involved the destruction of your improvements, we cannot help it. You have heretofore read public sentiment in your newspapers, that live by falsehood and excitement; and the quicker you seek for truth in other quarters, the better. I repeat then that, by the original compact of government, the United States had certain rights in Georgia, which have never been relinquished and never will be; that the South began the war by seizing forts, arsenals, mints, custom-houses, etc., etc., long before Mr. Lincoln was installed, and before the South had one jot or title of provocation. I myself have seen in Missouri, Kentucky, Tennessee, and Mississippi, hundreds and thousands of women and children fleeing from your armies and desperadoes, hungry and with bleeding feet. In Memphis, Vicksburg, and Mississippi, we fed thousands and thousands of the families of rebel soldiers left on our hands, and whom we could not see starve. Now that war comes to you, you feel very different. You deprecate its horrors, but did not feel them when you sent car-loads of soldiers and ammunition, and moulded shells and shot, to carry war into Kentucky and Tennessee, to desolate the homes of hundreds and thousands of good people who only asked to live in peace at their old homes, and under the Government of their inheritance. But these comparisons are idle. I want peace, and believe it can only be reached through union and war, and I will ever conduct war with a view to perfect an early success. But, my dear sirs, when peace does come, you may call on me for any thing. Then will I share with you the last cracker, and watch with you to shield your homes and families against danger from every quarter. Now you must go, and take with you the old and feeble, feed and nurse them, and build for them, in more quiet places, proper habitations to shield them against the weather until the mad passions of men cool down, and allow the Union and peace once more to settle over your old homes in Atlanta.

Yours in haste,

W.T. Sherman, Major-General commanding

Union soldiers under Sherman occupied the city for two months and burned much of it on November 15, 1864, in preparation for the March to the Sea.

== Personal life ==
Calhoun married Emma Elizabeth Dabney, daughter of Anderson W. Dabney, in 1832. They had 10 children, Emma Elizabeth, William Lowndes, Anna, Chattanooga, Hannah Rebecca, James Tyre, Patrick Henry, John Dabney, Anna Eliza, and Caroline C. His wife died in 1860. He lived on Washington Street in Atlanta.

Calhoun died on October 1, 1875, in Atlanta. He was buried in Oakland Cemetery.

Preceded by Thomas F. Lowe (acting)	Mayor of Atlanta; 1862–1865	Succeeded by James E. Williams
