= Nakasu =

Red-light district in Fukuoka, Japan

Coordinates: 33.593647°N 130.405295°E

Nakasu (中洲) is the red-light district of Fukuoka City, Fukuoka Prefecture, Japan. It is an island between the sandbank of the Naka River (那珂川, Nakagawa) and the Hakata River (博多川, Hakatagawa). It is named after a popular, but very short-lived, entertainment quarter of Edo, which existed in the late 18th century. The name "Nakasu" can be translated as "the island in the middle", as Nakasu is an island between two rivers.

== Overview ==
Nakasu is the largest red-light district in western Japan. The number of restaurants and stores, including adult-entertainment establishments, is approximately 3,500, and over 60,000 people reportedly visit Nakasu every night. Nakasu is also home to a number of fashionable restaurants. Notable features in Nakasu includes the view of neon signs from the Fukuhaku Deai Bridge (福博であい橋), and yatai stalls along the Naka River. Once, fans of the local baseball team, Fukuoka SoftBank Hawks, dove from the Fukuhaku Deai Bridge into the river after the team won the championship. The nearest subway station from Nakasu is the Nakasu-Kawabata Station of the Fukuoka City Subway.

== History ==
Nakasu at night

In 1600, Kuroda Nagamasa, a daimyō of the Fukuoka-Han, created Nakasu to connect between current Chūō-ku and Hakata-ku by building two bridges over the rivers at the sandbank: Higashi Nakajima Bridge and Nishi Nakajima Bridge (currently Shōwa Street). Present day of Nakasu has 18 bridges in total: 7 of them are built at the side of the Chūō-ku, and 11 at the side of the Hakata-ku. Nakasu previously featured Tamaya, a department store of long standing, and movie theatres, although the center of commerce has moved to the Tenjin and Daimyō districts in Chūō-ku.

A shopping complex, Canal City Hakata, in neighbouring Sumiyoshi district, was established in 1996. On March 29, 2002, the Nakasu Special Investigators, a squad of the Fukuoka Prefectural Police, was formed to prevent crime. A huge commercial complex, the "gate's" was opened in 2006, at the site the Tamaya was located.

== In popular culture ==
- The 2012 video game Yakuza 5 features a fictional district called Nagasugai, based on Nakasu. This is where main series protagonist Kazuma Kiryu comes to start a new life as a taxi driver under the alias of Taichi Suzuki.
