= Hakata-za =

Kabuki theatre in Fukuoka, Fukuoka Prefecture, Japan

- 博多座
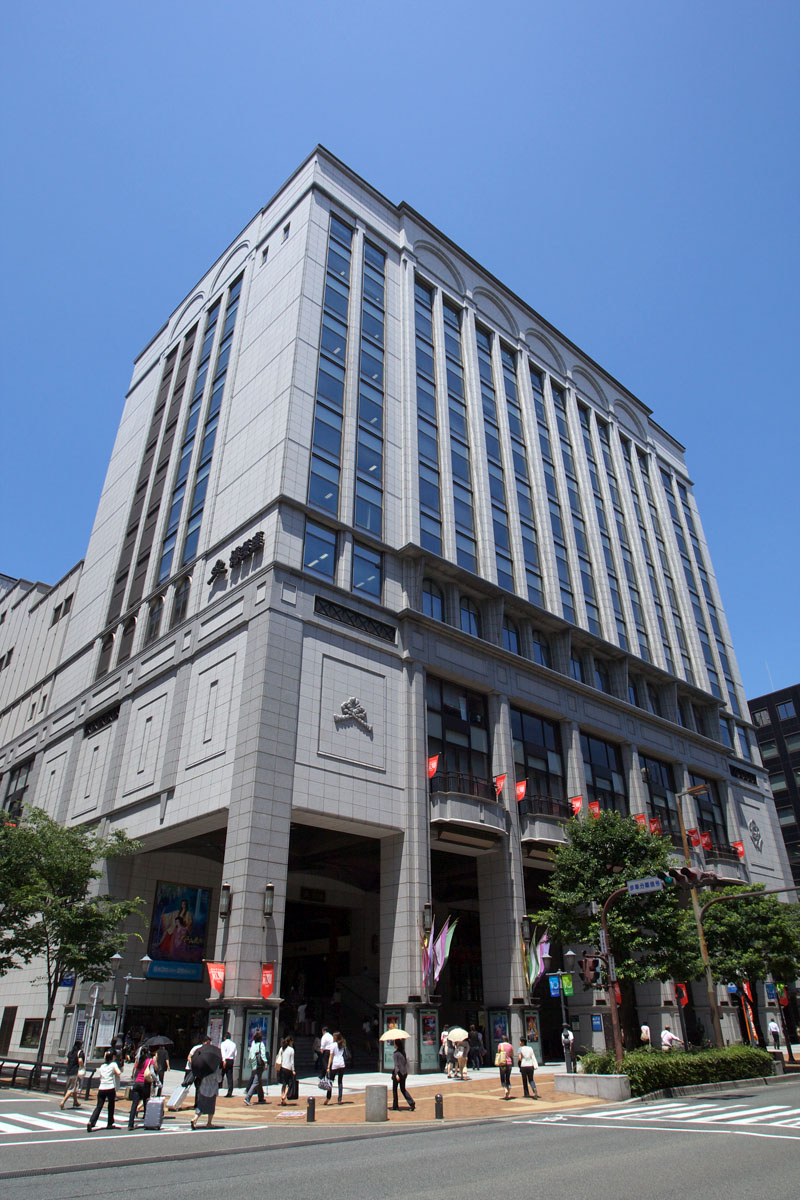
- Interactive map of Hakata-za
- Address: 2-1 Shimokawabata-machi; Hakata-ku; Fukuoka; Japan
- Coordinates: 33.595703°N 130.406477°E
- Owner: Hakata-za Corporation
- Capacity: 1,454
- Type: Kabuki theater

Construction
- Opened: 1999

Website
- Official website

The Hakata-za Theatre (博多座, Hakataza) is a kabuki theatre in Fukuoka, Fukuoka Prefecture, Japan, located near the Nakasu-Kawabata Station. It was originally constructed in 1996.

== Overview ==
The Hakata-za is a multipurpose theater that can be used in all theater genres, such as kabuki, musicals, and mainstream commercial plays (商業演劇, shōgyōengeki). The maximum number of seats is 1,500, which is one of the largest in Kyushu, and many groups come from all over Kyushu, Yamaguchi Prefecture, and elsewhere in western Japan. The theater is operated by Hakata-za Theater Co., Ltd., a public-private partnership funded by the city of Fukuoka, theater companies, and local companies.

The Hakata-za stage design concept is "Super Kabuki", a term coined by Ennosuke Ichikawa III in 1986. Stage features such as rotating stages, hanamichi, and orchestra pit can be set up depending on the performance's needs. With the intention of performing Miss Saigon in the original production version, the stage area can accommodate a full-scale helicopter, which is the centerpiece of that production (stage sleeves and depth are about 1.5 times the audience seat area). Wire-flying equipment are also installed in the ceiling.

During the Kabuki performance in June every year, the kabuki actors go on a ceremonial boat ride on the Hakata River, which runs next to the Hakata-za. The theater is open to the public every December. The Hakata Odori, a dance performance by geishas from the Hakata Kenban traditional arts association, is also performed here every year.

The Hakata-za is the first multi-day kabuki performance venue in Hakata since the closed Daihaku Theater. It is actually the second venue to use the name Hakata-za, as the first Hakata-za was opened by Otojirō Kawakami and his troupe in Chiyo, Hakata Ward in 1910.

Curtain seats are available depending on the performance.
