= Gion Station (Fukuoka) =

Metro station in Fukuoka, Japan

Coordinates: 33°35′39″N 130°24′53″E

K10 Gion Station 祇園駅
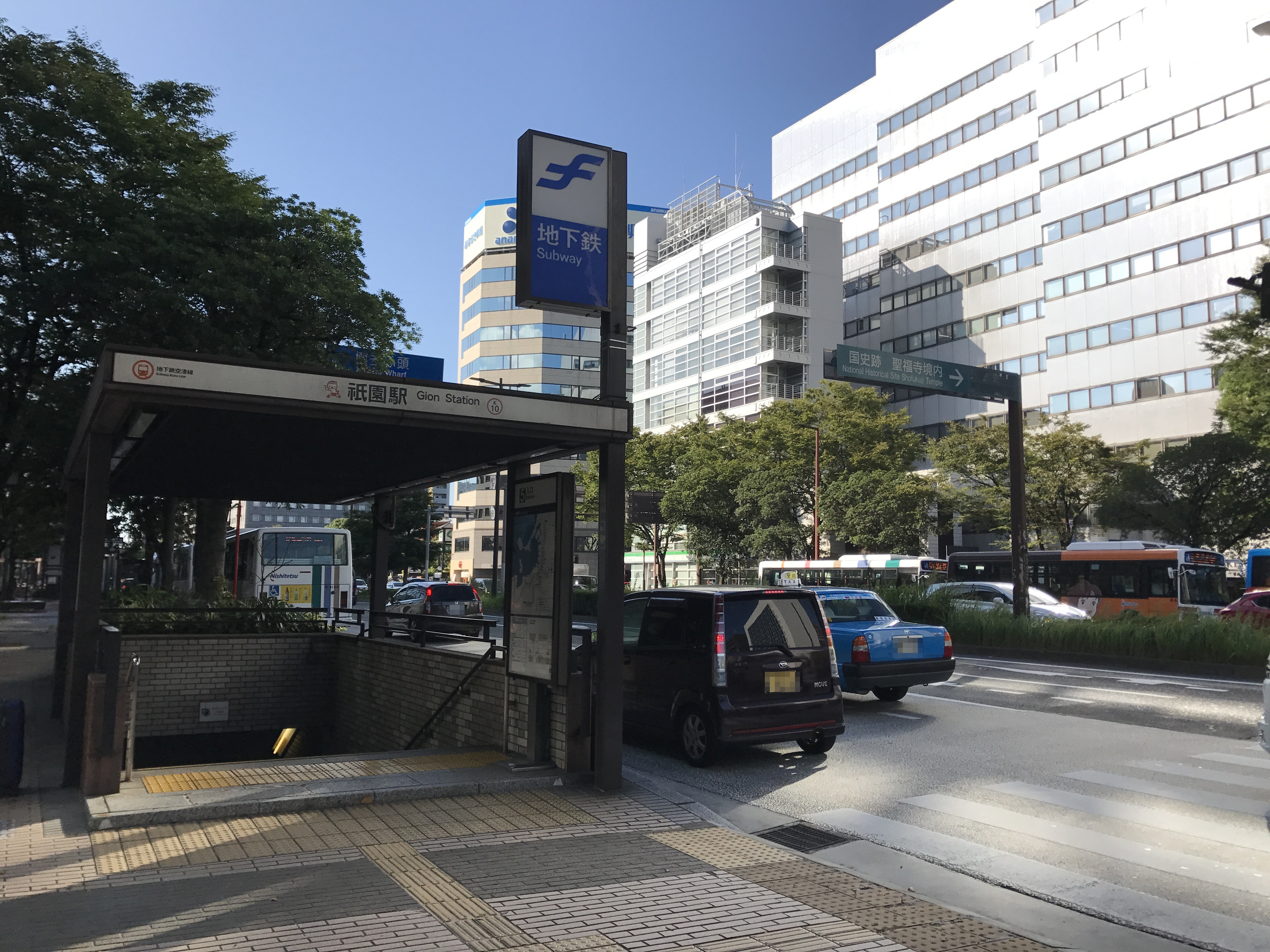
- Entrance No.5

General information
- Location: Hakata, Fukuoka, Fukuoka; Japan
- System: Fukuoka City Subway station
- Operator: Fukuoka City Subway
- Line: Airport Line

Other information
- Station code: K10

History
- Opened: 22 March 1983; 43 years ago

Passengers
- 2006: 5,243 daily

Services
Preceding station	Fukuoka City Subway	Following station
Nakasu-Kawabata K09 towards Meinohama	Airport Line	Hakata K11 towards Fukuoka Airport
Location
- Location within Fukuoka city

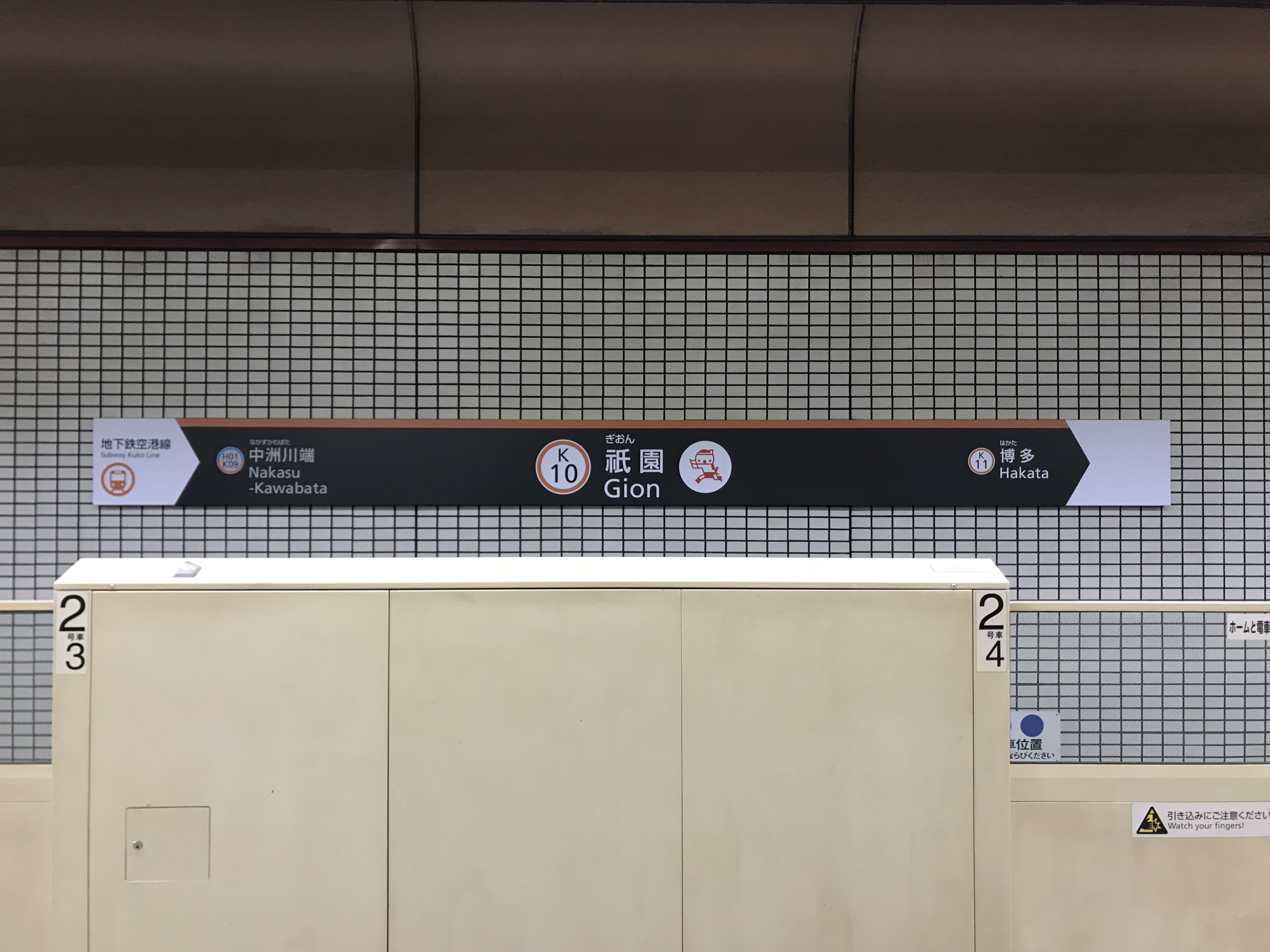
Station sign for Hakata bound trains

Gion Station (祇園駅, Gion-eki) is a train station located in Hakata-ku, Fukuoka in Japan. Its station symbol is a young male dressed in happi, representing the famous Hakata Gion Yamakasa, held in July each year.

== Lines ==
- Fukuoka City Subway
  - Airport Line

== Platforms ==
1	■ Airport Line	for Hakata and Fukuoka Airport
2	■ Airport Line	for Tenjin, Meinohama and Chikuzen-Maebaru

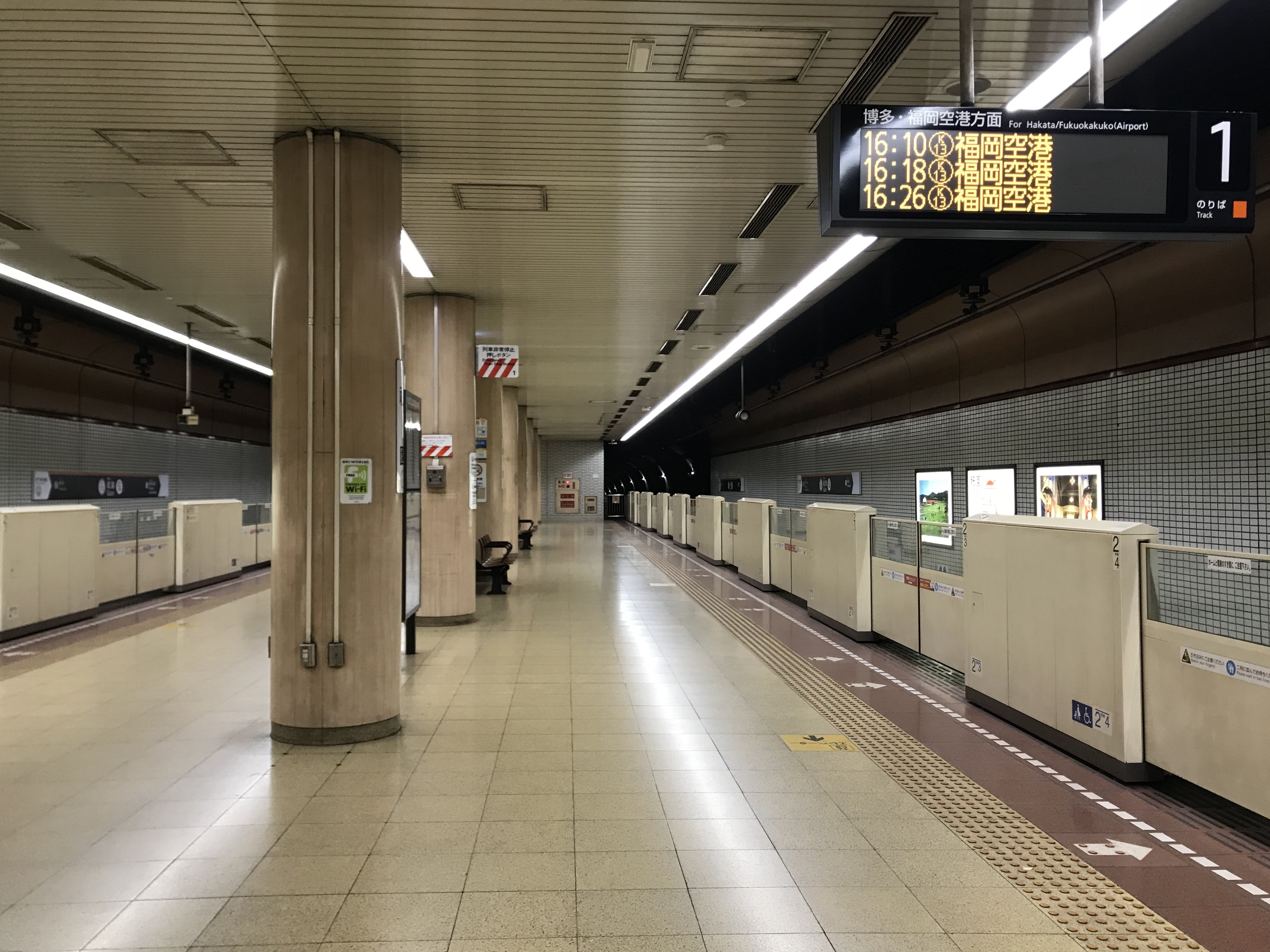
Platform

== Vicinity ==
- Canal City Hakata
- TVQ Kyūshū Broadcasting
- Fukuoka Chamber of Commerce
- Hakata Ward Office
- Kushida Shrine
- Tochoji Temple
- Hakata Machiya Folk Museum

== Sources ==
- https://gionfestival.org/blog-ofune-boko-return/
