= Jared Whitaker =

American politician (1818–1884)

Jared Irwin Whitaker (May 4, 1818 – May 3, 1884) was a Georgia newspaperman, publisher of the Daily Intelligencer from 1864 to 1871, and earlier served as a politician. Defeating a three-term incumbent to become the 14th Mayor of Atlanta, Georgia, during the early days of the American Civil War, he left office early when appointed as Commissary General of Georgia.

== Early life, education and marriages ==
Whitaker was born in Atlanta in 1818 and named for his maternal grandfather Jared Irwin, a two-term Governor of Georgia. This was a small town until after the Civil War; he received a basic education.

He married Susan Mabry Taliaferro (1831–1853) of Atlanta. After her death, in 1854 he married Nannie E. Allen (1830–1901), who was also considerably younger than he. In total Whitaker had several children by his two wives.

== Politics ==
Whitaker became interested in politics and ran for mayor of Atlanta. In 1861, he was elected after a contentious campaign, in which he defeated three-term incumbent mayor William Ezzard. Whitaker did not finish his term, as he was appointed by the governor as Commissary General of Georgia's state troops during the Civil War. He was succeeded as Mayor of Atlanta by Thomas Lowe on December 13, 1861.

== Publisher ==
In 1864 Whitaker bought and became publisher of the Atlanta newspaper, The Daily Intelligencer. He continued to employ John H. Steele as editor, who had served in that position since 1860. Steele died in 1871.

The newspaper closed shortly afterward in April 1871 as it was unable to compete financially with the new, larger Atlanta Constitution, which had aggressively expanded. The Constitution bought all its mechanical equipment at auction in June 1871. Whitaker purchased the newspaper's archives and records.

Jared Whitaker died in 1884, one day before his 66th birthday; he is buried in Atlanta's Oakland Cemetery, as are most of his family members.

Preceded by William Ezzard	Mayor of Atlanta; 1861	Succeeded by Thomas F. Lowe (acting)
