= Thomas Lowe (politician) =

American politician (1812–1875)

Thomas F. Lowe (died November 18, 1875) was an American musician, businessman, and politician who served as the acting mayor of Atlanta, during the early part of the American Civil War.

In 1858, T. F. Lowe was elected as an alderman representing Atlanta's Second Ward. Lowe and fellow future Atlanta mayor William Ezzard were among a group of investors that chartered the Atlanta Mutual Insurance and Stock Company in 1859.

In November 1861, he took over as Atlanta's mayor after incumbent Jared Whitaker was appointed to head the commissary and logistics activities for Georgia's state troops. He was not a candidate for election to a full term, and was succeeded by James M. Calhoun. He was commissioned as a colonel in the Georgia state militia. As a violin soloist, he was a local favorite and played many recitals in Atlanta and Decatur, even during the war.

Lowe died in Mount Airy, Georgia, and is buried in Atlanta's Oakland Cemetery.

== Notes ==
Preceded by Jared Whitaker	Mayor of Atlanta; 1861	Succeeded by James M. Calhoun
