= Canal City Hakata =

Shopping and entertainment complex in Fukuoka, Japan

Coordinates: 33°35′28″N 130°24′38″E

Canal City Hakata (キャナルシティ博多) is a shopping and entertainment complex in Fukuoka, Japan. Often referred to as " the city within the city," it hosts shops, cafes, restaurants, a theater, a game center, cinemas, two hotels, and a canal, which runs through the complex.

Located adjacent to Fukuoka's entertainment district, and between the commercial and retail core of the city, Canal City has become a tourist attraction and commercial success for Fukuoka. It is the largest private development in the history of Japan ($1.4 billion for 234,460 m^{2} (2.5 million sq. ft.)). The complex is built with a distinctive fanciful style, with curving sculptures and fountains. From the complex, the city of Fukuoka is hardly visible, which creates an atmosphere like an oasis away from the rest of the town.

== History ==
Canal City Hakata began construction on June 3, 1993, and opened for business on April 20, 1996. The complex was designed by The Jerde Partnership and operated by Fukuoka Jisho. With Canal City in business, areas around the complex began to see increased success as well. The nearby food markets, in decline and seeing little business, began to rebuild and rehire shops because of the foot traffic from the mall.

In 2001, the Megastore Building was renovated and renamed the South Building. In addition, the Ramen Stadium was opened, featuring a handful of Fukuoka's best ramen restaurants. In 2010, the Canal City Theater opened, followed by the East Building a year later. In 2016, Canal City Hakata celebrated its 20th anniversary with Japan's largest 3D projection mapping and the "Aqua Panorama" fountain. In 2017, the mall reached its peak of 17 million visitors, totaling over 300 million visitors.

In 2023, the East Building was closed due to slow sales. Fukuoka Jisho planned to demolish it and replace it with a luxury condominium, but it remained standing due to rising demolition costs caused by labor shortages. On September 4, 2026, the East Building reopened with 16 stores.

== Gallery ==
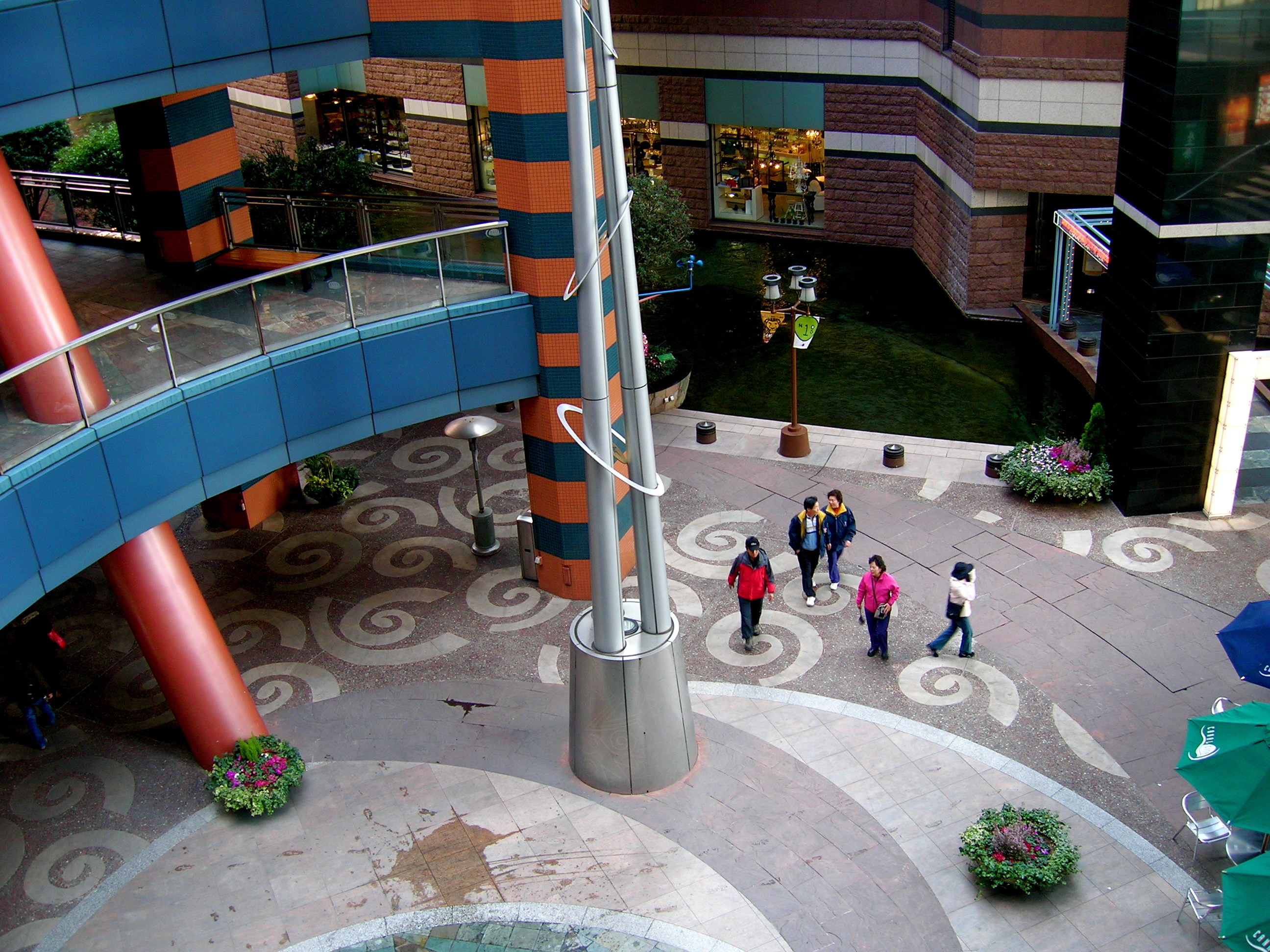
Swirl patterns dominate the design of Canal City

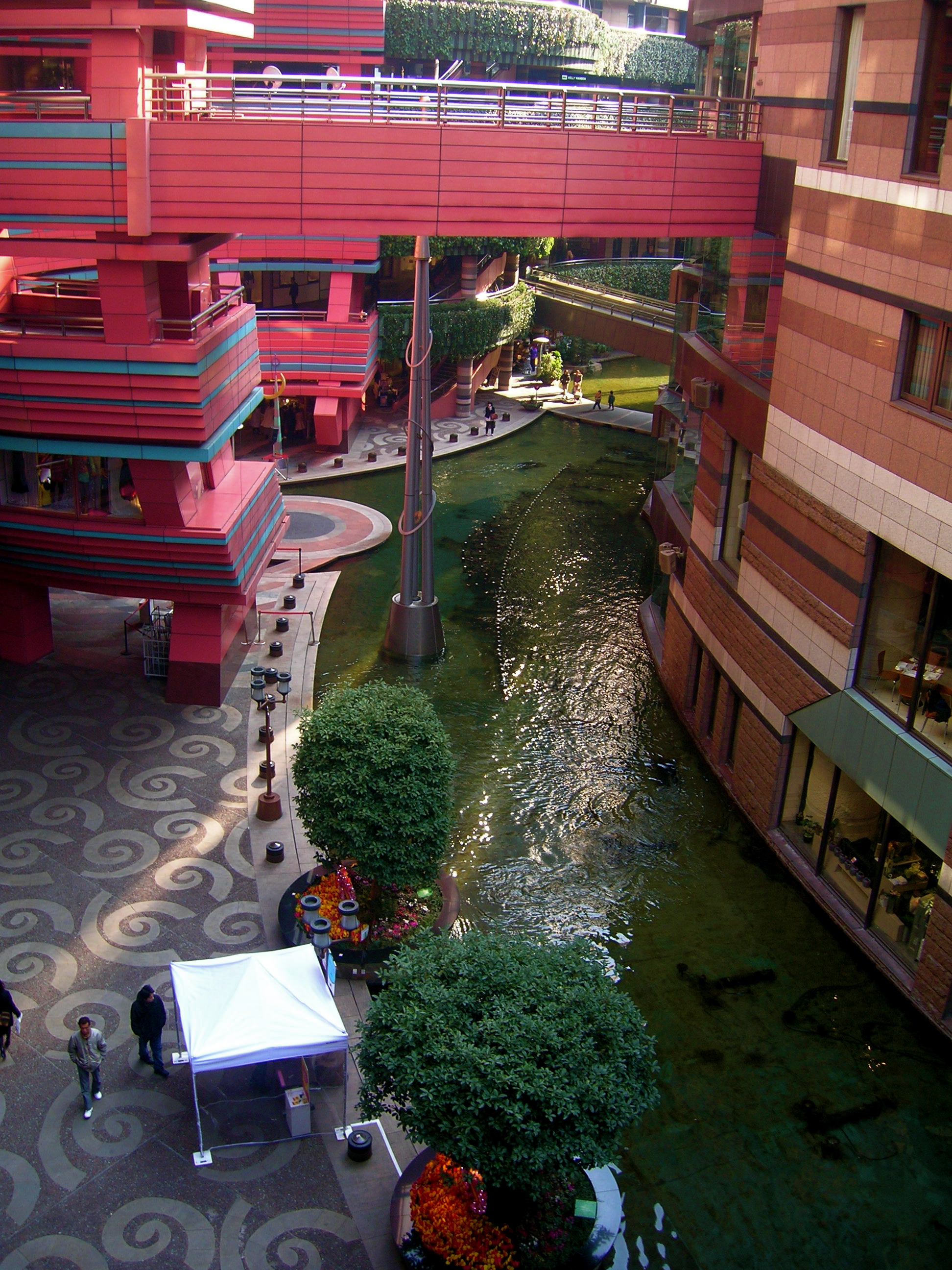
A narrow pool runs the length of Canal City

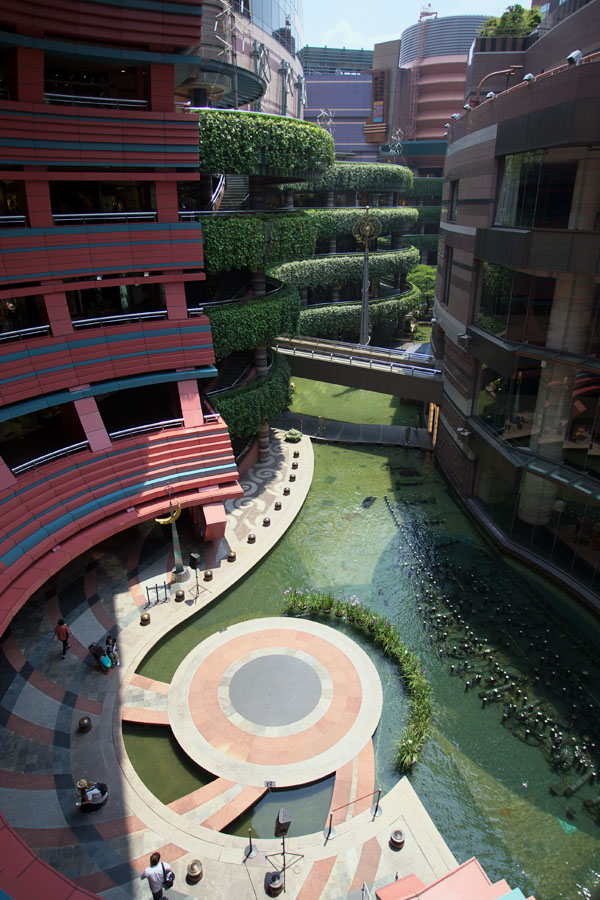
Canal City's pool and hedge balconies

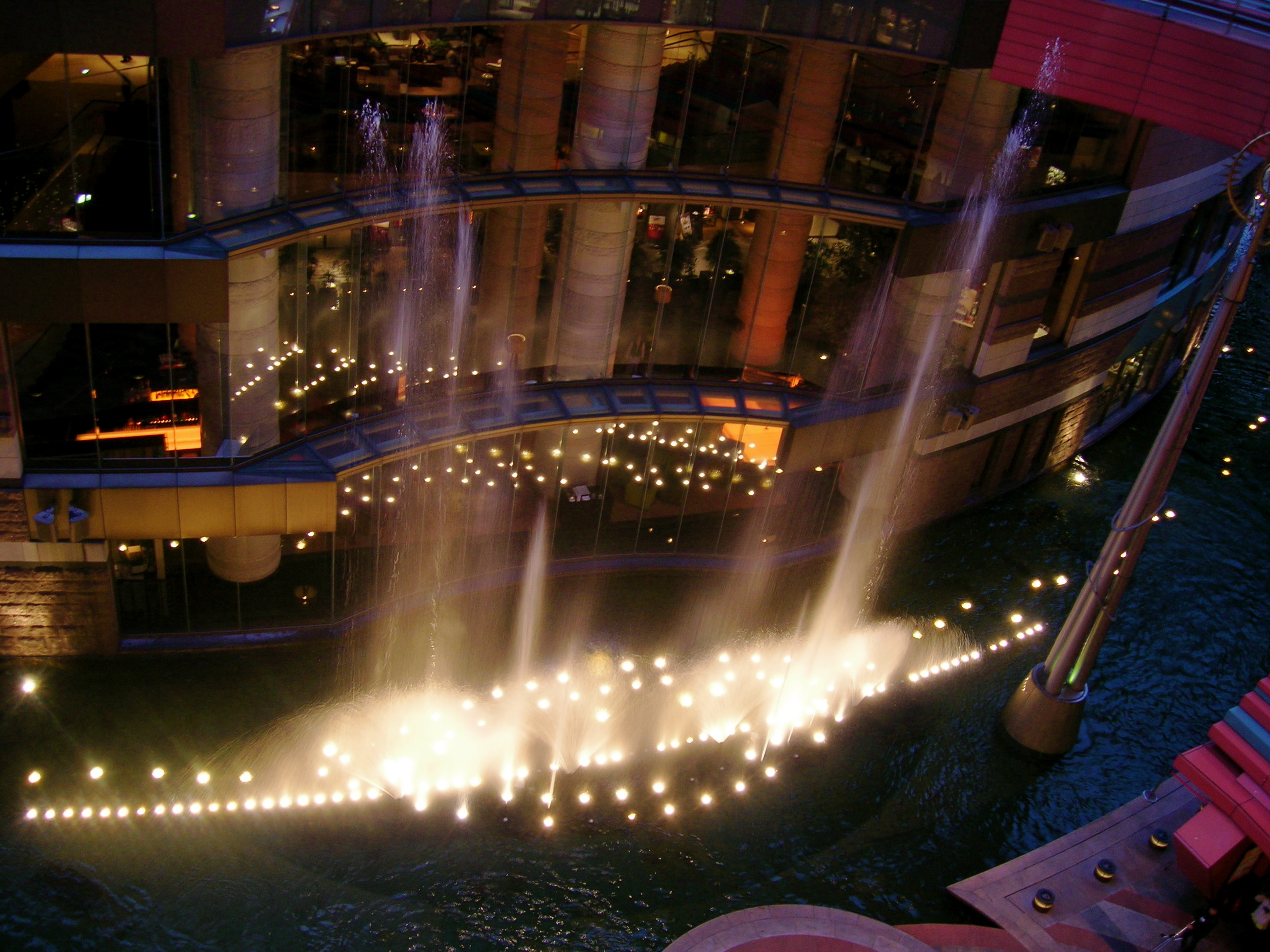
Fountains synchronized with music "dance" every hour

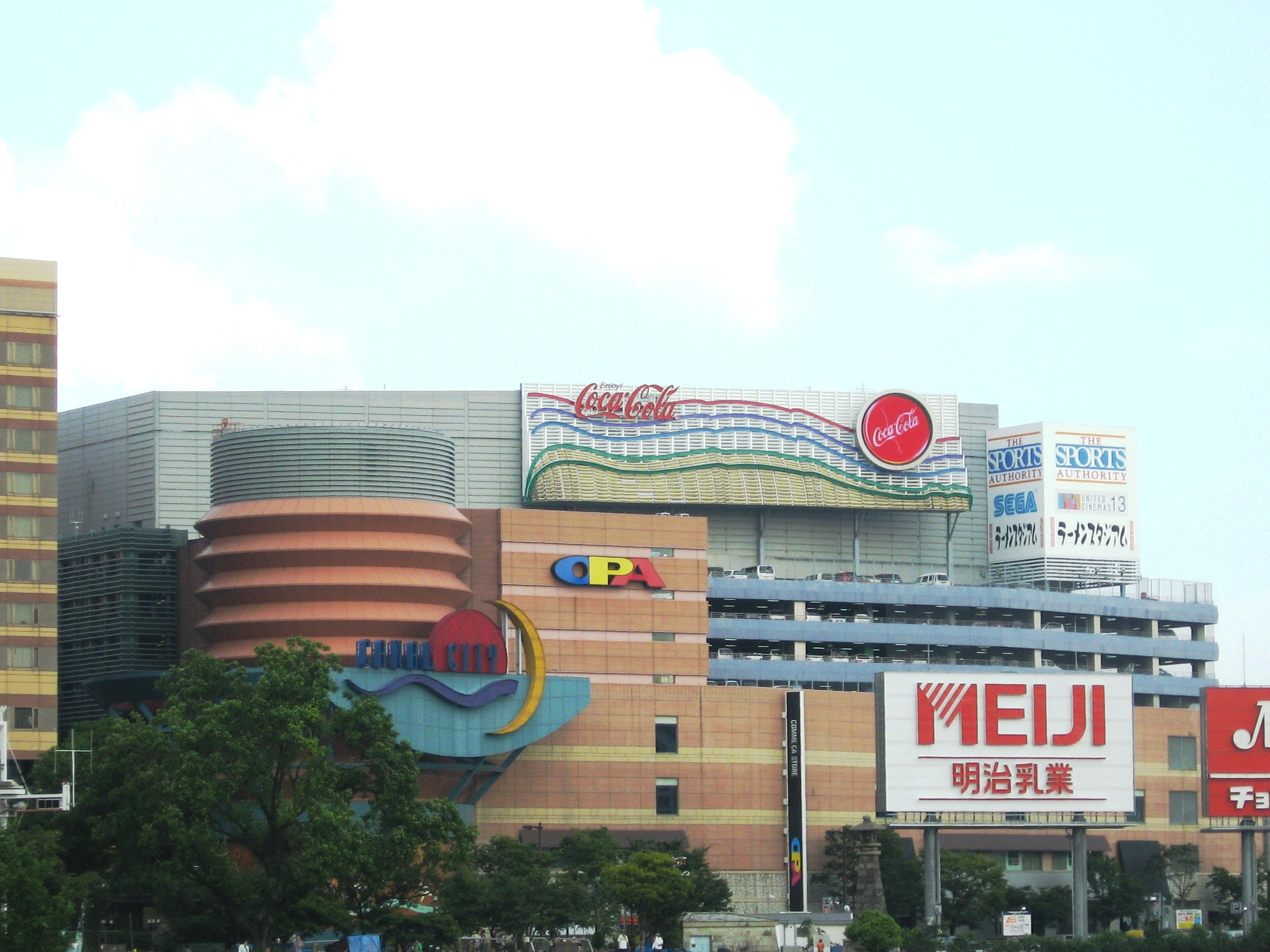
Canal City from the outside

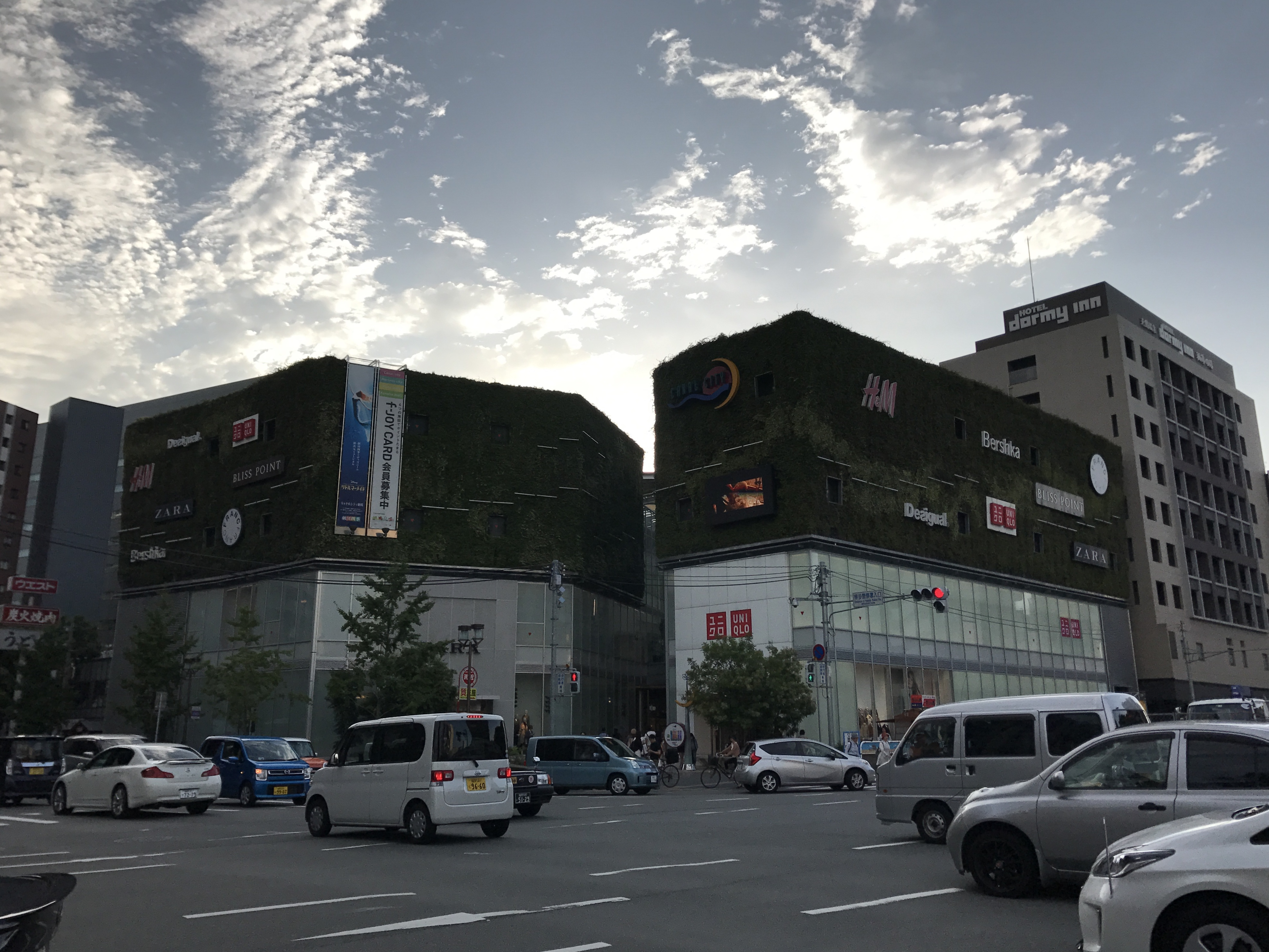
East Building

== See also ==
- Jerde-associated architectural projects in Japan:
- Namba Parks (Osaka)
- Riverwalk Kitakyushu
- Roppongi Hills (Tokyo)
