= Harsimus Stem Embankment =

Railroad embankment in New Jersey, US

Coordinates: 40.7252°N 74.0441°W

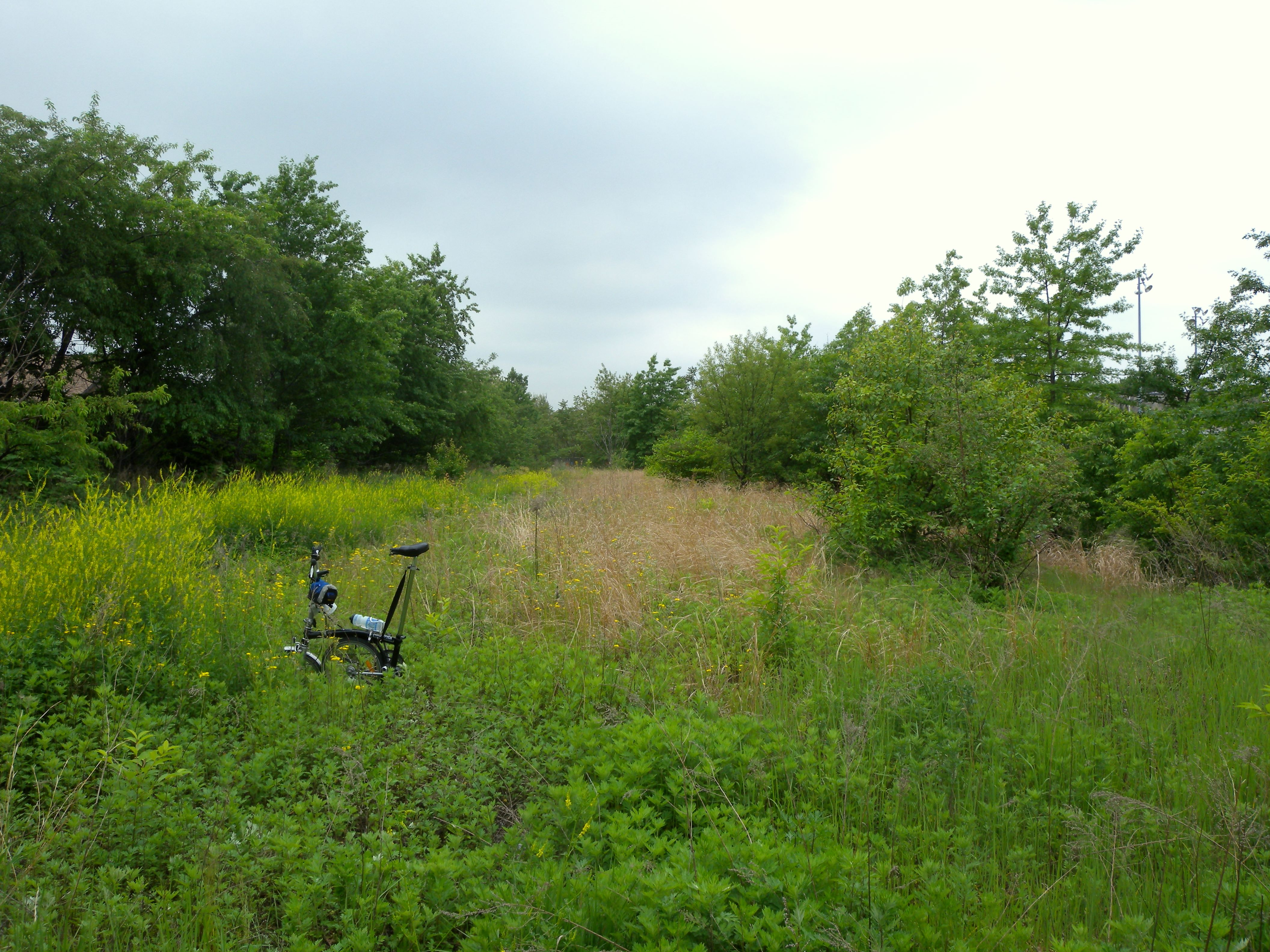
Atop embankment at eastern end

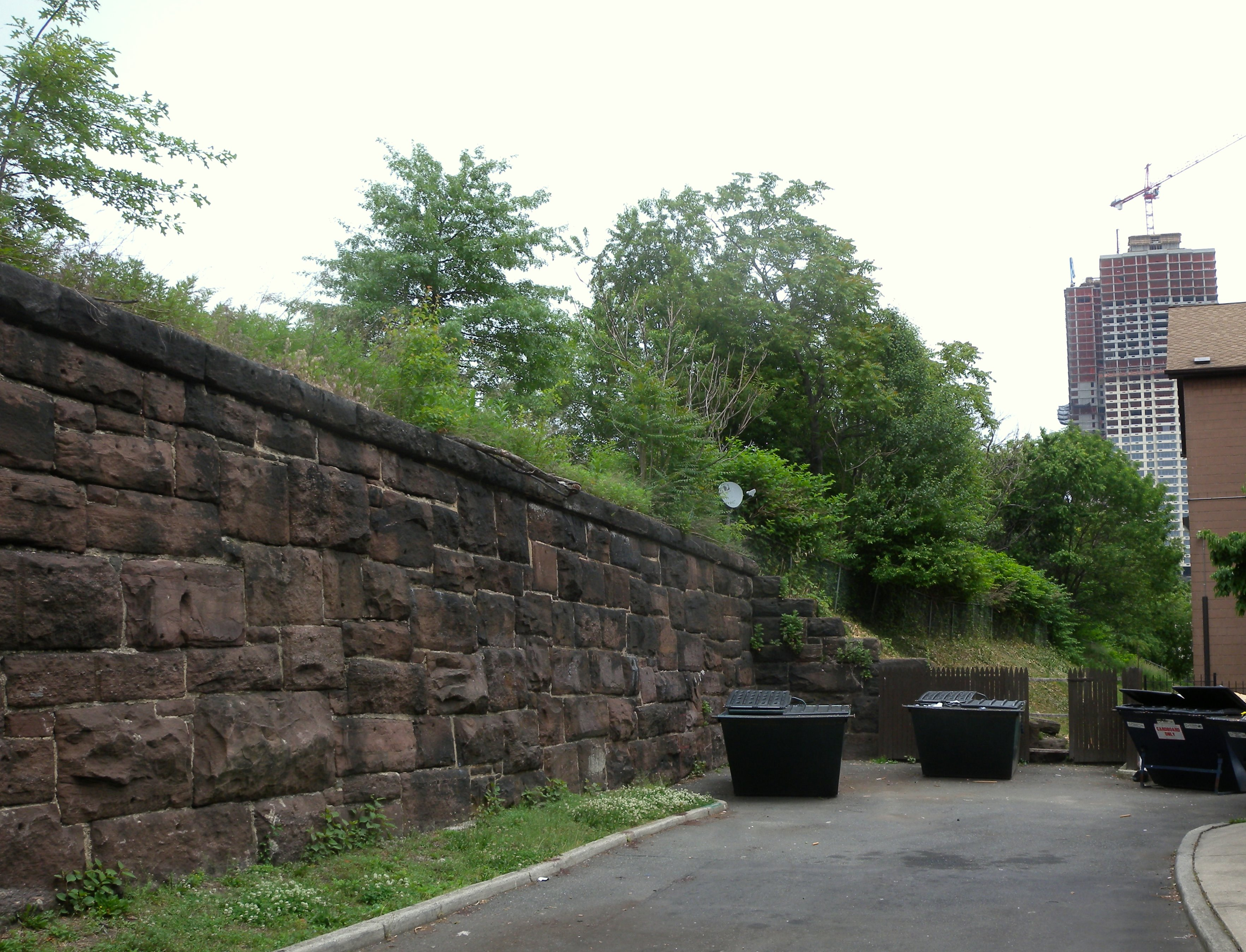
Retaining wall

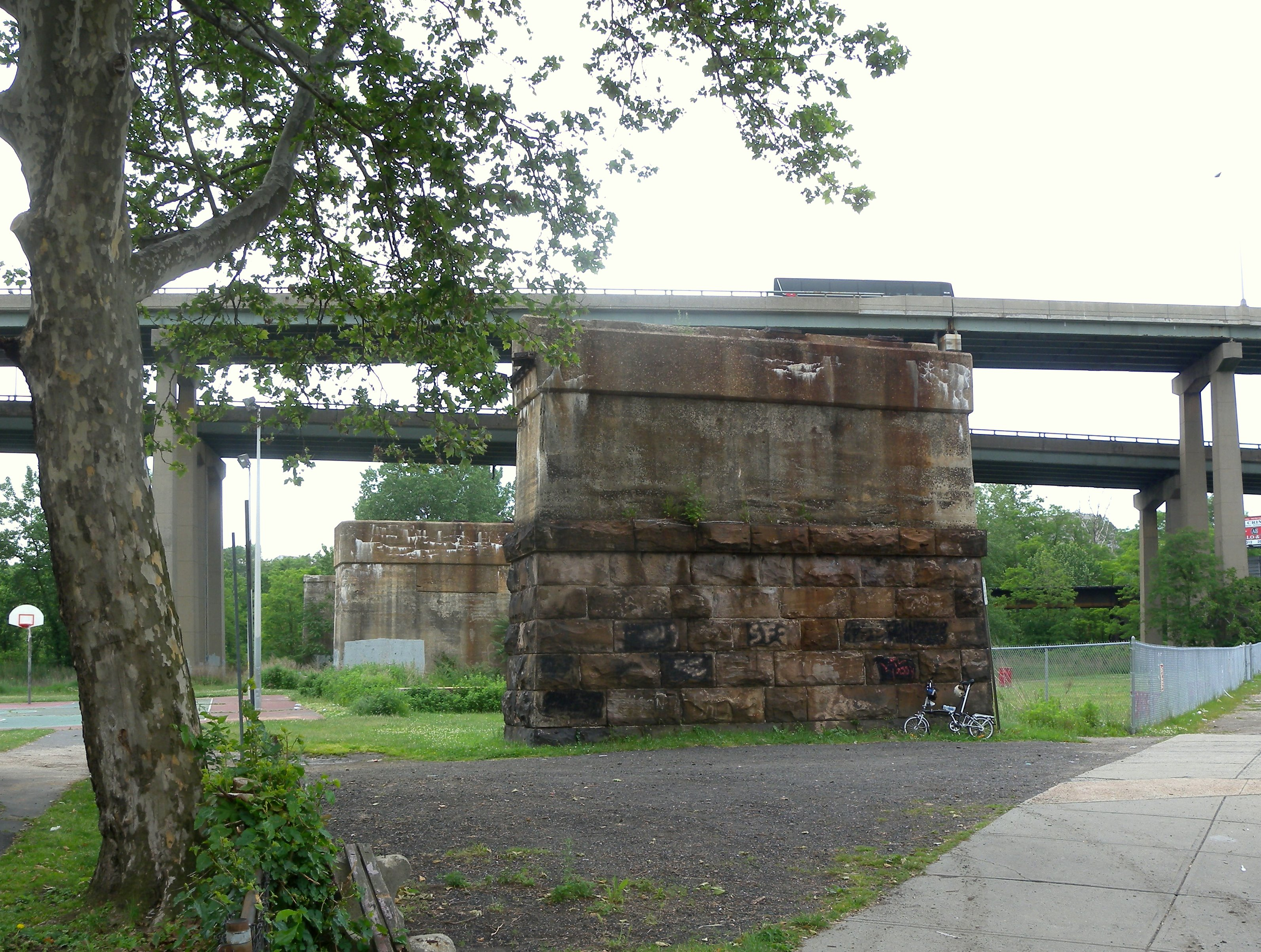
Stone support pier of viaduct which carried the line westward to what is now Journal Square

The Harsimus Stem Embankment, also called Sixth Street Embankment, is a half-mile-long historic railroad embankment, disused and largely overgrown with foliage, in the heart of the historic downtown of Jersey City, New Jersey in the United States. The 27-foot-high (8.2 m) embankment runs along the south side of Sixth Street west from Marin Boulevard to Brunswick Street. It is the border between the Harsimus and Hamilton Park neighborhoods. The overhead tracks of the beam bridge west of Brunswick Street were dismantled but the stone abutments remain.

This elevated stone structure was once owned and operated by Conrail and carried seven tracks of the Pennsylvania Railroad's Passaic and Harsimus Line to its freight yards and carfloat operations on the Hudson River at Harsimus Cove, and to its warehouse and distribution facility (now Harborside Financial Center). The line was part of the railroad's holdings on the waterfront, which included the Exchange Place passenger terminal and the Greenville Yard. The Embankment is listed on the New Jersey Register of Historic Places, is eligible for the National Register, and is a Jersey City municipal landmark.

== Legal disputes and redevelopment ==
In July 2005, Conrail sold the property to a collection of real estate developer LLCs, including Steve Hyman of the Albanese Organization, for $3 million. In January 2006, Jersey City requested a ruling from the Surface Transportation Board (STB) to determine the legality of the sale and whether Conrail had followed the proper abandonment procedure. The matter was resolved in September 2010, when a federal court ruled that the sale to the developer was legal and that the city had not previously exercised its first option to buy the right-of-way from Conrail. The decision meant the Embankment was not under the jurisdiction of STB and the City's pending eminent domain litigation in Hudson County's Superior Court could proceed.

In 2010, a local citizens' movement lobbied local governments, chiefly Hudson County and the City of Jersey City, to acquire the land and convert the embankment to a public park. The developer who owns the land where the embankment is located is opposed. That same year, a $1 million grant request from the City of Jersey City to purchase the embankment was denied. The developer's proposals to sell portions of the land to the city were rejected in 2011. The case was brought to an appeals court, which found that the case against the developer could proceed. In January 2012 it was announced that a deal had been arranged whereby the city would purchase the property for $7 million. In September 2012 it was ruled that Conrail had not gone through the required process of "abandonment" and was not legally able to sell the property.

An agreement in principle was announced with the Albanese Organization in 2020. As part of this agreement, two high-rises would be built on part of one block of the embankment, and the Jersey City government would take over the rest of the embankment and convert it to parkland. At the time, the city did not actually own the land but wanted to create a plan for the embankment so that the legal dispute could be resolved. The plans were downsized from 875 to 600 apartments in 2022 following opposition to the plans. The Jersey City City Council reviewed plans in late 2025 to approve financing to help support the redevelopment and park, and the agreement was approved that November.

== See also ==
- Bergen Arches
- Bergen Hill
- Bloomingdale Trail
- Greenway, London
- Harsimus
- High Line
- Jersey City Branch
- Lowline
- Maidashi ryokuchi
- Promenade plantée
- Rail trail
- Rails-to-Trails Conservancy (RTC)
- Reading Viaduct
