= Maidashi =

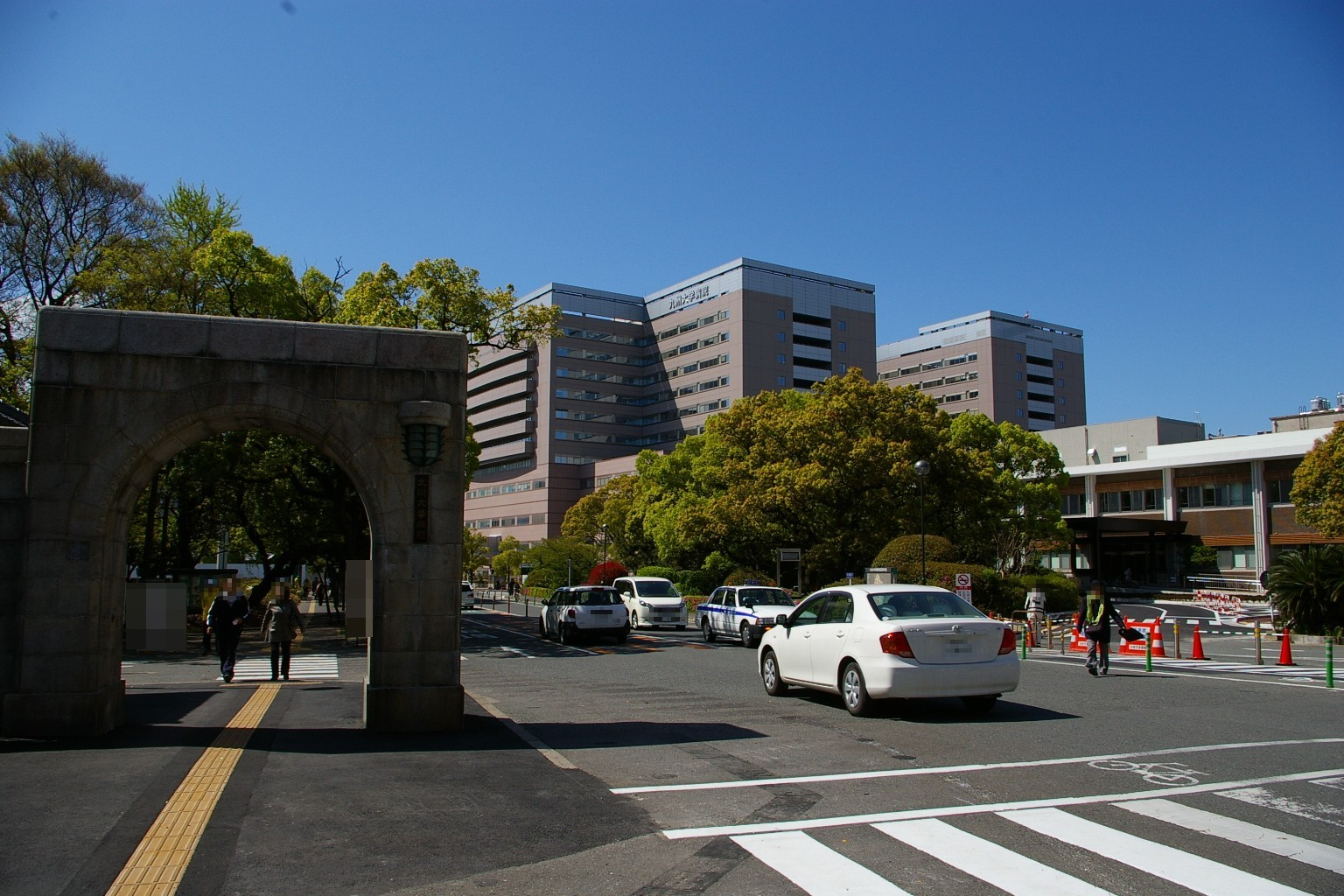
Kyushu University Hospital

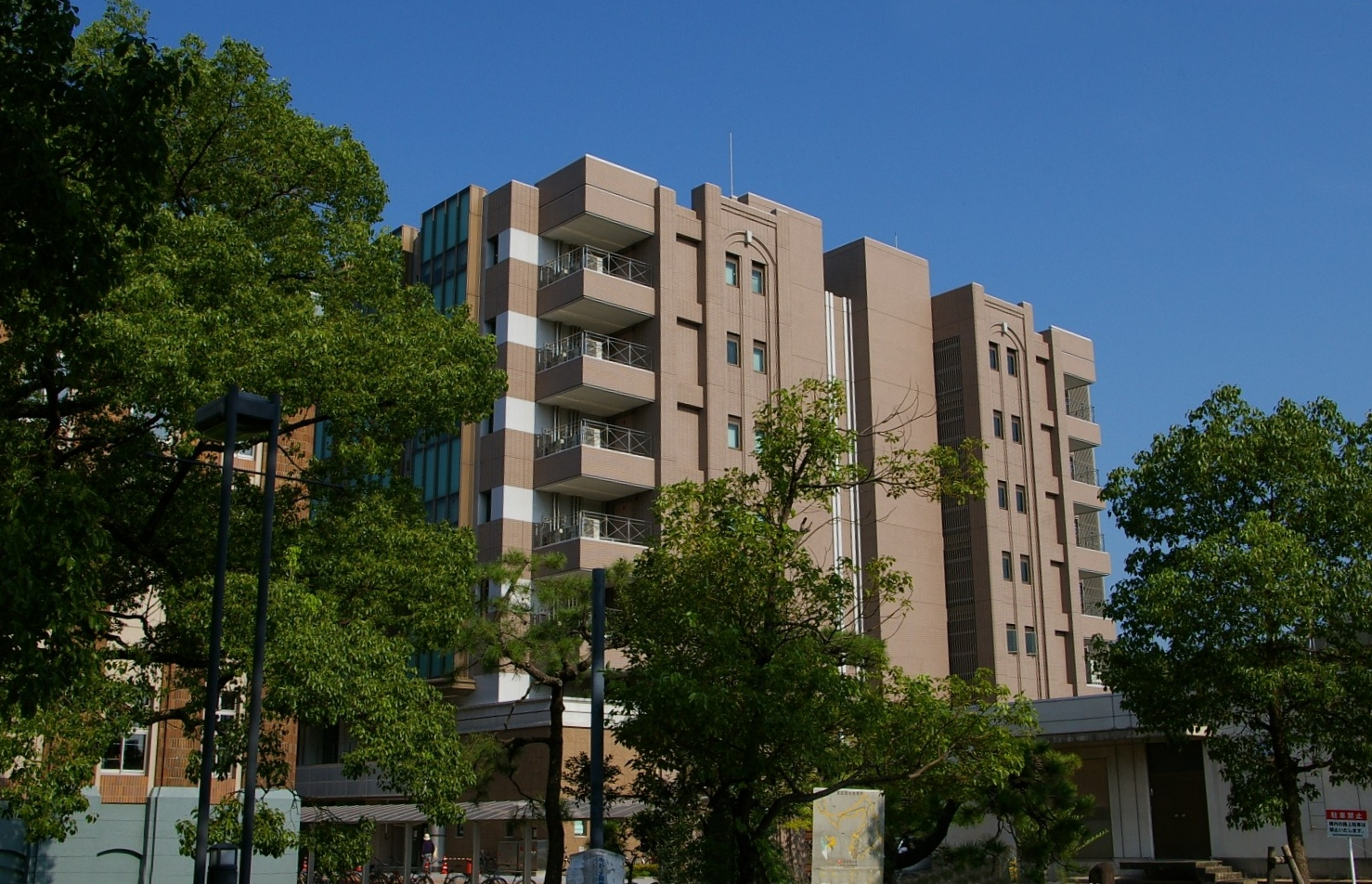
Kyushu University Station for Collective Research II

Maidashi (馬出) is a district of Higashi-ku, Fukuoka, in Fukuoka Prefecture, Japan. It is divided into six chōme, numbered 1 to 6, with a total population of 8,813 and 5,341 households (as of 31 August 2011). The postal code for addresses in Maidashi is 812–0054. The "Maidashi" school district includes parts of the Higashi Hama district.

== Geography ==
It is located to the west of Hakozaki Shrine.

== Etymology ==
Ma (馬) means horse and idashi (出) means offer in Japanese. It is said that the name of Maidashi derives from a historical event at which the town people provided horses for participants at a festival in Hakozaki-gu. The name has been used since the end of Heian Period. Formally it belonged in Naka gun (那珂郡)(in Chikuzen koku (筑前国), it was written as Umayade (馬屋出).

== History ==
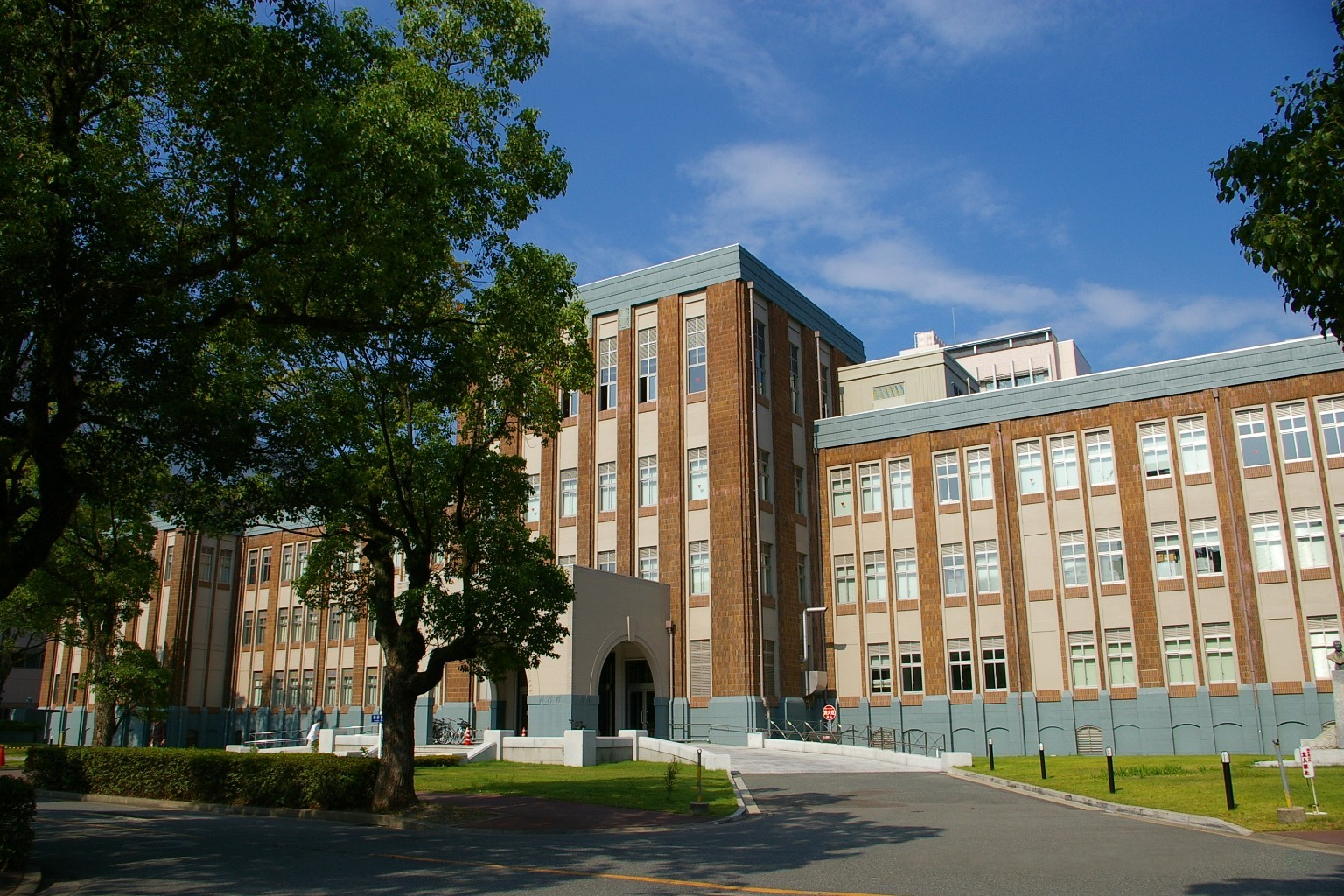
Former the Building of Department of Medicine Kyushu Imperial University （Present the Faculty of Medicine Bldg. A of Basic Science of Kyushu University）

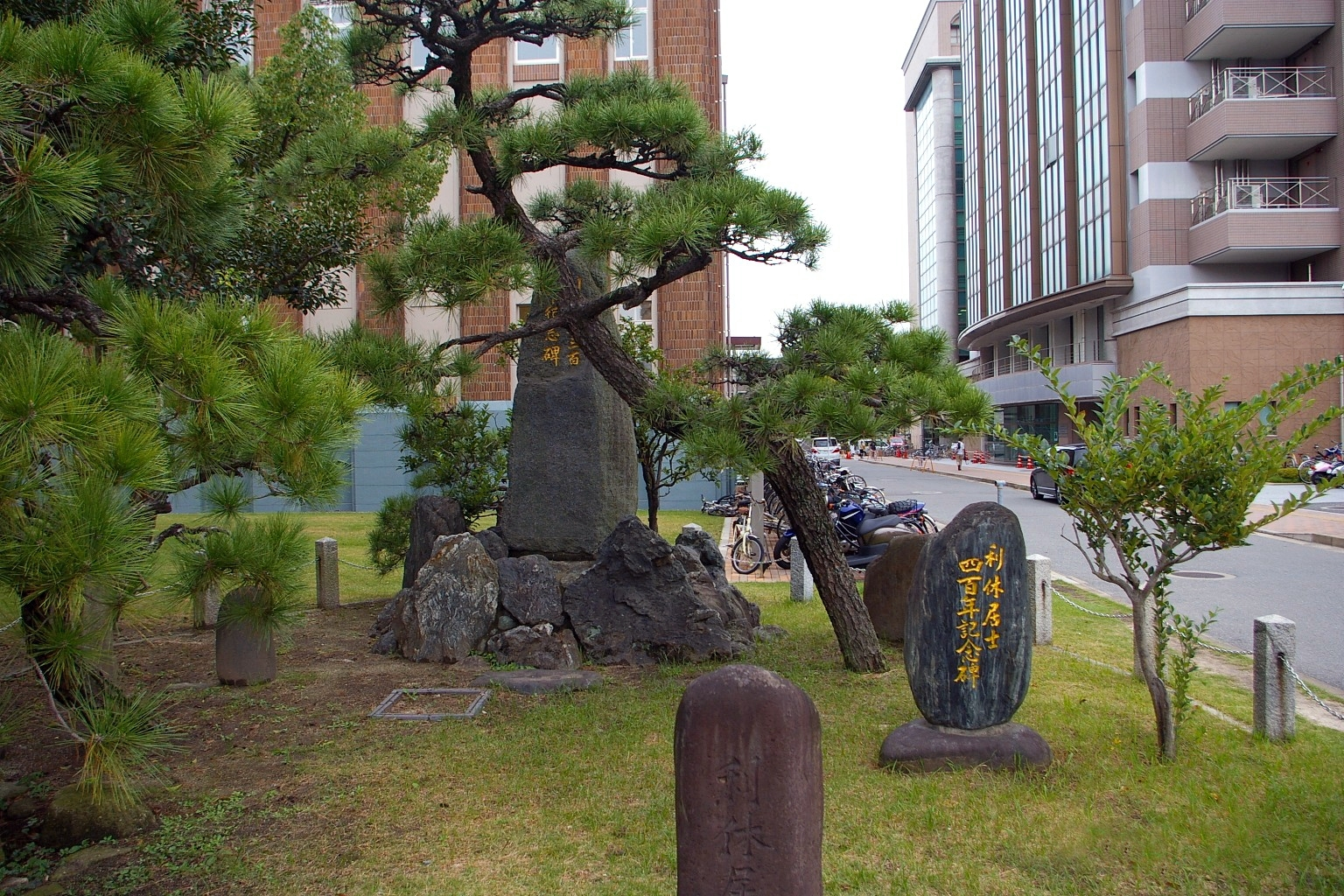
Rikyu kama kake matsu

In the Kamakura Period, when the Mongols attempted to invade Japan, Hakata suffered a surprise attack, which led the Kamakura bakuhu, Japan's feudal government, to create a bulwark against the Mongolian invaders.

At the end of the Sengoku period, after Kyūshū Campaign, Toyotomi Hideyoshi settled by the sea shore, and ordered Sen no Rikyū to hold a tea party. The pine tree where Rikyu boiled kettle for the tea ceremony still exists in the Kyushu University Medical campus. During the Edo period, there were many domestic expenditures which made Mage-mono (曲物) and roofing panel and Sanpo, ritual article, to be ordered out by Hakozaki-gu.

In 1903, the Fukuoka Ika daigaku (福岡医科大学, Fukuoka medical school) was established. It was originally the Fukuoka kenritsu Fukuoka byoin (福岡県立福岡病院, the Fukuoka prefectural hospital), which was derived from Sansei kan (賛生館), Fukuoka clan school. In 1911, the Kyushu Imperial University medical school was established.

== Education and child care ==
There are several educational establishments: Kyushu University (National Seven Universities) Medical school, dental college, department of pharmacy, and Hakata joshi junior high school and high school (博多女子中学校・高等学校), Fukuoka municipal junior high school (福岡市立福岡中学校) and Maidashi elementary school.

In addition, there are top level institutes of Japan such as Kyushu University Medical Institute of Bioregulation, Kyushu University Research Center for Prevention of Infections Diseases, and Kyushu University Research Center for Genetic Information.

In Maidashi the number of children has been increasing since 1990. There are many child-care facilities, such as Suginoko hoiku-en (杉の子保育園), Himawari hoiku-en (ひまわり保育園), and parent and toddler groups such as Merry-go-land (メリーゴーランド) (in Maidashi Kaikan), Donguri-rando (どんぐりランド), and San san salon (SUNさんサロン).

== City ==
There is a shopping mall called Yume taun Hakata (ゆめタウン博多, which means 'Hakata Dream Town' in Japanese), which attracts many people from surrounding areas during holidays. There is an international school in Maidashi.

=== Garden city ===
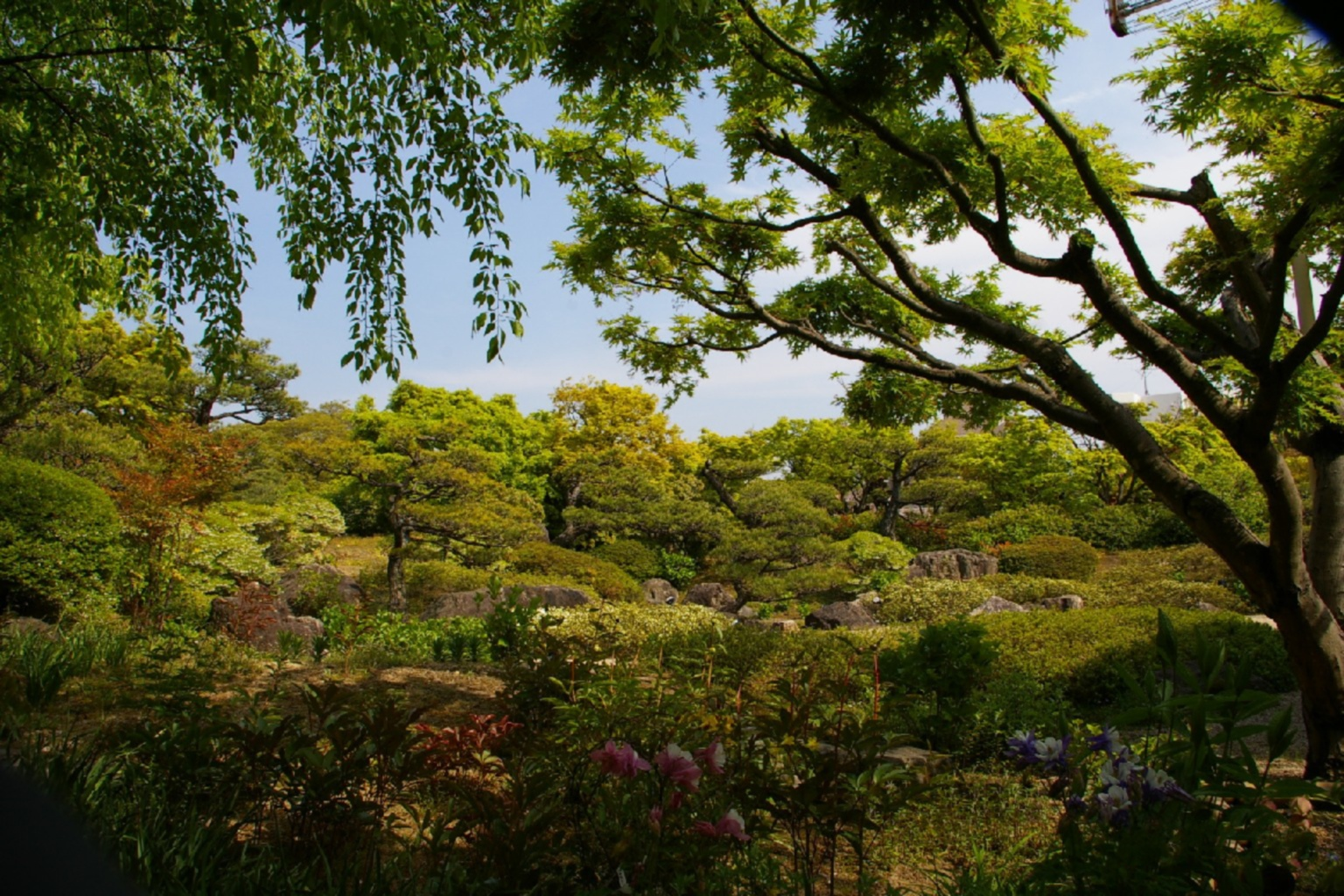
Hakozaki-gu Hana teien

There are many gardens, such as Azuma Koen, Maidashi ryokuchi, Kyushu University campus, Hakozaki-gu hana teien (筥崎宮花庭園, Hakozaki shrine flower garden), etc. The maidachi area is famous for being a garden city. Fukuoka city has a high number of parks for Japan, especially the Midashi area with low population density and educational facility and research establishment cover a much larger area. Maidashi ryokuchi is not only a park but also a historic site which gives the citizens opportunities to learn the modern history of Hukuoka since the Meiji era.

Parks:

- Maidashi ryokuchi
- Hakozaki-gu hana teien

=== Waterfront ===
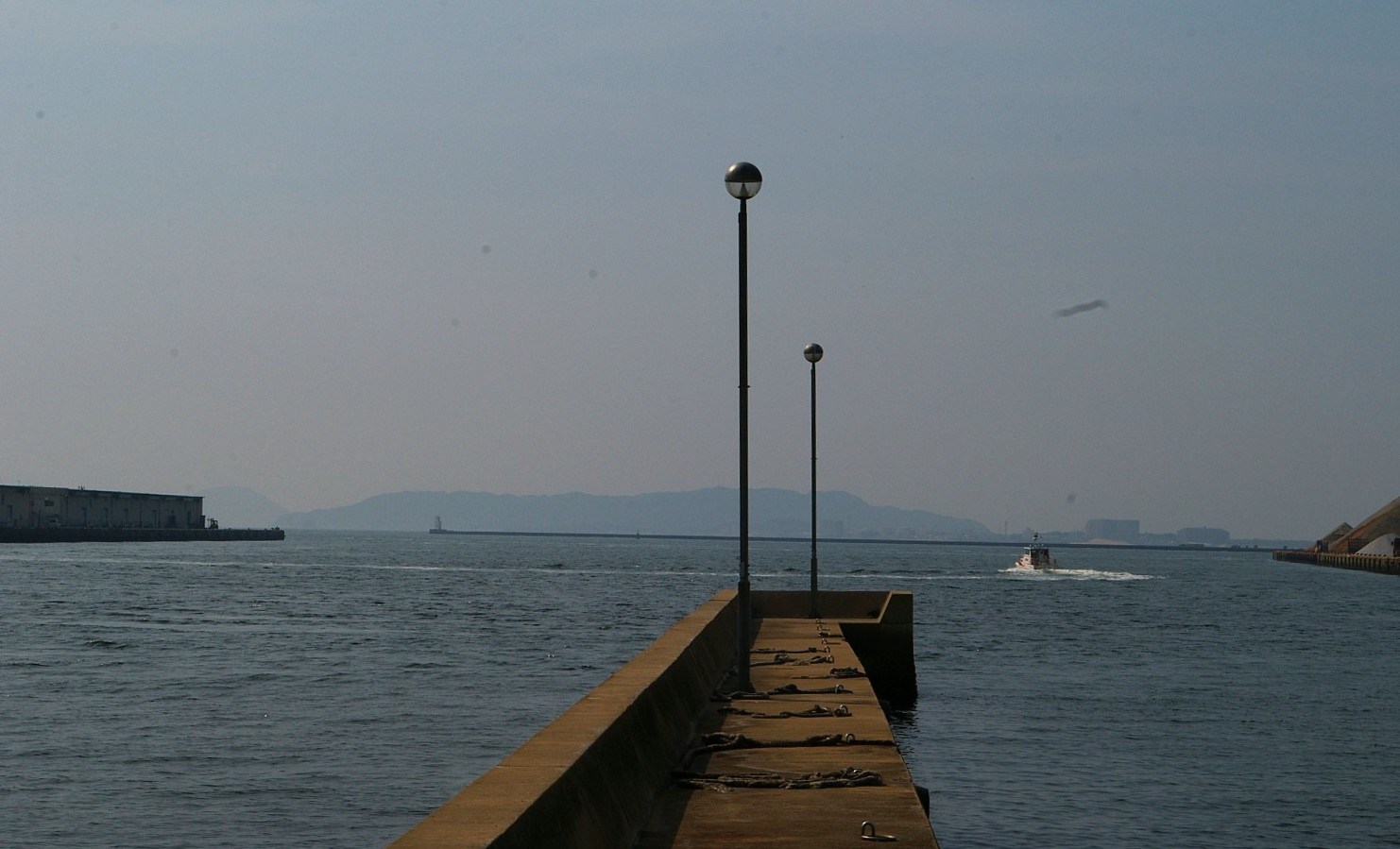
The Hakata bay viewed from Higashi-hama

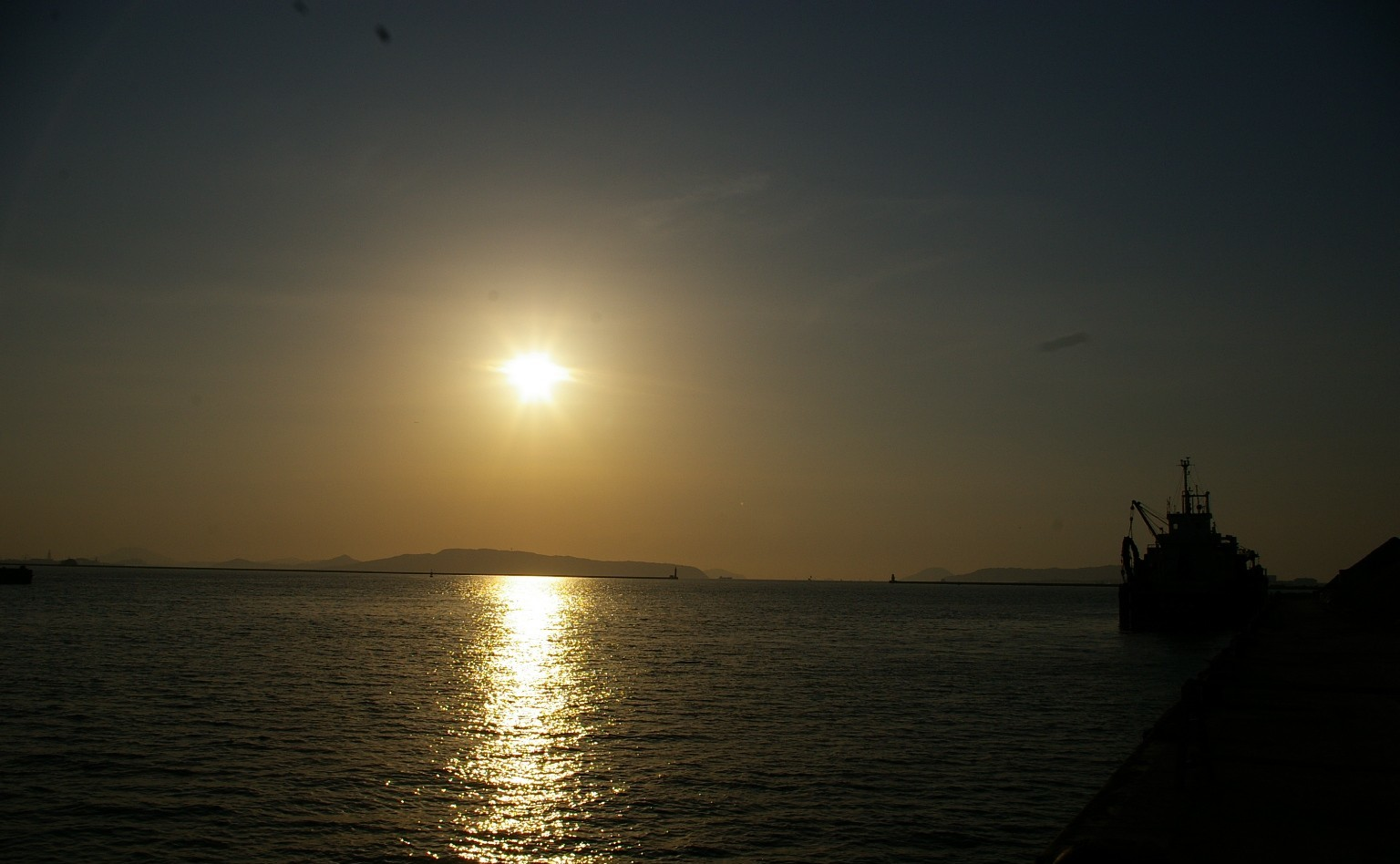
The Hakata bay at set of sun

Formally the coast line retreated at the point of the Kyushu University Maidashi campus today, where there was a place of scenic beauty with white sands and pine groves called Shirahama aomatsu (白砂青松, the pine trees with beautiful scenery of the seashore). But later a landfill site was created and now views of the sea are left only around the Osiroi hama (お潮井浜) of Hakozaki shrine, and an extensive prospect of Hakata Bay. Nowadays, as a view of the sea is to be a selling point, some high-rise condominiums, targeted for high-income class, have been constructed.

=== Medical and welfare facilities ===
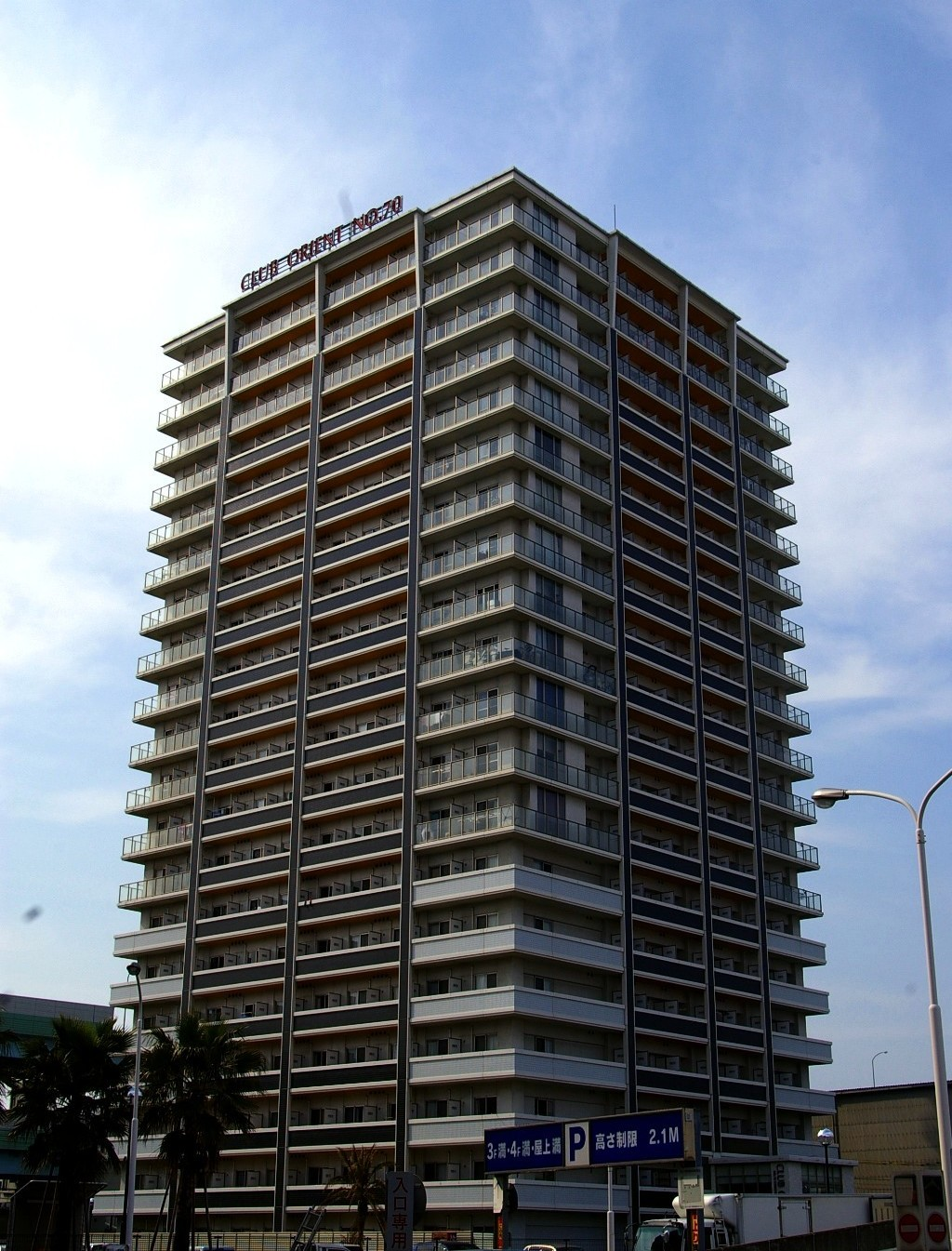
Club Orient No.70 Harbor South Tower2

In the Maidashi area there are twelve medical organizations, and per capita number of doctors, nurses, and beds is well above the national average.

== Transportation ==
=== Rail ===
- Maidashi-Kyūdai-byōin-mae Station (Fukuoka City Subway Hakozaki Line)

=== Road ===
- Japan National Route 3
