= Coulée verte René-Dumont =

Elevated promenade in Paris

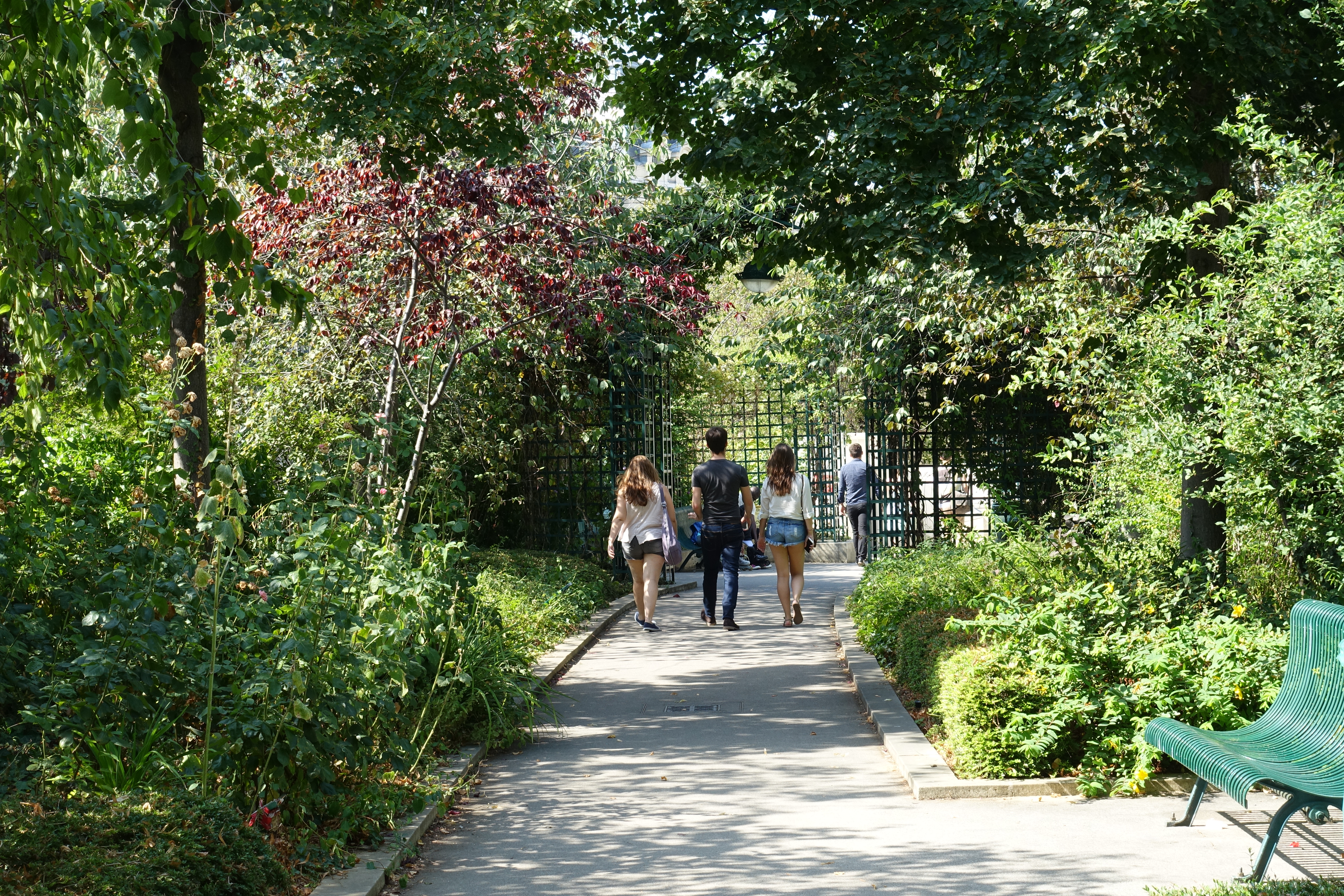
- View of the Coulée verte René-Dumont

- Location within Paris
- Type: Elevated, linear park and rail trail
- Nearest city: Paris
- Coordinates: 48°50′58″N 2°22′18″E
- Created: 1993; 33 years ago
- Operator: Paris municipality
- Website: www.paris.fr/lieux/coulee-verte-rene-dumont-1772

The Coulée verte René-Dumont or Promenade plantée René-Dumont is a 4.7 km (2.9 mi) elevated linear park built on top of obsolete railway infrastructure in the 12th arrondissement of Paris, France. It was inaugurated in 1993.

== Etymology ==
Promenade plantée means "planted walkway". Coulée verte traslates to "green corridor". The park memorializes René Dumont, a French engineer and environmentalist.

== Description ==
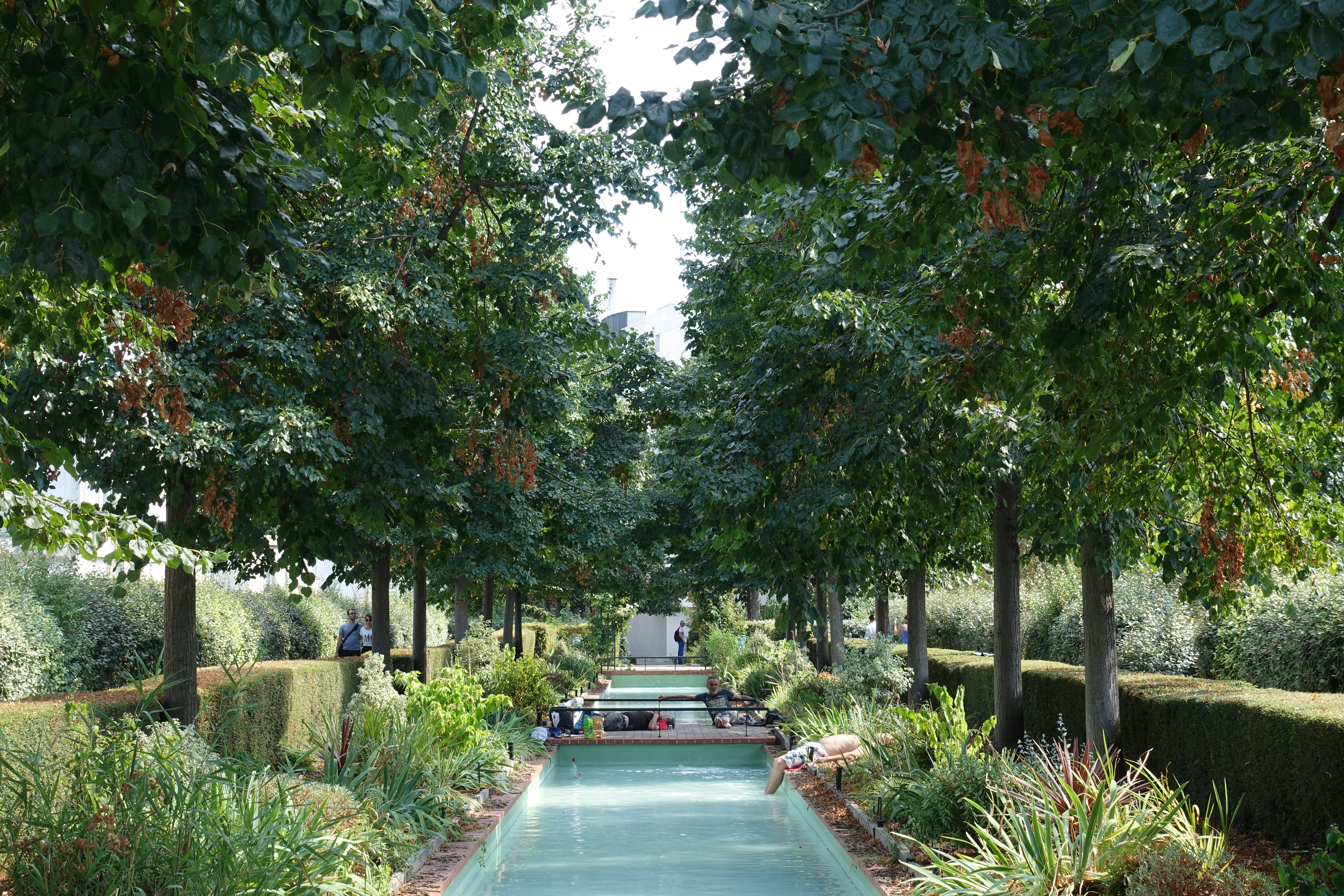
A view of the Coulée verte in summer

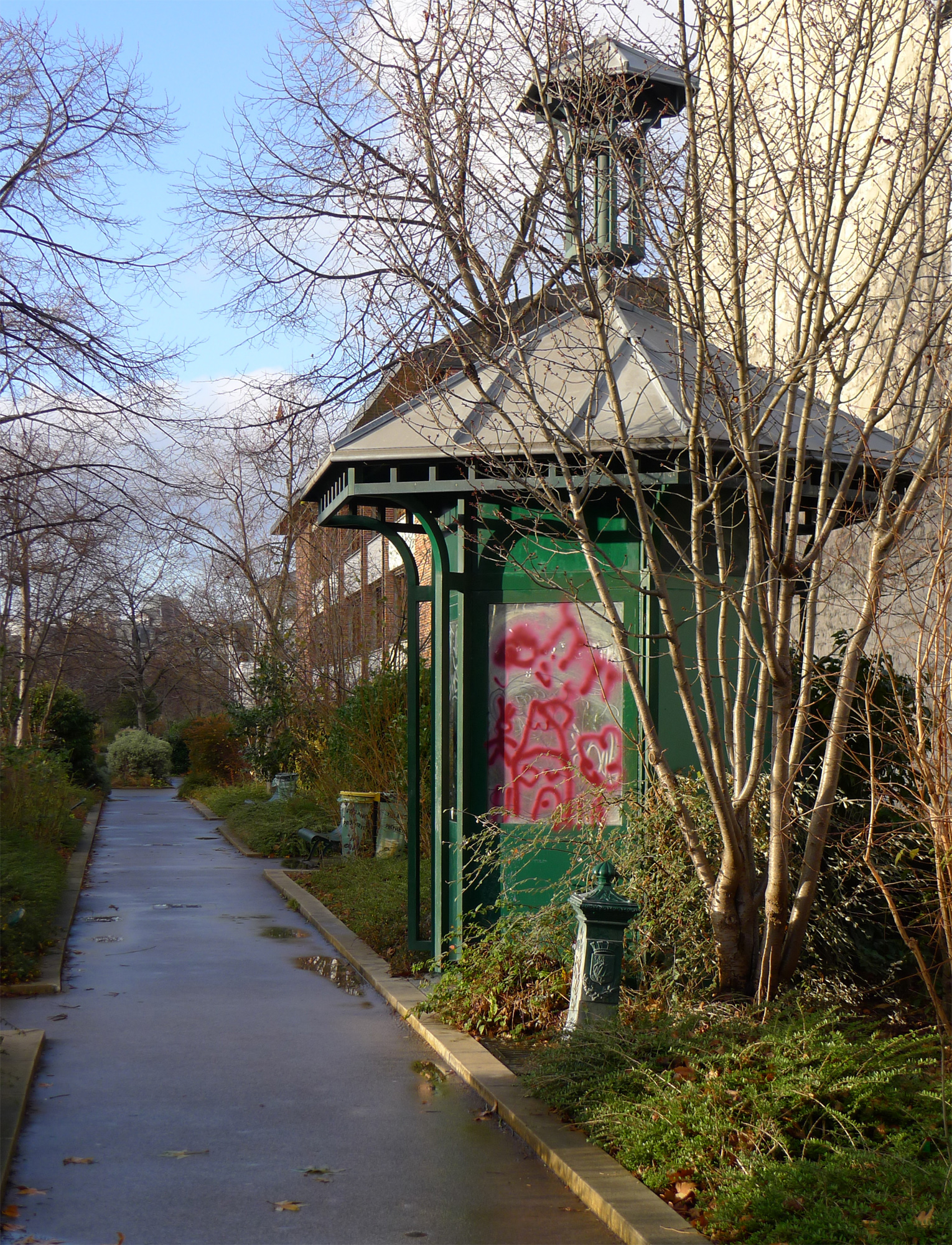
Another view of the Coulée verte.

This Promenade plantée in Paris is an extensive green belt that follows the old Vincennes railway line. Beginning just east of the Opéra Bastille with the elevated Viaduc des Arts, it follows a 4.7-kilometre (2.9 mi) path eastward that ends at a spiral staircase leading to the boulevard Périphérique beltway. At its west end near the Bastille, the parkway rises 10 metres (33 ft) above the surrounding area and forms the Viaduc des Arts, over a line of shops featuring the work of specialized craftsmen. The shops are located in the arches of the former elevated railway viaduct, with the parkway being supported atop the viaduct. This portion of the parkway runs parallel to the Avenue Daumesnil. The parkway crosses the Jardin de Reuilly near the Rue Montgallet and descends to street level. At that point, it becomes a grassy mall and then follows the old railway direction below street level towards the east, passing through several tunnels. As it reaches the Rue du Sahel, it splits, with one portion continuing to the beltway, and the other terminating in the Square Charles-Péguy along the former path of a branch line that once linked to the Petite Ceinture railway.

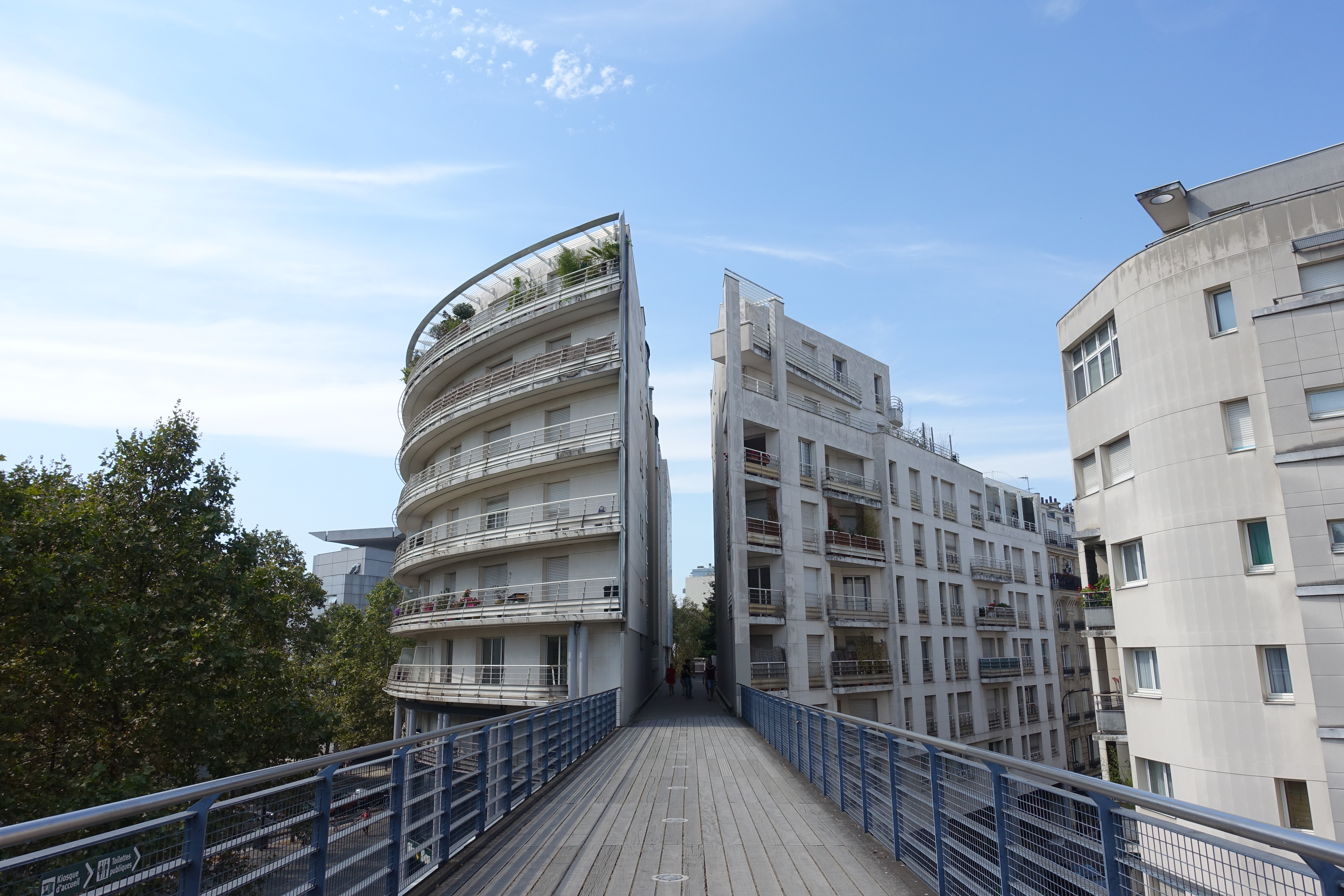
The Coulée verte passes between two buildings at rue Montgallet.

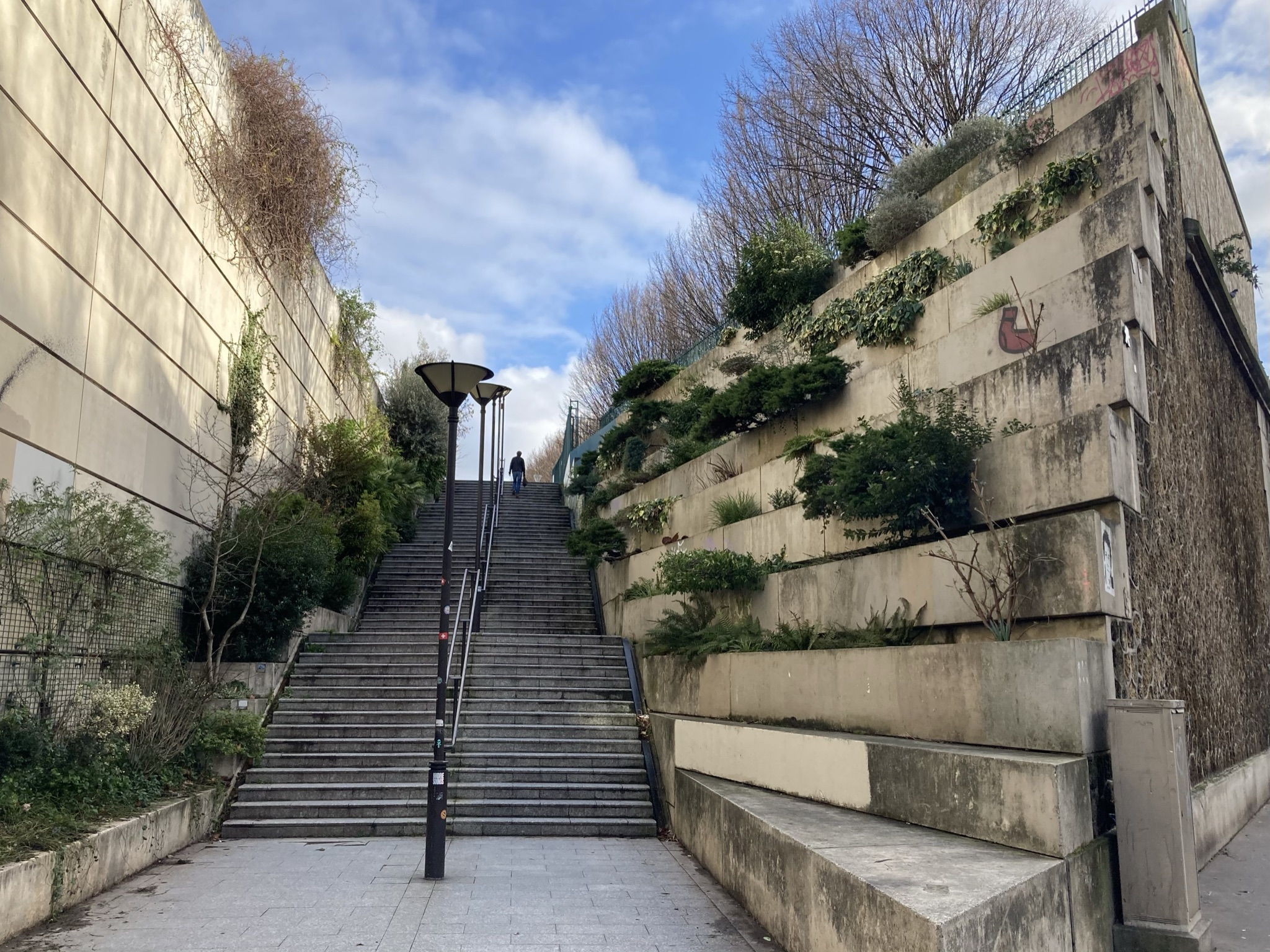
A stairway leading up to the Coulée verte from the bottom of rue Montgallet

The elevated part of the route, on the viaduct, has some enclosed sections, as when it passes between modern buildings, and some open sections with expansive views. In addition to the Jardin de Reuilly and the square Charles-Péguy, the Promenade plantée also includes the Jardin de la Gare-de-Reuilly, with its preserved but repurposed railway station, and the Square Hector-Malot. The western portion of the parkway may be accessed via stairways and elevators leading up to the elevated viaduct. This portion is reserved for pedestrians. The eastern portion of the parkway is accessible via ramps and stairways and is open to both pedestrians and cyclists. The west end can be reached from Bastille by walking 300 metres (980 ft) south on Rue de Lyon, then left on Avenue Daumesnil. The staircase entrance is immediately on the left where Avenue Daumesnil enters Rue de Lyon.

== History ==
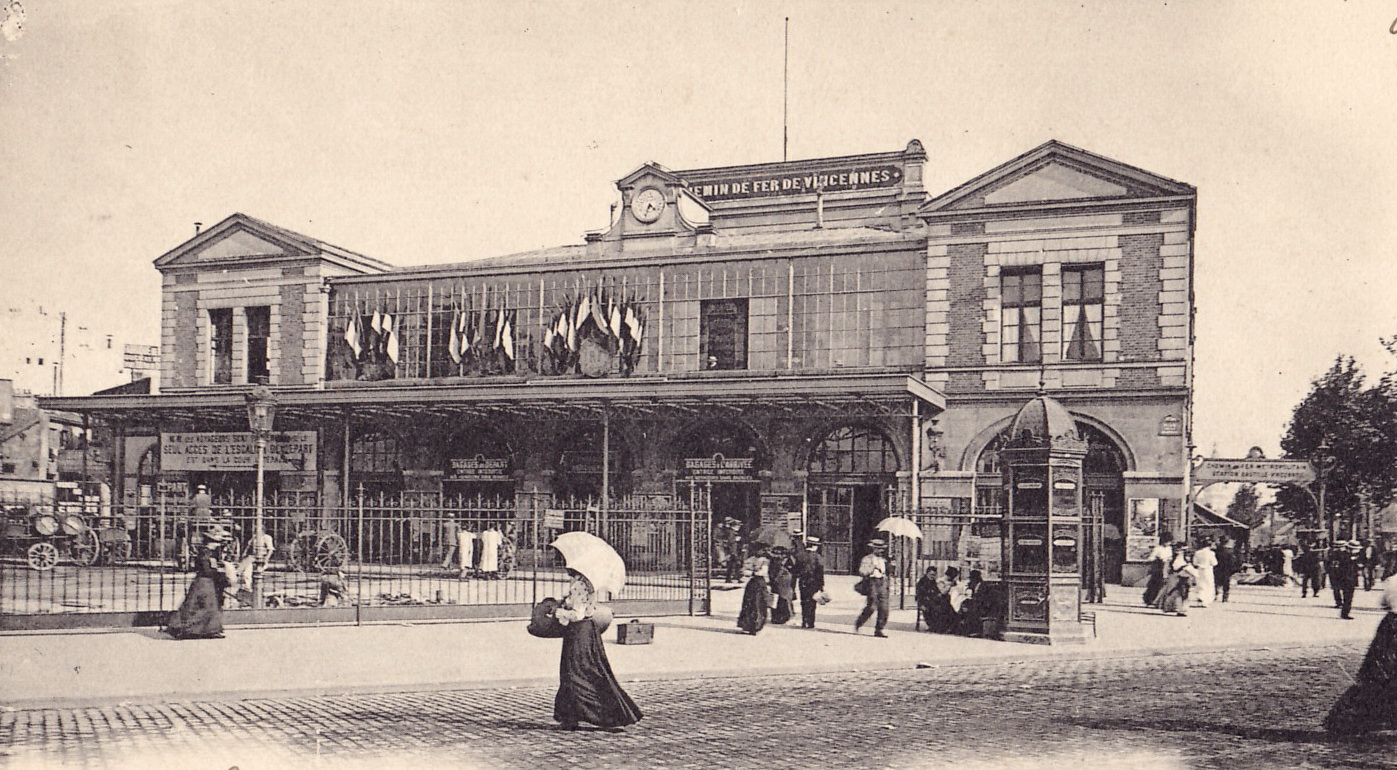
The Gare de Vincennes at Place de la Bastille, the starting point of the original train line

This Promenade Plantée is built on the former tracks of the Vincennes railway line, which, beginning in 1859, linked the Gare de la Bastille train station to Verneuil-l'Étang, after passing through Vincennes. It ceased operation on December 14, 1969; part of the line beyond Vincennes was integrated into Line A of the RER, while the Paris-Vincennes section was completely abandoned.

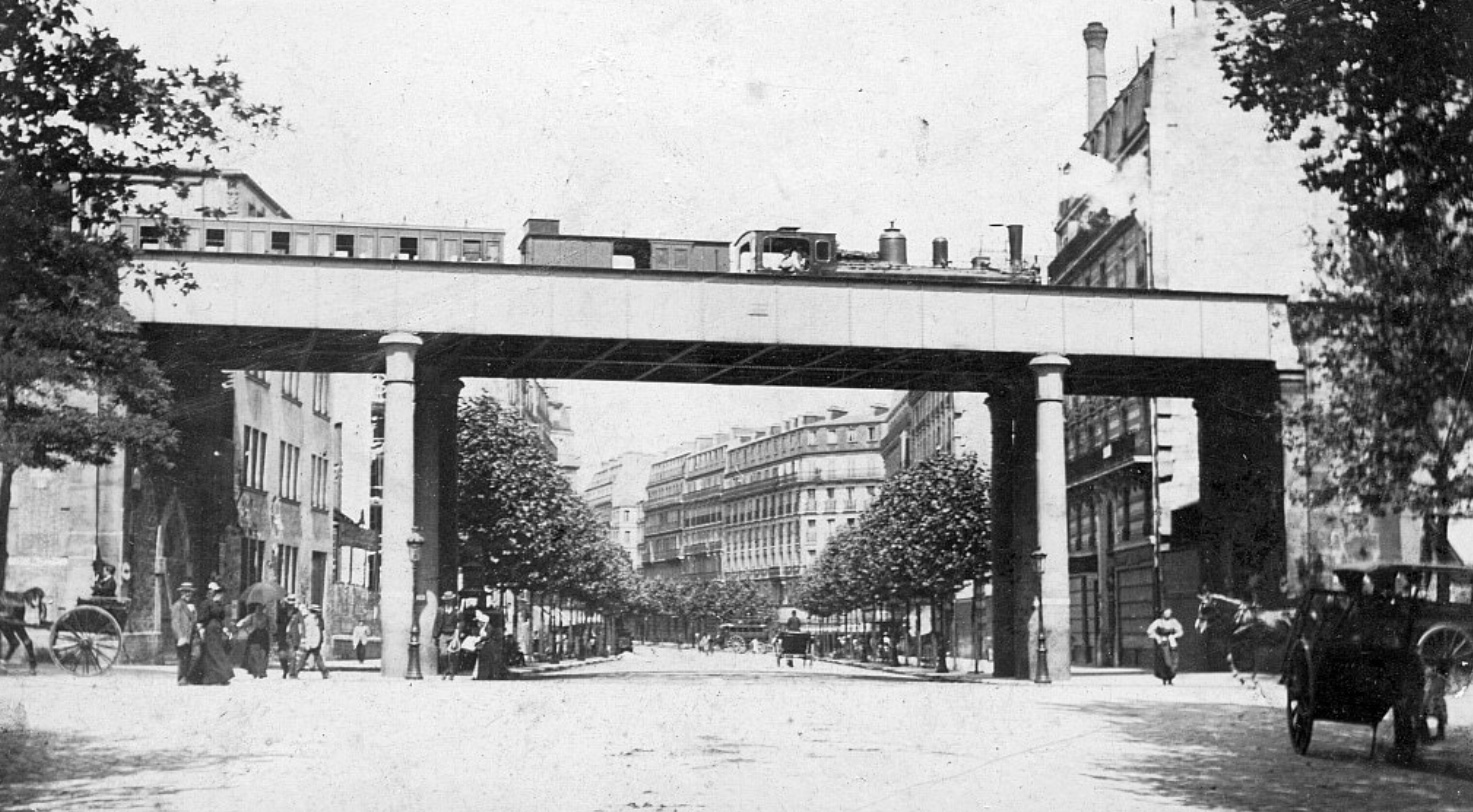
Train on a bridge over avenue Ledru Rollin, late 19th century

Beginning in the 1980s, the area was renovated. In 1984, the Bastille station was demolished to make way for the Opéra Bastille. The Reuilly section was designed in 1986; it incorporates the old commercial rail depot of Reuilly into a group of park areas. The Promenade Plantée was put into place at the same time in order to reuse the rest of the abandoned line between the Bastille and the old Montempoivre gate to the city. Landscape architect Jacques Vergely and architect Philippe Mathieux designed the parkway, which was inaugurated in 1993. The arcades of the Viaduc des Arts were renovated in 1989 by architect Patrick Berger, as was the new Square Charles-Péguy.

Paris' promenade was the first project in the world to repurpose elevated old railway lines into urban gardens. Other repurposing projects have now been completed or are underway. The first phase of the High Line, a similar park on an old railway viaduct in the West Side of Manhattan in New York City, was completed in 2009. The second phase was completed in 2011, bringing the total length of the High Line to 1.6 kilometres (1 mi); the third phase opened in September 2014, completing the park. In 2015 Chicago opened the nearly 4.8-kilometre (3.0 mi) Bloomingdale Trail, which runs through several city neighborhoods and allows bicycles.

== In popular culture ==
The Promenade Plantée appears in the film Before Sunset, directed by Richard Linklater in 2004 with Ethan Hawke and Julie Delpy. It is also mentioned in the science fiction novel Olympos, by Dan Simmons.

== Gallery ==
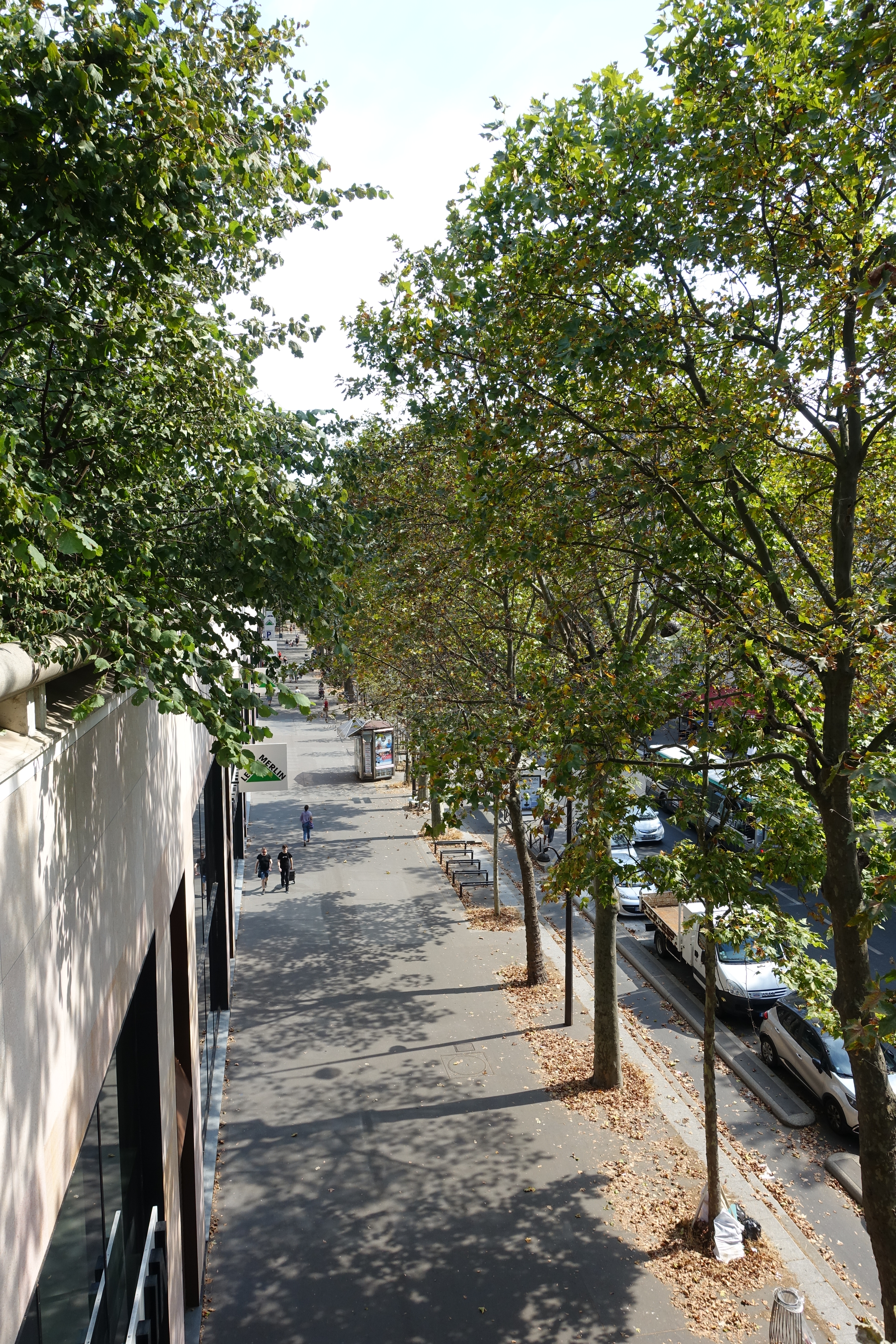
View onto Avenue Daumesnil

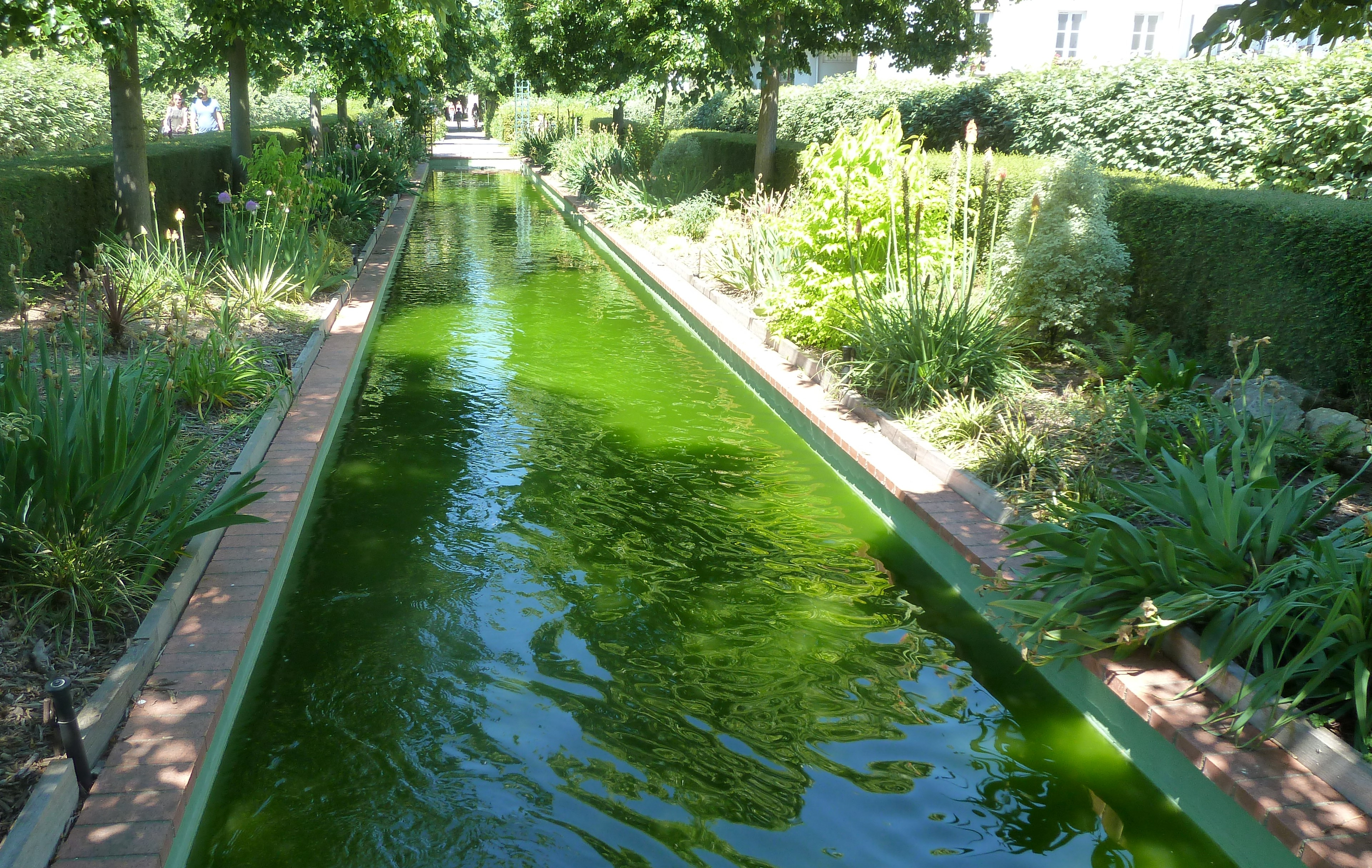
A reflecting pool on the Coulée verte

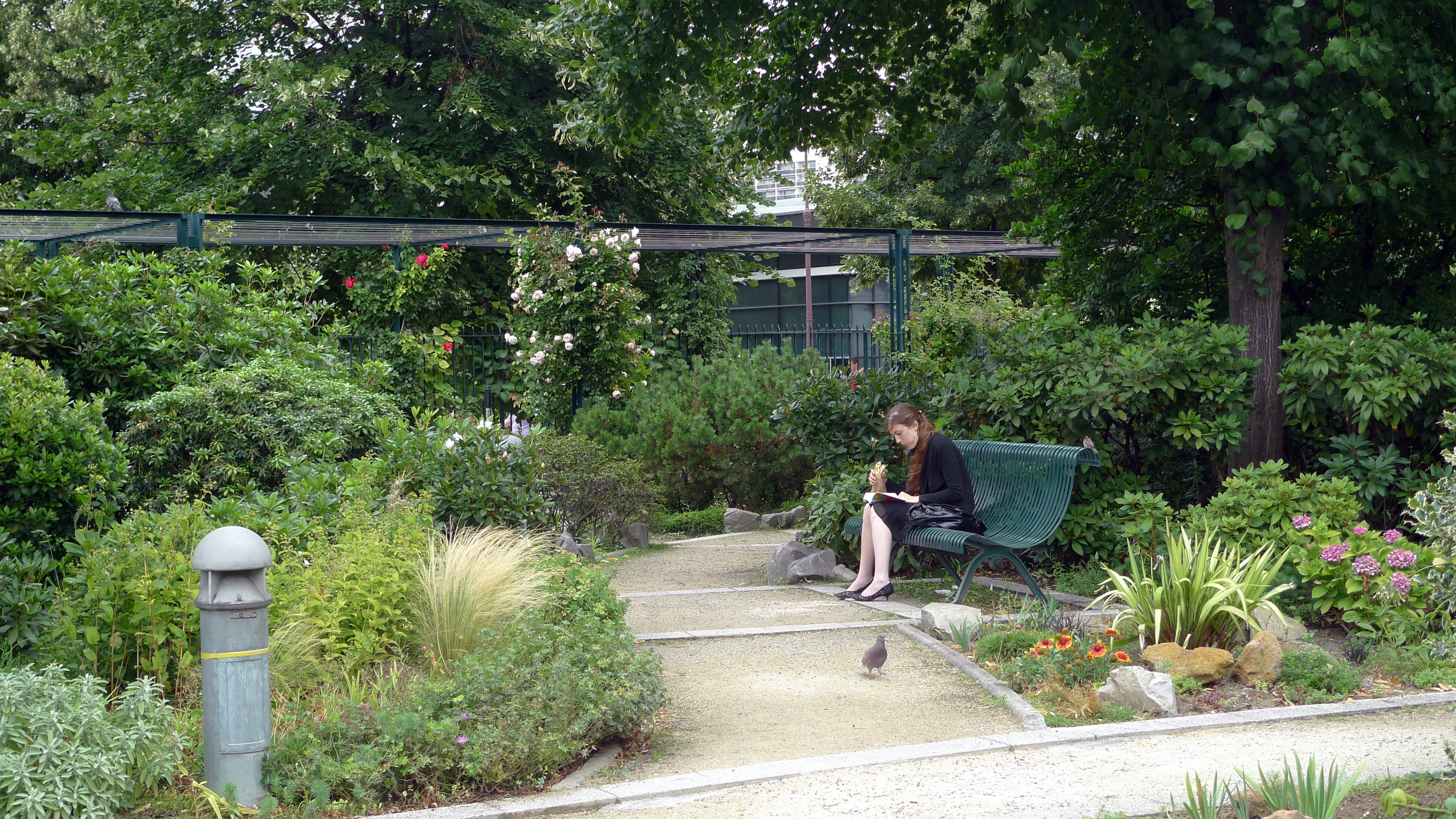
Part of the Jardin de Reuilly, as seen from a pedestrian bridge on the Coulée verte

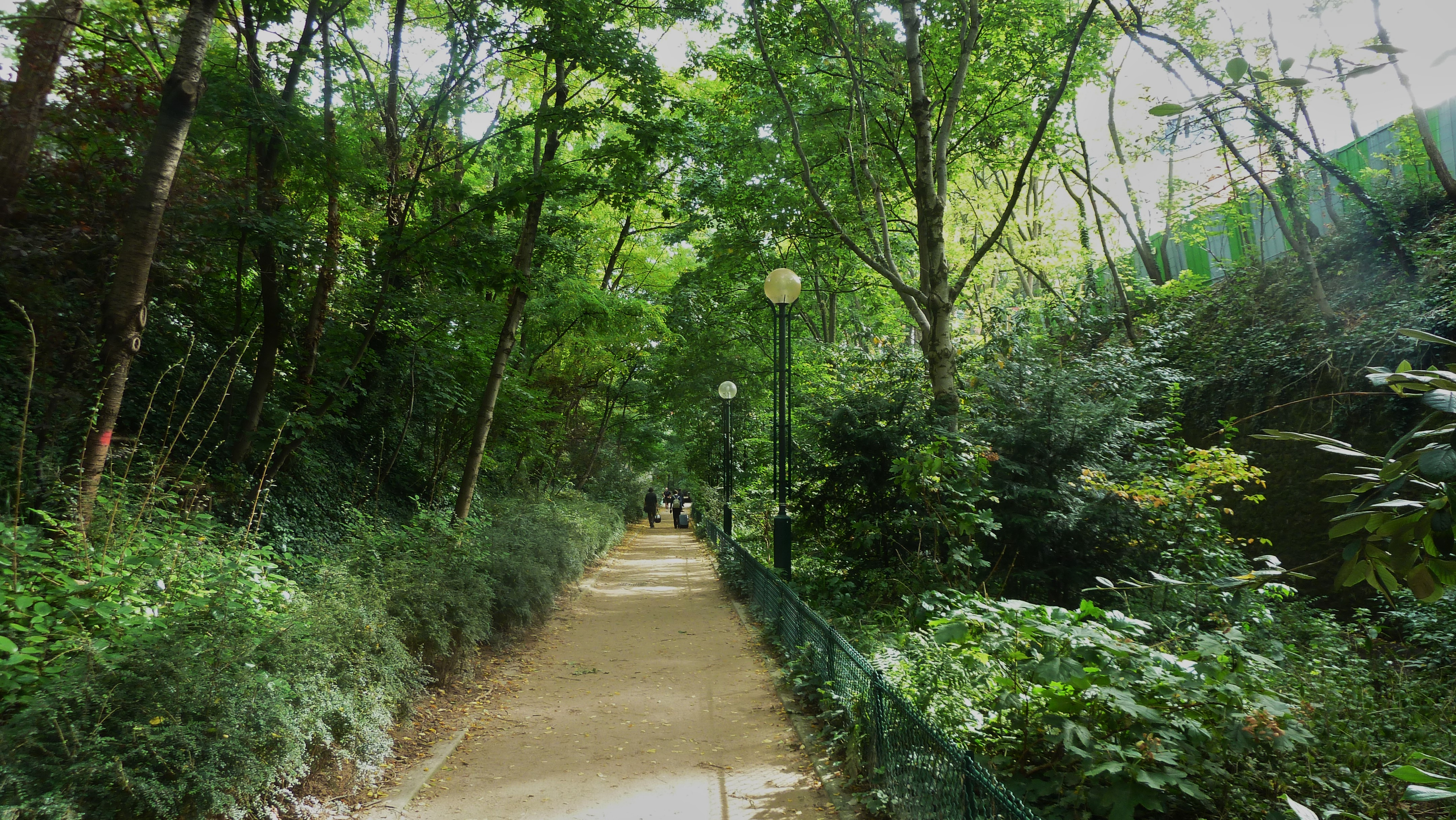
A view of the eastern section of the Coulée verte

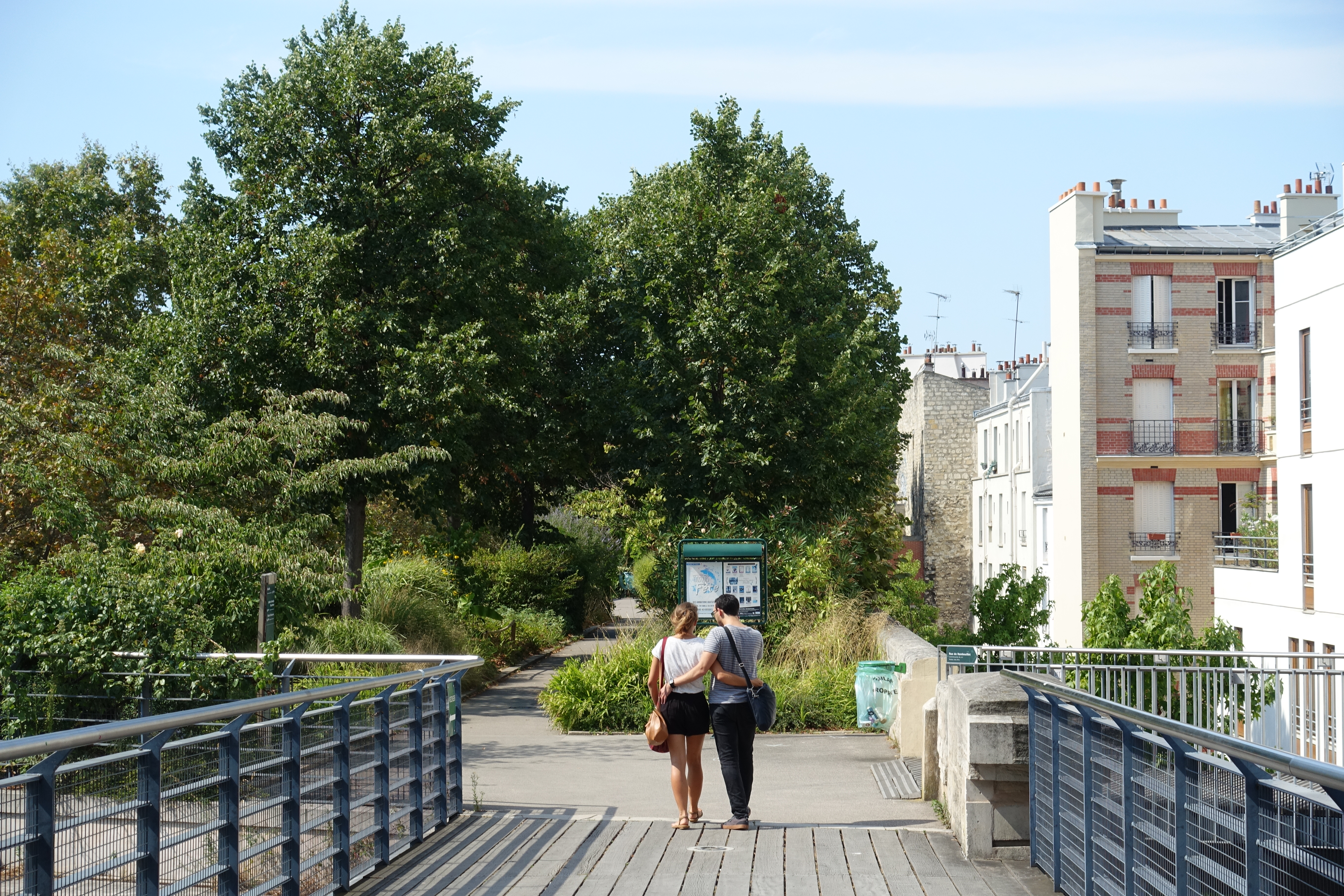
One of the Coulée verte's pedestrian bridges

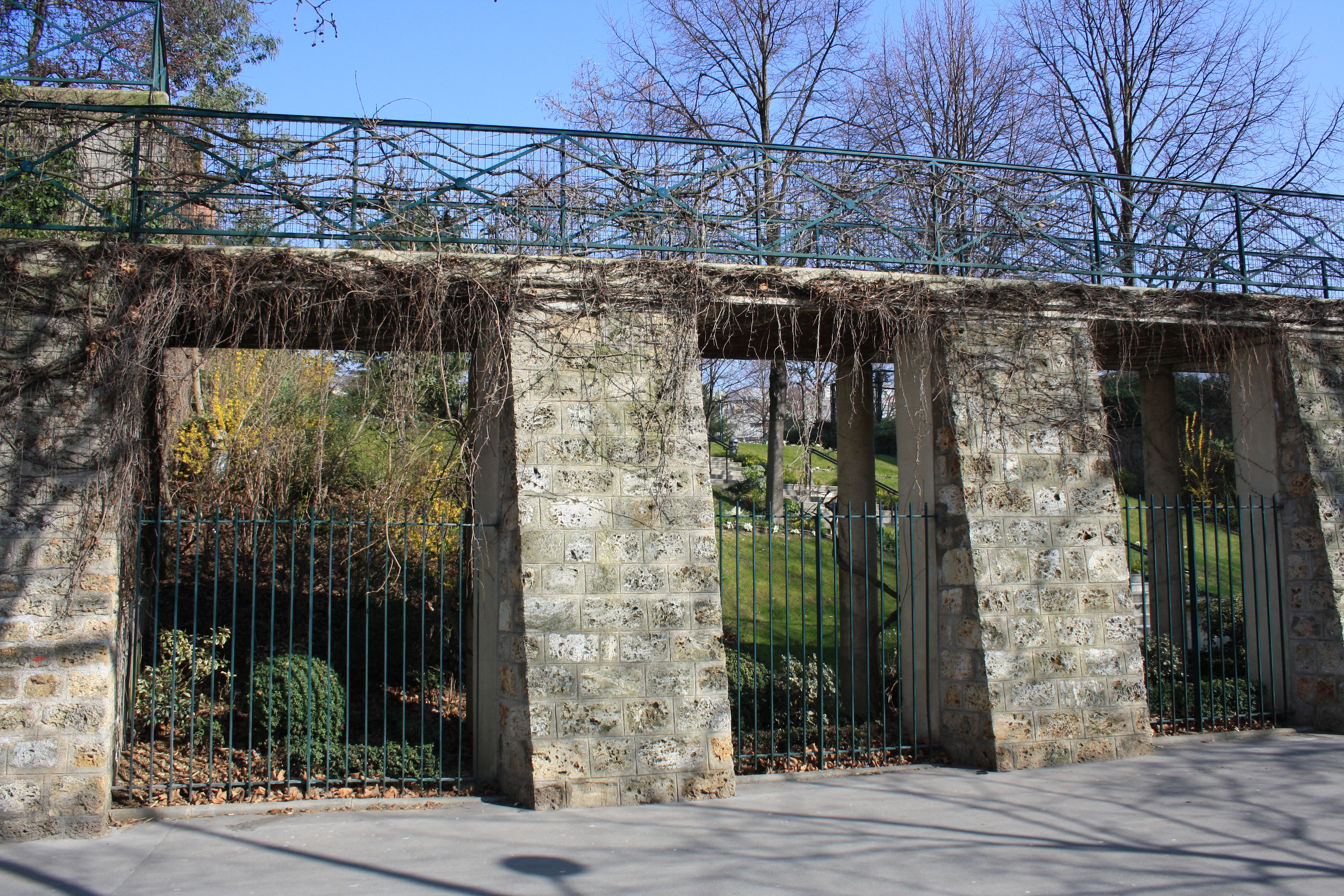
Entrance to the Jardin de Reuilly on Avenue Daumesnil

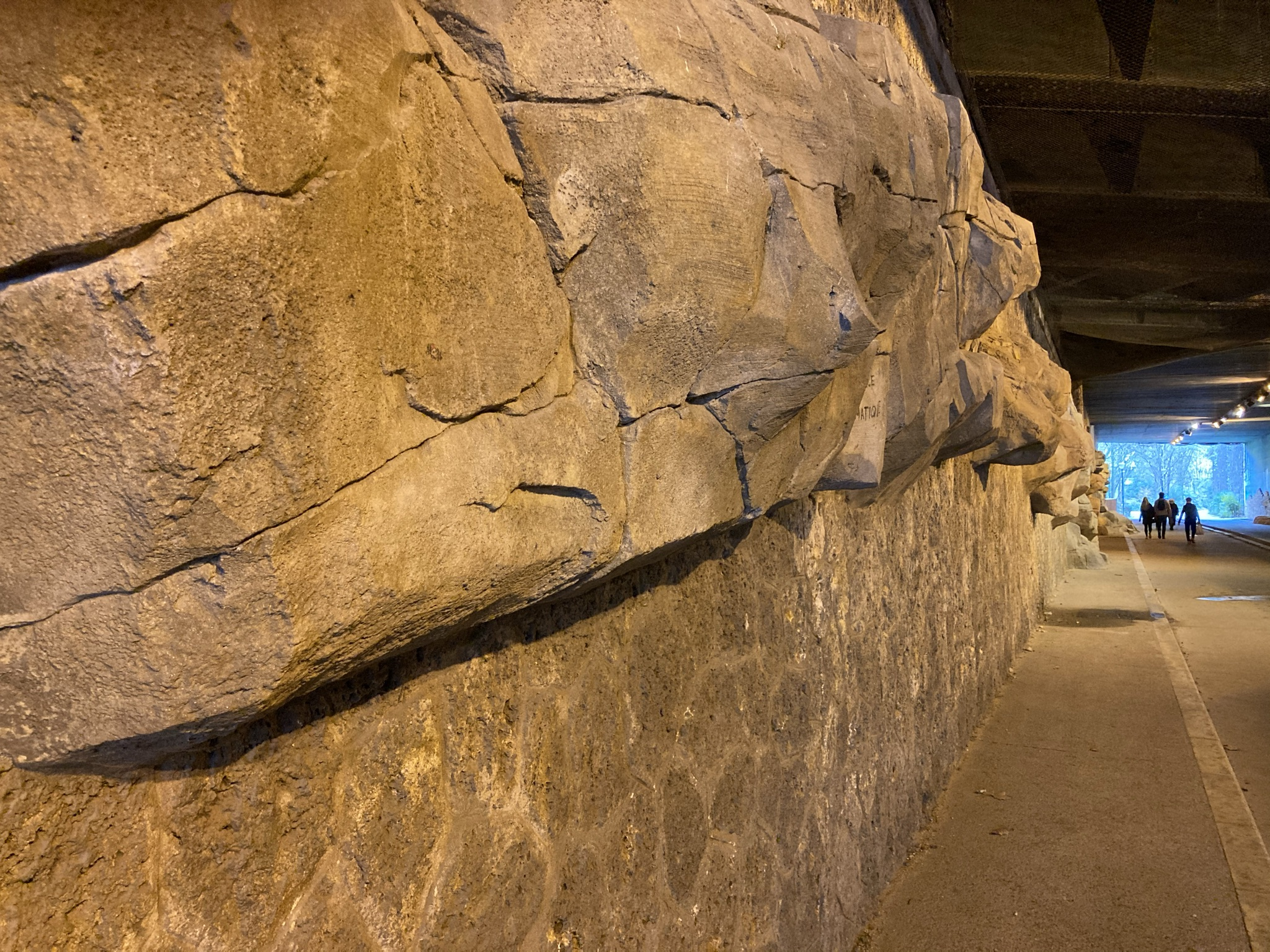
Artificial rocks in one of the Coulée verte’s tunnels

== See also ==
- List of parks and gardens in Paris
- Rotterdam Hofplein railway station, similar former railway in Rotterdam
- High Line, elevated park in Manhattan, New York City
- Bloomingdale Trail, similar elevated park in Chicago
- Lowline, planned underground park in Manhattan, New York City
- Harsimus Stem Embankment, planned rail trail in Jersey City, New Jersey
- Maidashi ryokuchi, a park in Fukuoka, Japan
- Queensway, planned rail trail in Queens, New York City
- Rails-to-Trails Conservancy (RTC)
- Reading Viaduct, planned rail trail in Philadelphia
- Greenway, London
- The Atlanta Beltline, Atlanta, Georgia
- The Arbutus Greenway in Vancouver, British Columbia
