= Maidashi Ryokuchi =

Elevated rail trail in Higashi-ku, Fukuoka, Japan

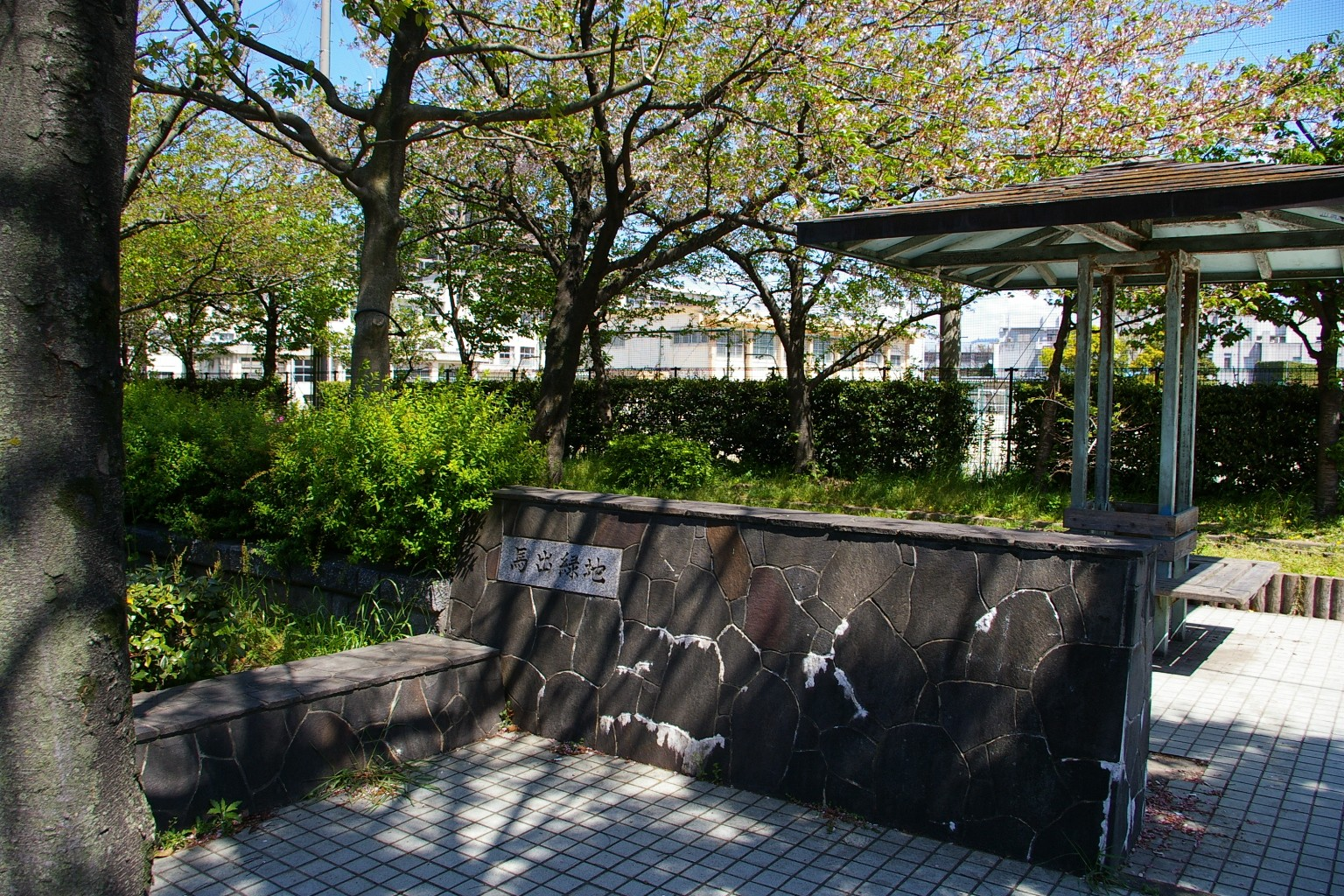
Maidashi Ryokuchi park entrance marker

Maidashi Ryokuchi (Japanese: 馬出緑地) is an elevated linear park, greenway, and rail trail in Maidashi, Higashi-ku, Fukuoka, Japan. It is officially named Maidashi Green Space No. 8 (第8号馬出緑地).

The park is located in Fukuoka's green belt and is an example of the reuse of abandoned railway land in an urban setting. Nishi-Nippon Railroad sold the property to the city in 1980.

== Location ==
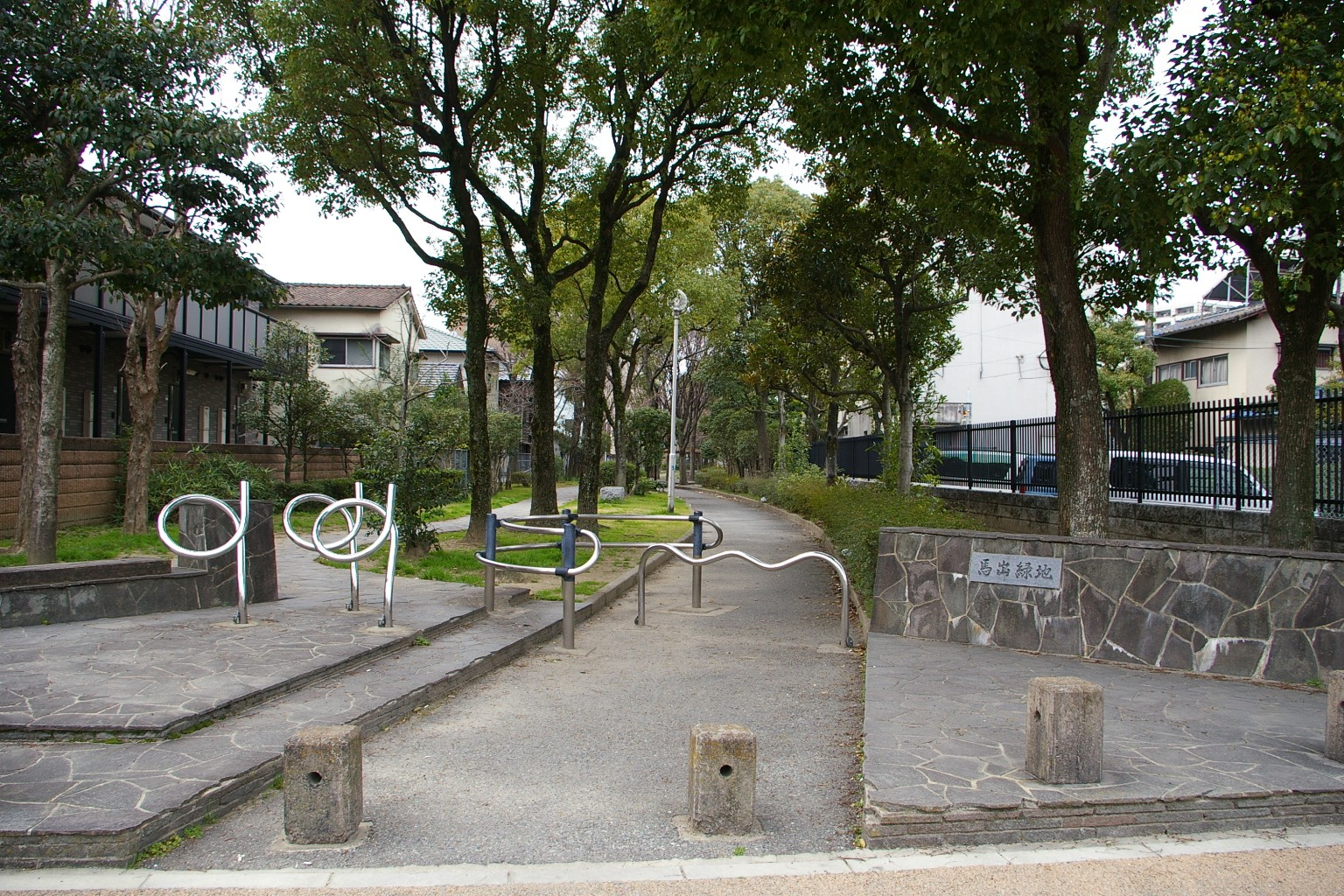
Maidashi Ryokuchi entrance

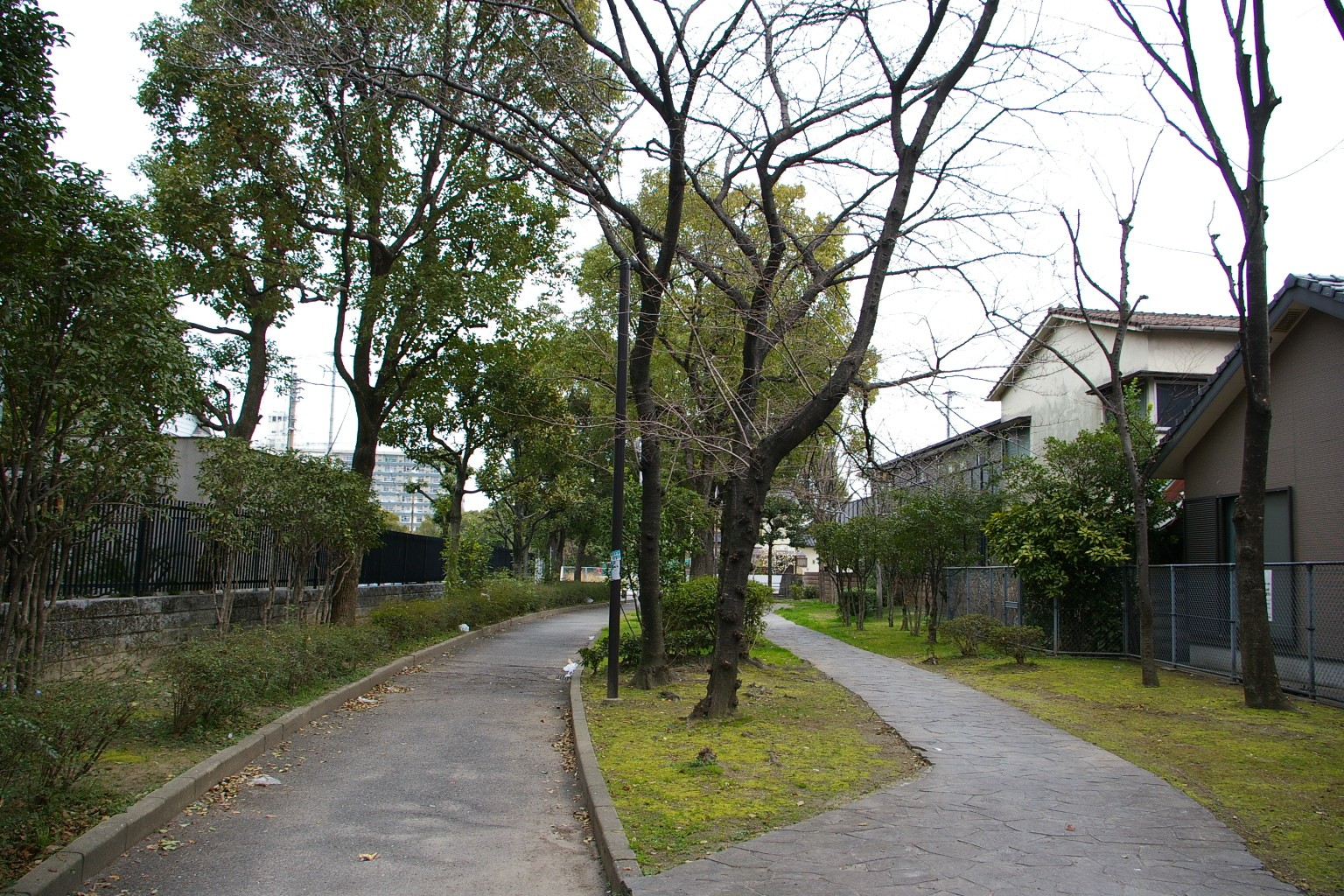
Barrier-free stone pavement

Maidashi Ryokuchi was designed as a children's playground with a public water fountain, playing equipment, and a nature trail. The barrier-free nature trail provides a recreation area for older people and for students from the nearby Fukuoka Junior High School. Located near Yume Town Hakata, it is overlooked by the local intermediate school and provides a safe place for children to play. It is the biggest of the ten public parks in the Maidashi school district.

== Historical development ==
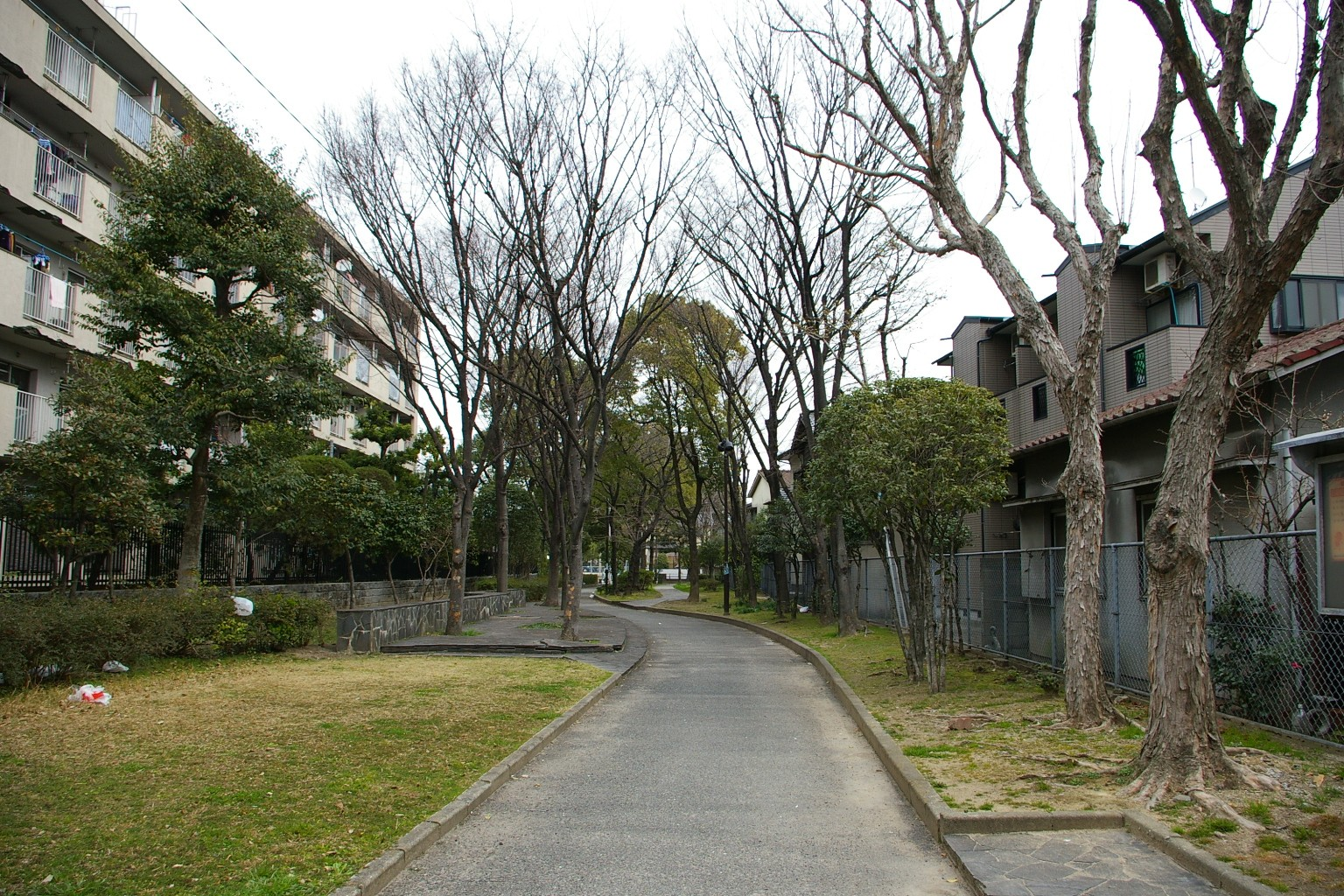
The garden and the surrounding building estate.

In the Edo period the site of today's Maidashi Ryokuchi was covered by Hakata Bay. The majority of the coastline was natural, described as "white sand and green pines" (白砂青松). However, at the beginning of the Meiji era, it was reclaimed by a large-scale landfill. In those days, before mechanized equipment, human laborers carried dirt with straw mats onto the silt layer to create the landfill. The white beaches and green pines are no longer visible in today's Maidashi greenbelt.

In 1924, Hakata wan Tetsudo Kisen (博多湾鉄道汽船, Hakata Bay Railway and Steamship Company) built the electrical tramway between Shin Hakata (新博多, New Hakata station) and Kazu shirama (和白間). In 1925, it was extended to Miyaji dake (宮地岳). After the extension, the company became the Nishi-Nippon Railroad Co., Ltd. (西日本鉄道会社) In 1951, the railroad between Miyajidake and Tsuyazaki (津屋崎) was opened. In 1954, the block distance of southern 3.3 kilometers railway from Nishi tetsu tatara (西鉄多々良) was set apart and combined with Nishi-tetsu Fukuoka city line (西鉄福岡市内線). In 1980, after the Nishi-tetsu Takechi line ceased operations, Fukuoka City Council bought the land. After six years of renovation as a part of the redevelopment of Maidashi finally transformed the land into the park we have today. It was built in keeping with the low-rise apartments surrounding it and as a part of the garden city movement.

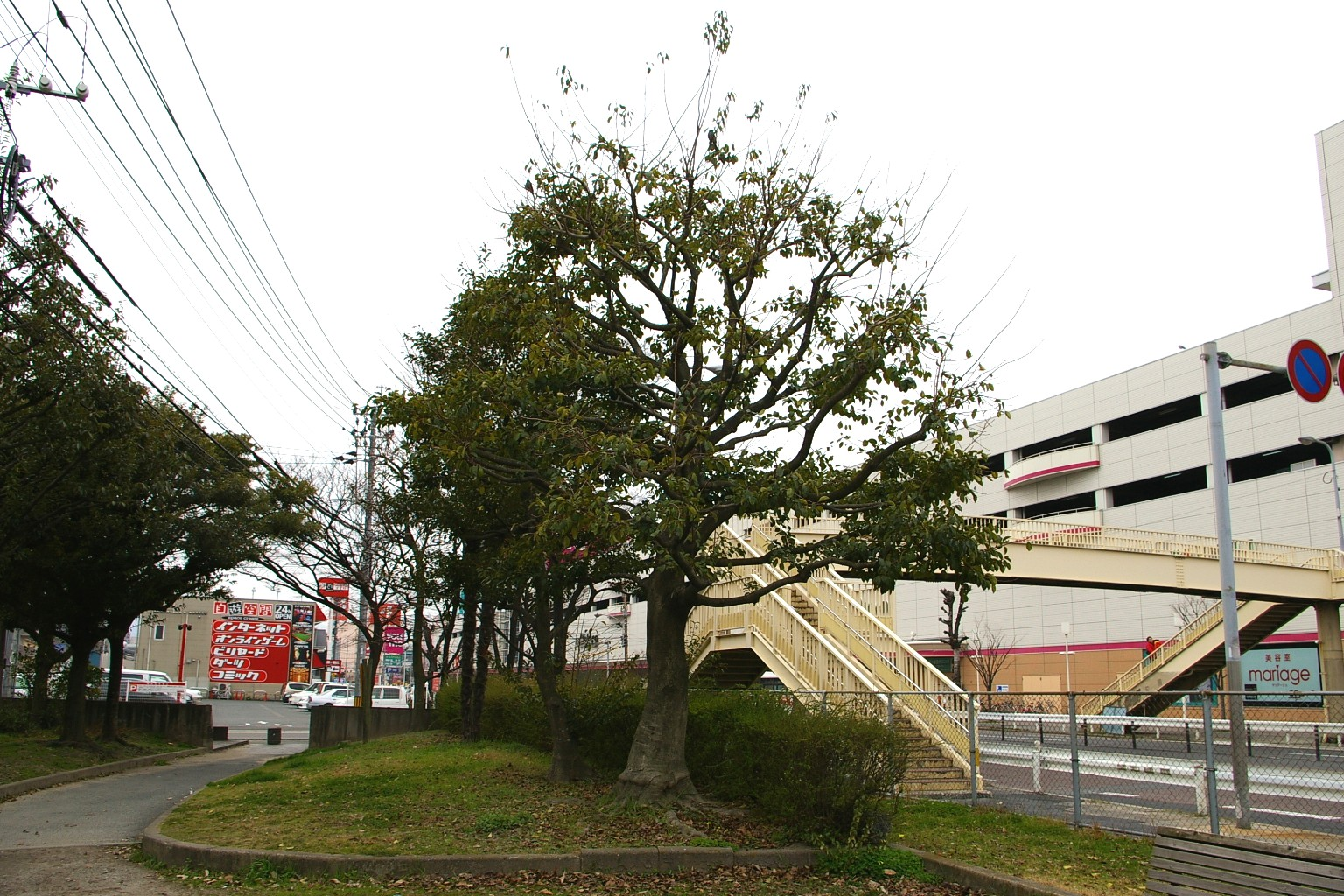
Pedestrian bridge

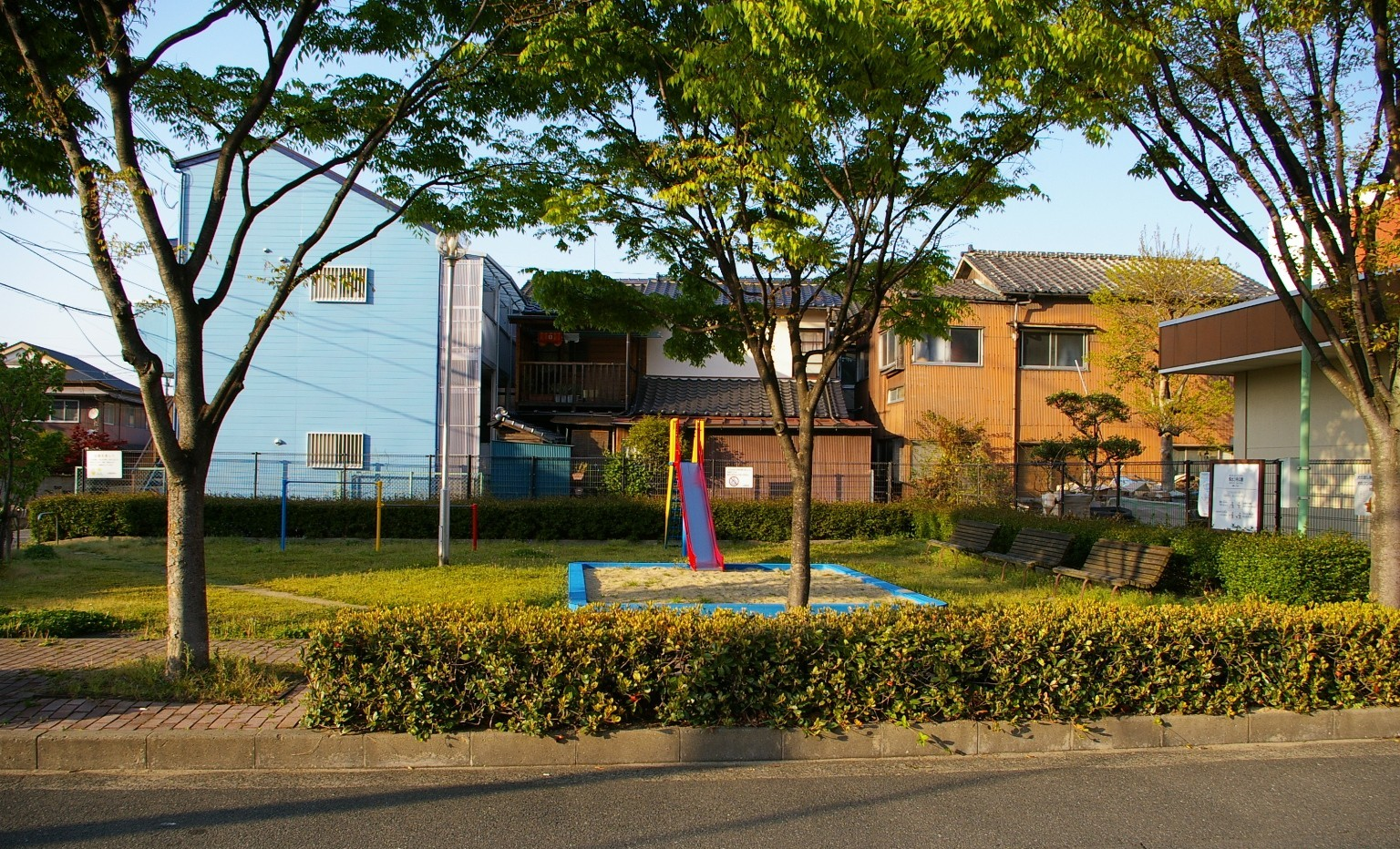
Maidashi Park #3

As the property was not originally designed to be a park, its shape is elongated, conforming to the shape of the railway line and runs for three blocks, though it is bisected by a roadway. The gate of the park replaces the now-absent Maidashi 3 chome depot. The Nishi tetsu (Nishi-Nippon Railroad Co., Ltd.) Bus has replaced the railway. The park is not independent of the eighth Maidashi green belt, there are batteries of green belts with serial numbers as province. As presented above, arising from the unusual history of the installation, the Maidashi green belt gives the citizens opportunities to learn from the modern history of Fukuoka since the Meiji era.

== As a route to youme Town Hakata ==
At the line extension of this belt, there is an area of pre-road over Route 3 youme Town Hakata from Prefectural Road 517 to youme Town Hakata. Between this green belt and youme Town Hakata, there is Route 3 with a pedestrian bridge built over it where children can cross safely.

== Voluntary management ==
The management of Maidashi Ryokuchi is run by the Maidashi Green Belt Community Association, which employs a model of self-management. General maintenance of the area and its amenities is carried out by local residents on a volunteer basis and is supported by the Fukuoka City Council.

== Associated parks ==
=== Maidashi 1st park ===
Maidashi 1st park is a small garden located next to Maidashi Ryokuchi. The 8th Maidashi Ryokuchi is a children's playground with a sandpit.

== Nearest stations ==
- Fukuoka City Subway Hakozaki-Miyamae Station
- Maidashi-Kyūdai-byōin-mae Station

== See also ==
- Maidashi
- Greenway, London
- High Line
- Bloomingdale Trail
- Reading Viaduct
- Coulée verte René-Dumont
