= Basilica of Sant'Eufemia, Spoleto =

Church in Spoleto, Italy

Coordinates: 42.7347°N 12.7383°E

Sant'Eufemia is a romanesque-style, Roman Catholic basilica church in the town of Spoleto, in the province of Perugia, region of Umbria, Italy. The church is dedicated to Saint Euphemia of Chalcedon.

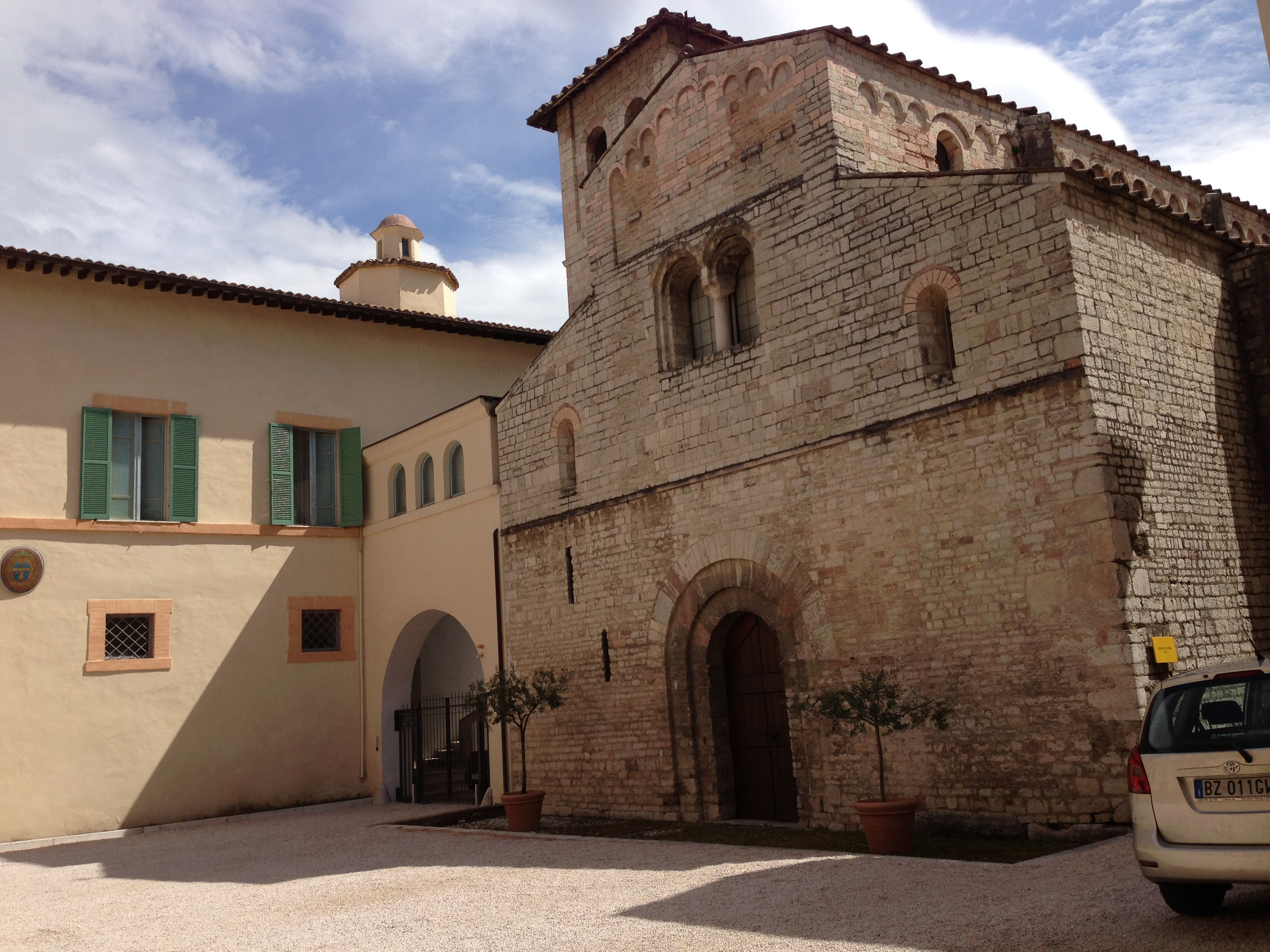
Facade of Sant'Eufemia

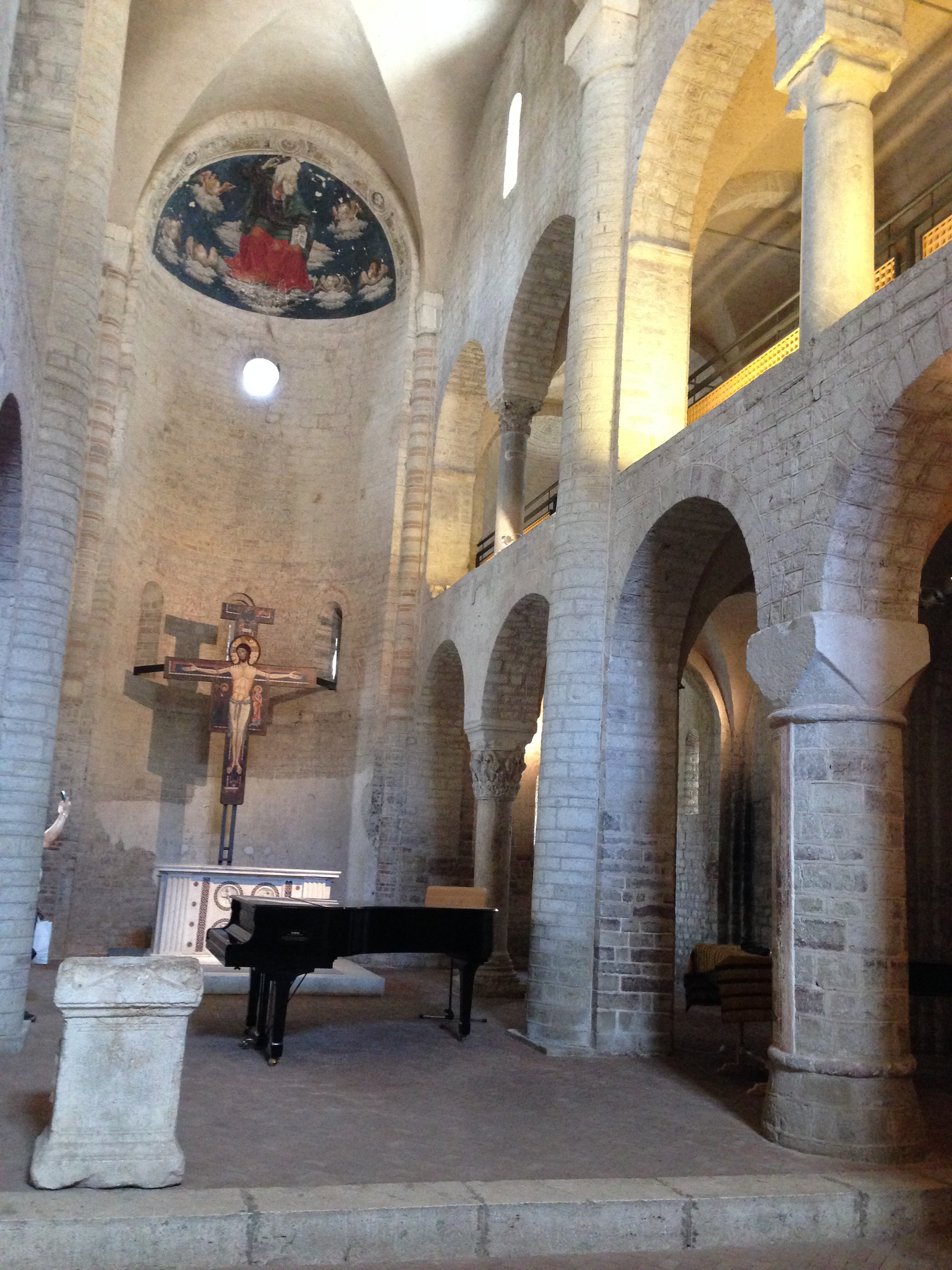
Romanesque-style interior nave

== History ==
The church arose inside the walls of what once the palace of the Lombard-ruled Dukes of Spoleto, which became the archbishop's palace. The titular saint was said to have lived at this site. A church at the site is recalled as being present around the 8th to 9th centuries. A Benedictine monastery adjacent to the church dates to the 10th century. By the 12th-century, the church was encompassed by the Palazzo Vescovile.

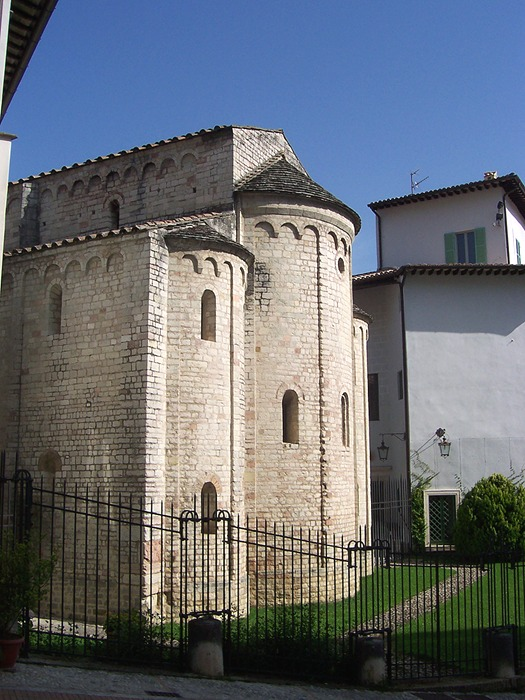
Exterior of apse of church

The original triptych that was once found in the main altar is now in the Diocesan museum. The frescoes in the apse ceiling depicting the God the Father and cherubs, dates to the 15th century.
