= Giustina Abbà =

Italian partisan, anti-fascist and worker

- Born: 1903; Rovinj, Croatia
- Died: 24 September 1974 (aged 70–71); Rovinj, Croatia
- Occupation: Anti-fascist partisan

Giustina Abbà (1903 – 24 September 1974) was an Italian and Croatian partisan, anti-fascist and worker.

== Biography ==
Giustina Abbà, a feminist and a worker at the tobacco factory in Rovinj/Rovigno, was the first woman to join the partisan movement in Istria with her father and her son, born from her marriage to her husband Giovanni.

In 1942, Giustina Abbà, who had joined the underground Communist Party that year, organised with other women workers a successful strike "against hunger and war". The fascist militia and carabinieri intervened, suppressing the demonstration and arresting Giustina and the comrades who had exposed themselves the most. Freed, she was soon one of the founders of the Popular Liberation Movement of Rovinj/Rovigno. After the World War II, she was imprisoned several times under Tito and was active in the Rovinj/Rovigno Anti-Fascist Women's Front until her death. Her son was an officer in the Partisan Battalion Pino Budicin.

== Bibliography ==
- Privileggio, Giorgio (1973). "Memorie dell'antifascismo e della Resistenza agosto 1943 – mango 1945". Quaderni (in Italian). III (1): 371–395. ISSN 0350-6746.
- "Centro di Ricerche Storiche Rovigno". diazilla.com (in Italian).
