= Church of St. Euphemia, Rovinj =

Roman Catholic church in Rovinj, Croatia

Coordinates: 45°4′59.5″N 13°37′52″E

Church of St. Euphemia
- Crkva svete Eufemije
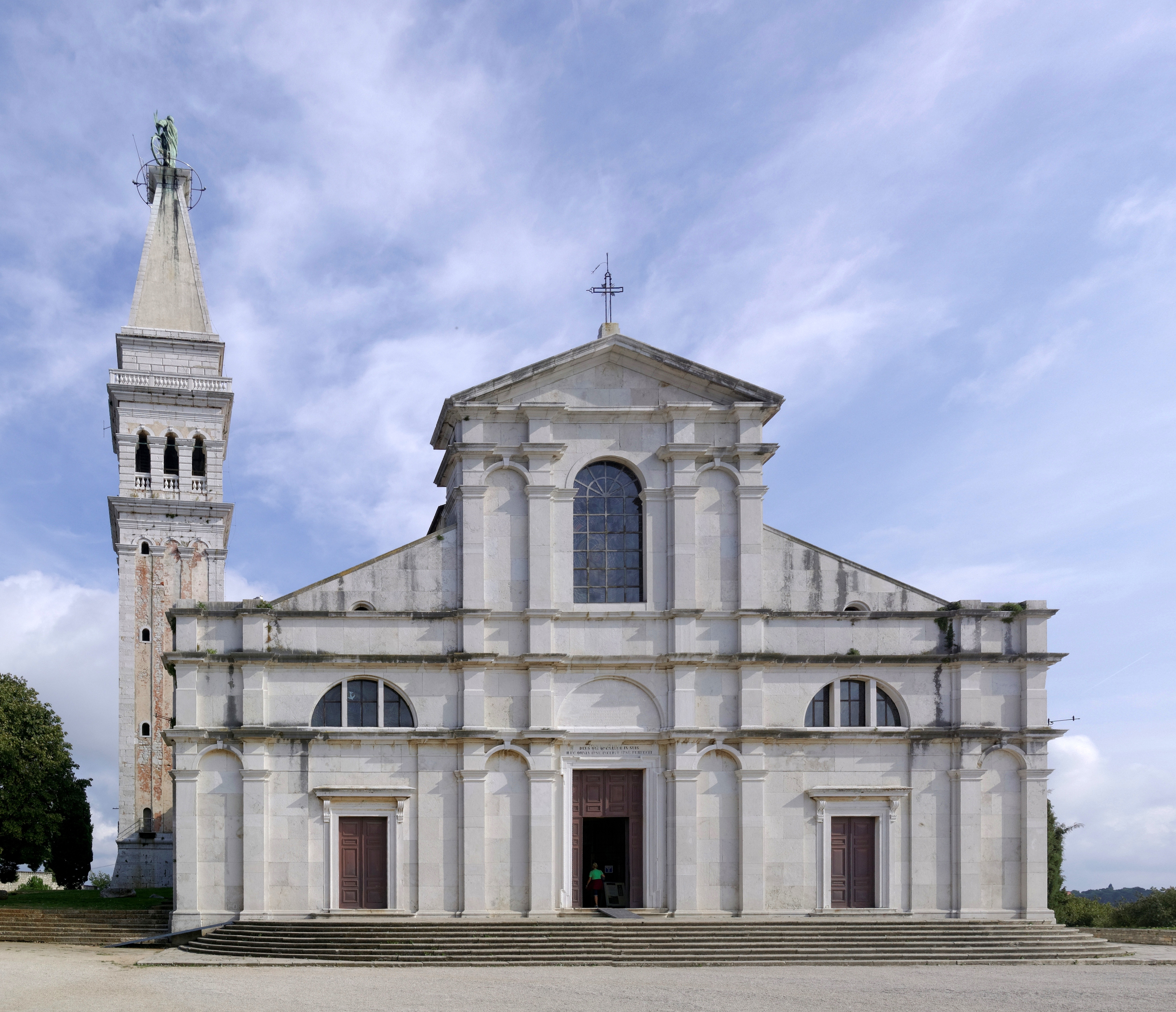
- West front of the Church of St. Euphemia
- Church of St. Euphemia
- Location: Rovinj, Istria County
- Country: Croatia
- Denomination: Roman Catholic

History
- Status: Parish church
- Dedication: Saint Euphemia

Architecture
- Functional status: Active
- Architectural type: Baroque church
- Style: Baroque Architecture
- Years built: 1725–1736

Specifications
- Height: 61 m

Administration
- Diocese: Diocese of Poreč and Pula

The Church of St. Euphemia, often known as the Basilica of St. Euphemia (although it is not formally a basilica minor) and by locals as the Church of St. Fuma, is a Baroque church located on a hilltop in the heart of the historic part of Rovinj, Croatia.

== Description ==
This three-nave church was built from 1725 to 1736, over the remains of older, early Christian structures. The dedication was originally to Saint George, later to Saints George and Euphemia; the present building is dedicated to Euphemia only. Its façade dates from 1883.

The relics of Saint Euphemia are preserved in a Roman sarcophagus from the sixth century (but adapted in the 15th century). The church contains several treasures and works of art: Gothic statues from the 15th century, paintings from the 16th and the 17th centuries: Last Supper and Christ in the Gethsemane.

The bell tower resembles the tower of St Mark's Basilica in Venice. It was built during 1654–1680, to the plans by Antonio Manopola. On top of this 60 m-high tower stands the statue of Saint Euphemia, serving as a wind vane.

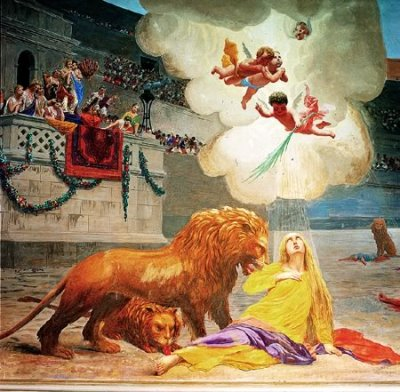
Painting displayed in the Church depicting the martyrdom of Saint Euphemia

Situated on a hilltop, the church is described by Alice Lee Moqué in Delightful Dalmatia:

"At first glance it is seen that the tower with its golden angel is almost an exact copy of the campanile in Venice, only this angel is Saint Eufemia, the little town's patron saint...whose marvelous experiences are plainly depicted upon the walls of the chapel."

== Legend of the sarcophagus ==
Recorded by Alice Lee Moqué, an American suffragette and travel writer, is the local legend of how the sarcophagus was received by the Church. The legend begins with two fisherman caught in a storm who, having lost control of their ship, fall to their knees in earnest prayer. Their prayers are answered and they wake safely near Rovinj's shore to see a shining white light over an object that sinks into the sea. Unable to retrieve the object, they hurry to tell the townspeople of the miracle, but none can move the heavy object until a pious boy makes a plan to retrieve the gift with oxen. The oxen pull the sarcophagus from the water and carry it up the mountain. A skeptic is struck unconscious in the presence of the sarcophagus, later revealing that he'd received a vision from Saint Euphemia that the sarcophagus contained her bones. In the town's folklore, it is said that the hill has been named the "Hill of St Euphemia" ever since, even as the relics were stolen by the Genoese, who lost them to the Venetians, not being returned to the town until the 14th century.

== Gallery ==
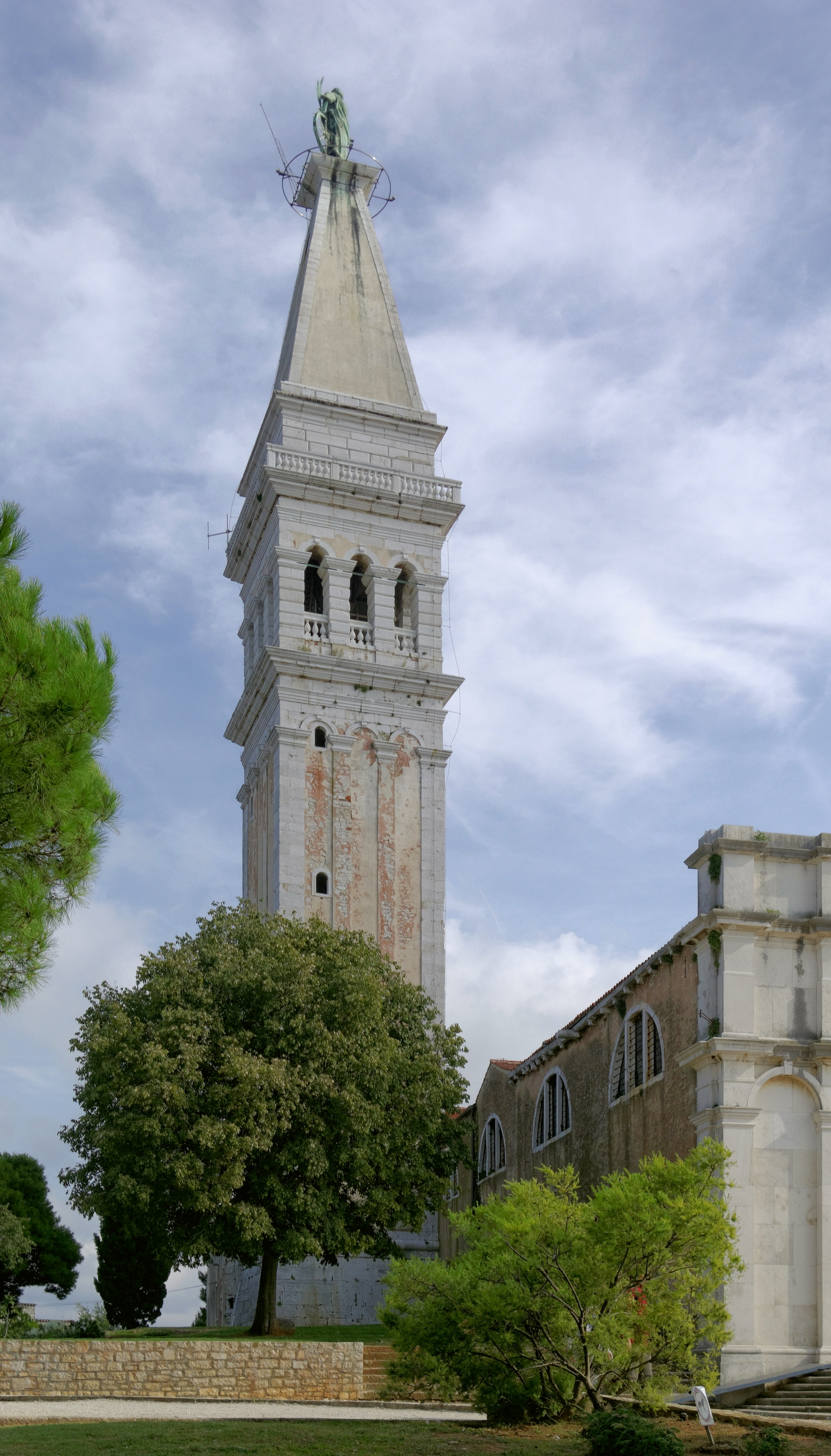
Tower bell

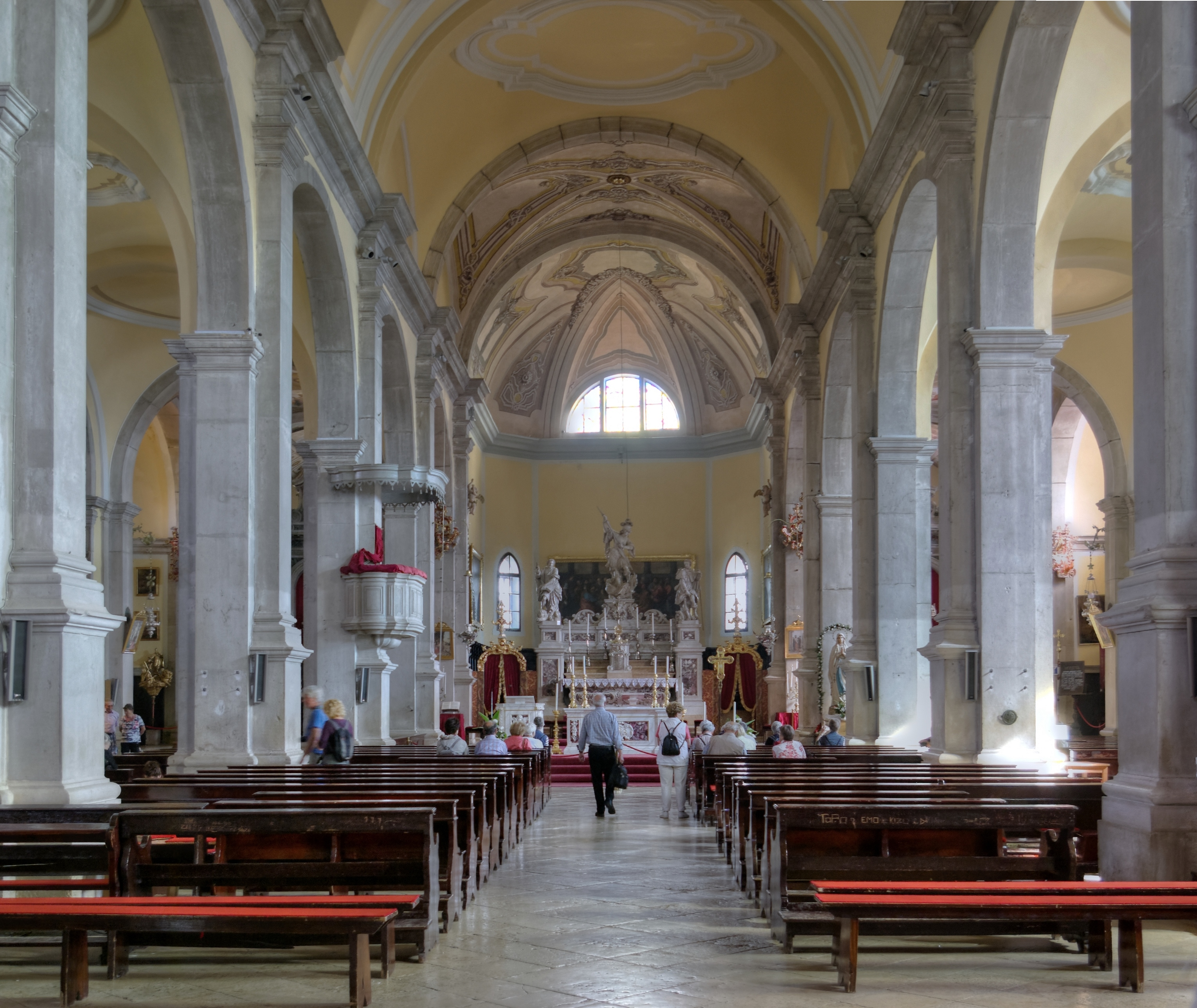
Interior of the Church

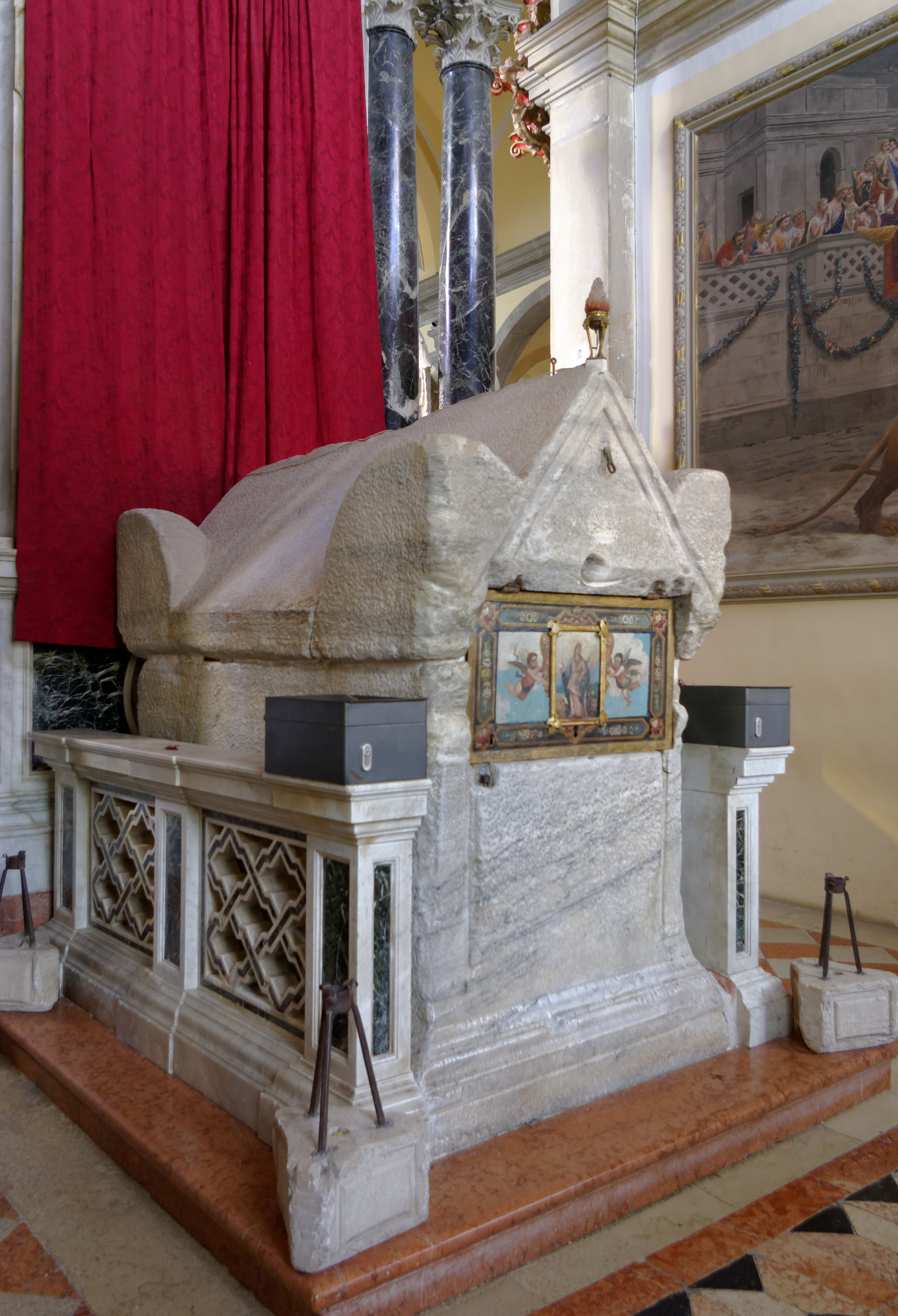
Reliquary of St. Euphemia

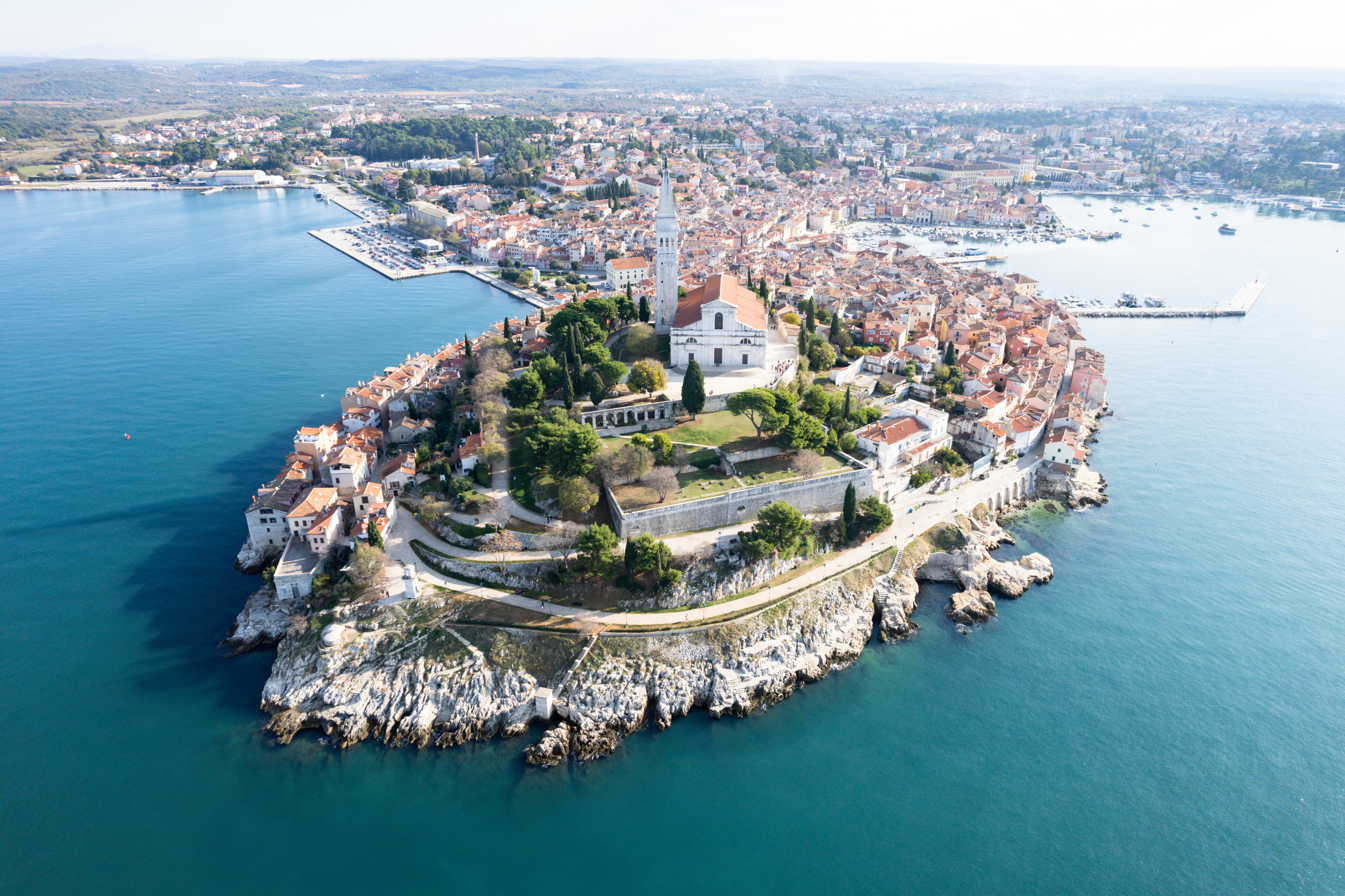
Aerial view of the Church

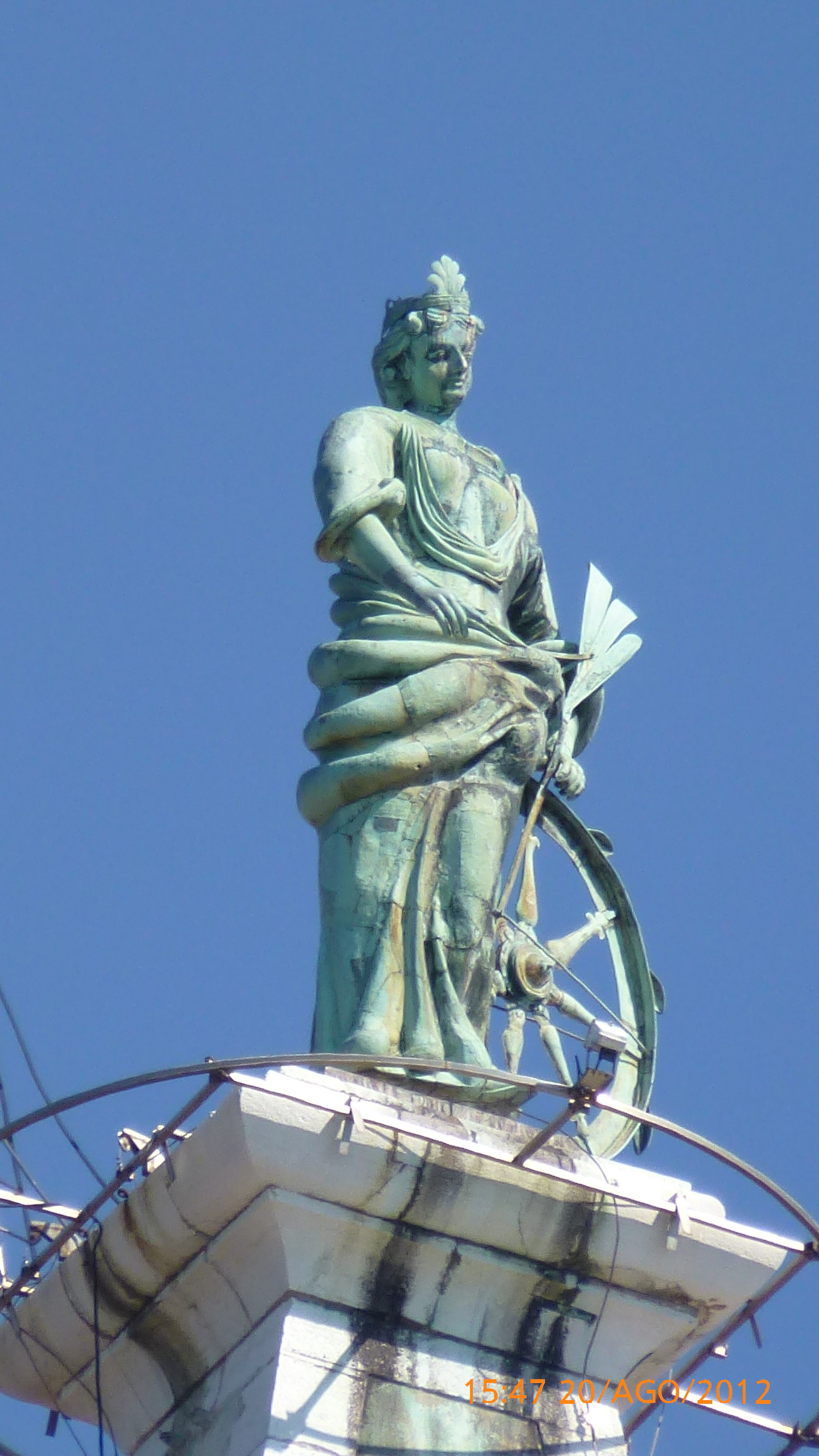
Statue of St. Euphemia on top of the tower bell

== Sources ==
- Marković, Vladimir (1996). "Crkva sv. Eufemije u Rovinju - između projekta i izgradnje" (PDF). Prilozi Povijesti Umjetnosti U Dalmaciji (in Croatian). 36 (1): 263–270.
