= Euphemia =

Christian virgin and martyr saint

Saint Euphemia
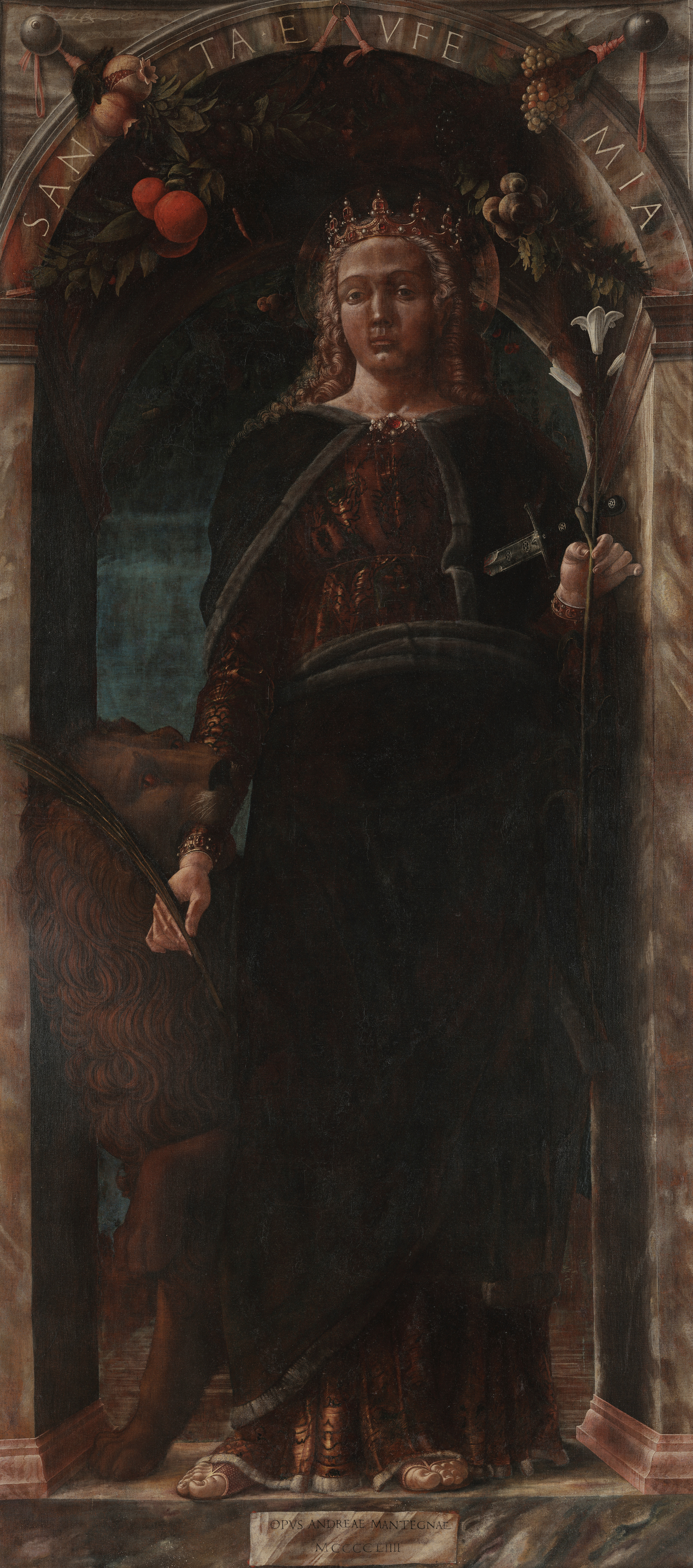
- Saint Euphemia, Andrea Mantegna, tempera on canvas, 1454

Virgin, martyr
- Died: October 16?, 303 AD: Chalcedon, Bithynia; (modern-day Kadıköy, Istanbul, Turkey)
- Venerated in: Catholic Church; Eastern Orthodox Church; Church of England; Oriental Orthodox Church
- Major shrine: Orthodox Patriarchal Cathedral of St. George, Istanbul, Church of St. Euphemia, Rovinj, Croatia
- Feast: September 16 (martyrdom); July 11 (miracle)
- Attributes: surrounded by one or a few lions, often holding a wheel or a cross

Euphemia (Greek: Εὐφημία; 'well-spoken [of]'), also known as the Great martyr Euphemia the All-praised in the Eastern Orthodox Church, was a virgin martyr, who died for her faith at Chalcedon in 303 AD.

According to tradition, Euphemia was martyred for refusing to offer sacrifices to Ares. She was arrested and after suffering various tortures, died in the arena at Chalcedon from a wound sustained from a bear. Her tomb became a site of pilgrimages. She is commemorated on September 16.

== Historical background ==
Euphemia's name and year of death are recorded in the 5th century Martyrologium Hieronymianum, the earliest extant list of Christian martyrs. The year, 303, was the first year of the Great Persecution under Roman emperor Diocletian. The Fasti vindobonenses, a collection of liturgical documents from the 4th to 6th centuries, says she died on the 16 October. Other than this, there is no verifiable historical information about Euphemia.

Egeria, who made a pilgrimage to the Holy Land about 381-384 and wrote an account of her travels, relates being shown the site of Euphemia's martyrdom in Chalcedon. Euphemia became a famous saint and stories about her accumulated; the Golden Legend, a collection of hagiographies from about 1260, includes an account of her martyrdom.

== Hagiography ==
St. Euphemia lived on the cusp of the 3rd and 4th centuries AD. According to tradition, she was the daughter of a senator named Philophronos and his wife Theodosia in Chalcedon, located across the Bosporus from the city of Byzantium (modern-day Istanbul). From her youth she was consecrated to virginity.

The governor of Chalcedon, Priscus, had made a decree that all of the inhabitants of the city take part in sacrifices to the deity Ares. Euphemia was discovered with forty-nine other Christians hiding in a house and worshipping God, in defiance of the governor's orders. Because of their refusal to sacrifice, they were tortured for a number of days, and then, all but Euphemia, sent to the Emperor for trial. Euphemia, the youngest among them, was separated from her companions and subjected to particularly harsh torments, including the wheel, in hopes of breaking her spirit. She prayed and accepted martyrdom for her Christian faith, and was ultimately sentenced to death by wild beasts. Accounts of her final martyrdom state that the beasts (described as lions or bears) delivered a merciful death blow but refused to defile her body, affirming the universal resurrection.

== Relics ==
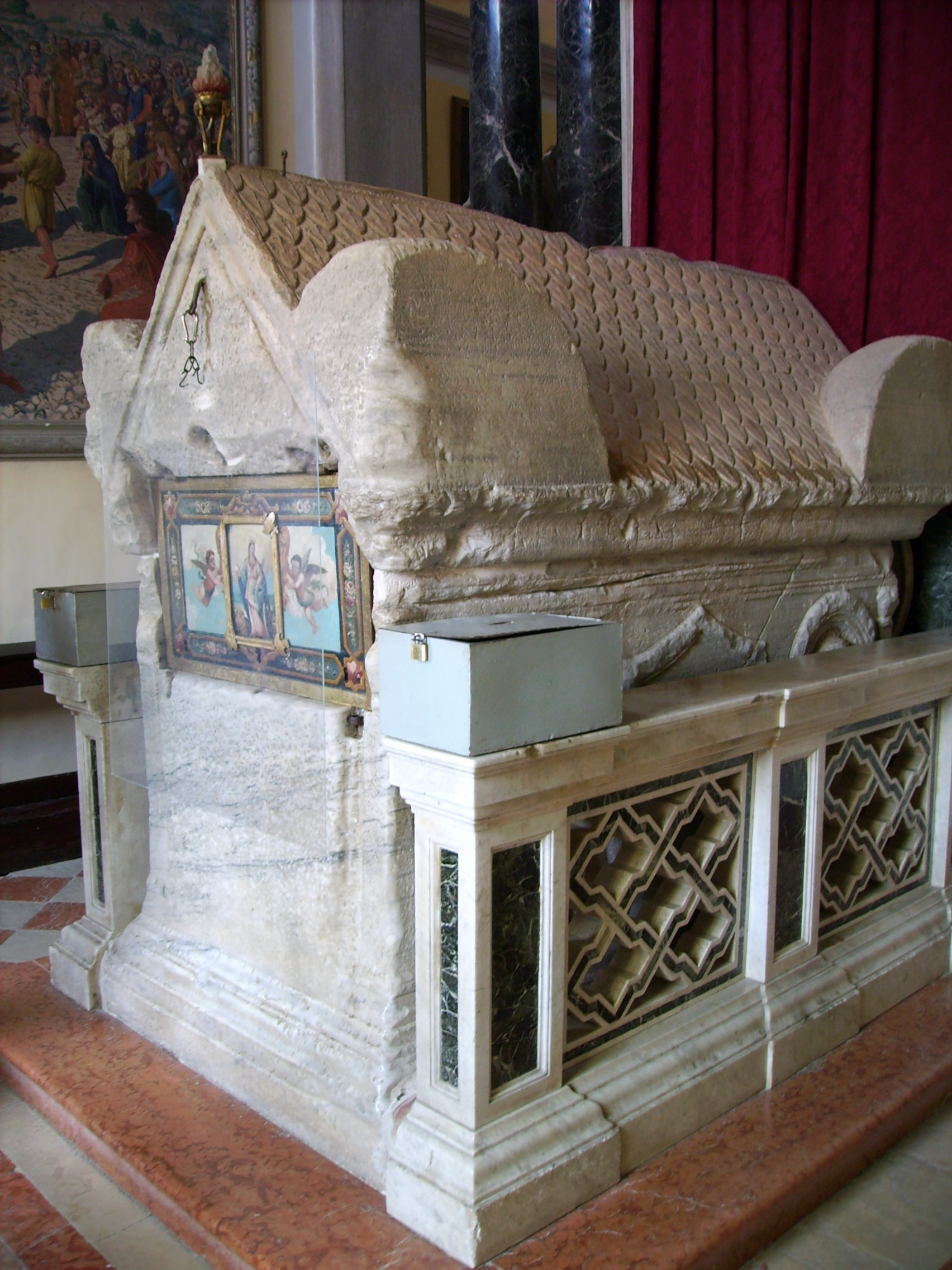
Sarcophagus containing some of the relics of Saint Euphemia in Rovinj.

Following her death, Euphemia's relics were gathered by Christians and kept in a reqliuary kept in a church named in her honor in Chalcedon. The church became the site of the Council of Chalcedon in 451.

Around the year 620, in the wake of the conquest of Chalcedon by the Sasanian Empire in the year 617, the relics of Saint Euphemia were transferred to a new church in Constantinople. There, amid the Byzantine Iconoclasm, her reliquary was said to have been thrown into the sea, from which it was recovered by the ship-owning brothers Sergios and Sergonos, who belonged to the Orthodox party, and who gave it over to the local bishop who hid them in a secret crypt. The relics were afterwards taken to the Island of Lemnos, and in 796 they were returned to Constantinople. The majority of her relics are still in the Patriarchal Cathedral Church of St. George, in Istanbul.

A reliquary believed to contain Euphemia's head and body was situated in the Church of St John of the Collachium, the conventual church of the Knights Hospitaller on Rhodes, by 1479.

=== Miracle during the Council of Chalcedon ===
According to the Synaxarion of Constantinople, a collection of hagiographies, during the 5th century Chalcedonian schism both the Chalcedonian Christian ("Orthodox") and non-Chalcedonian Christian ("Monophysite") parties wrote a confession of their faith and placed them on the breast of Saint Euphemia within her tomb. After three days the tomb was opened and the scroll with the Chalcedonian confession was seen in the right hand of St Euphemia while the scroll of the non-Chalcedonians lay at her feet.

The non-Chalcedonian Oriental Orthodox contest the veracity of the account as a post-hoc legend, as the Synaxarion of Constantinople was not published until the 11th-century. The account claims that a certain "tome of the monophysites" was found at her feet; however, no such tome has existed, neither Monophysite nor Miaphysite, and Pope Dioscorus I of Alexandria had not written any tomes of such nature. No letter, acts of a council, apologetic, or other works of any kind reference such a miracle either after Chalcedon, including a letter to Leo of Rome by the council in which it mentions Euphemia (as Chalcedon is her city) without any miracle.

== Veneration ==
The primary feast day of Saint Euphemia, celebrated by both Eastern and Western Christians is 16 September in commemoration of her martyrdom. In the Coptic Orthodox Church, her feast day is on Abib 17, corresponding to July 11 in the Gregorian calendar. Additionally, Eastern Orthodox Christians commemorate her alleged miracle at the Council of Chalcedon on July 11.

St. Euphemia is a highly venerated saint across all Christian traditions, celebrated for her unwavering faith in the face of persecution, which ultimately led to her martyrdom. In the Eastern Orthodox communion, her miracle is also celebrated according to that 11th century account. Churches in her honor have been erected in many places, such as the Church of Holy Martyr Euphemia in Istanbul, Turkey.

== Gallery ==
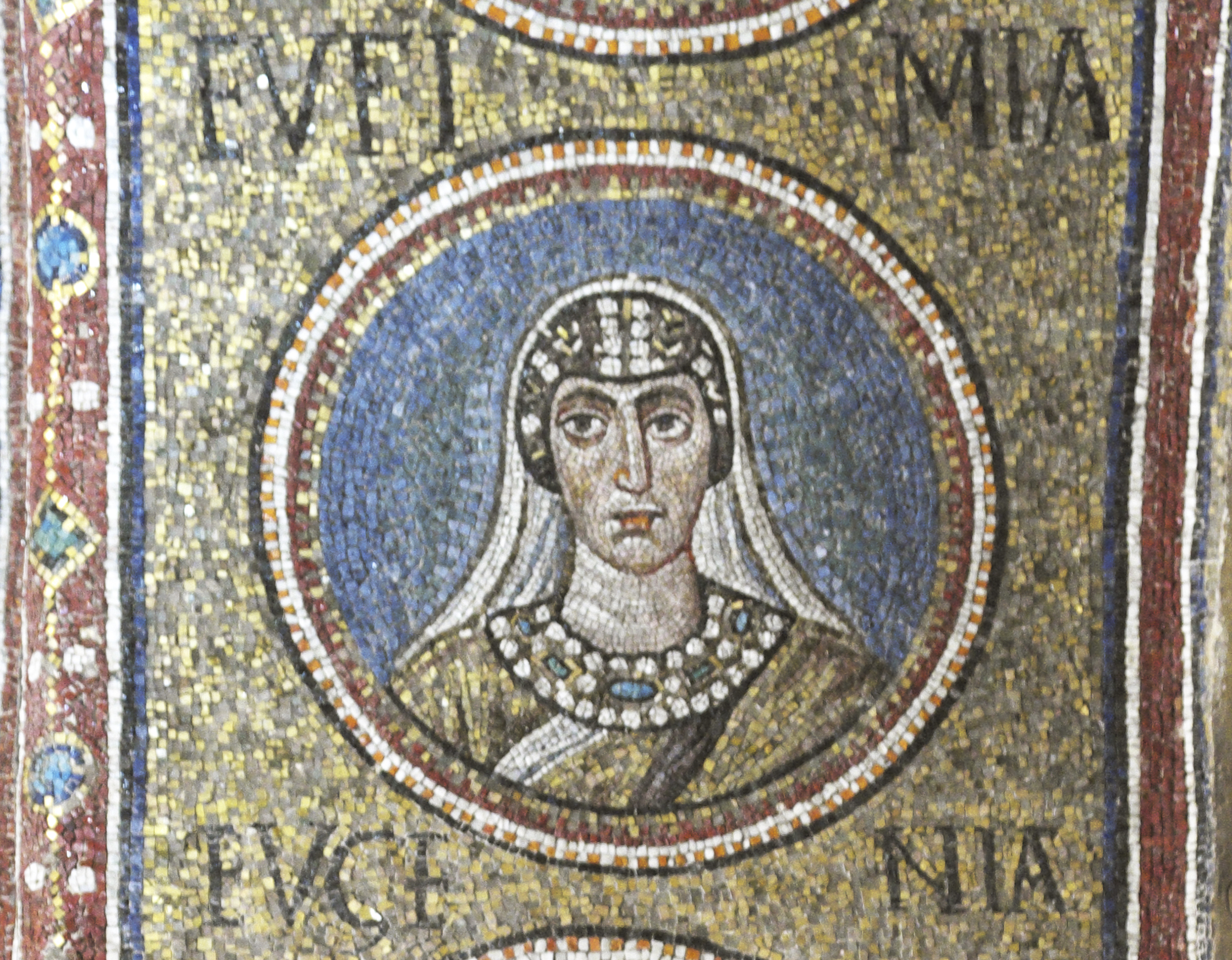
Mosaic from the Archbishop's Chapel in Ravenna

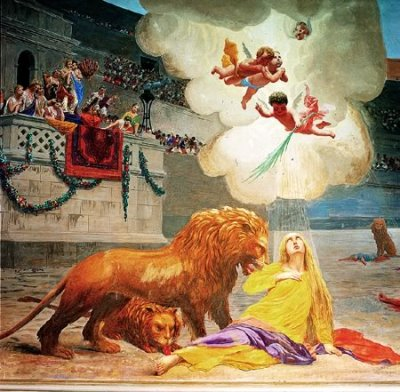
19th century mural depicting the martyrdom of St. Euphemia at the Church of St. Euphemia, Rovinj

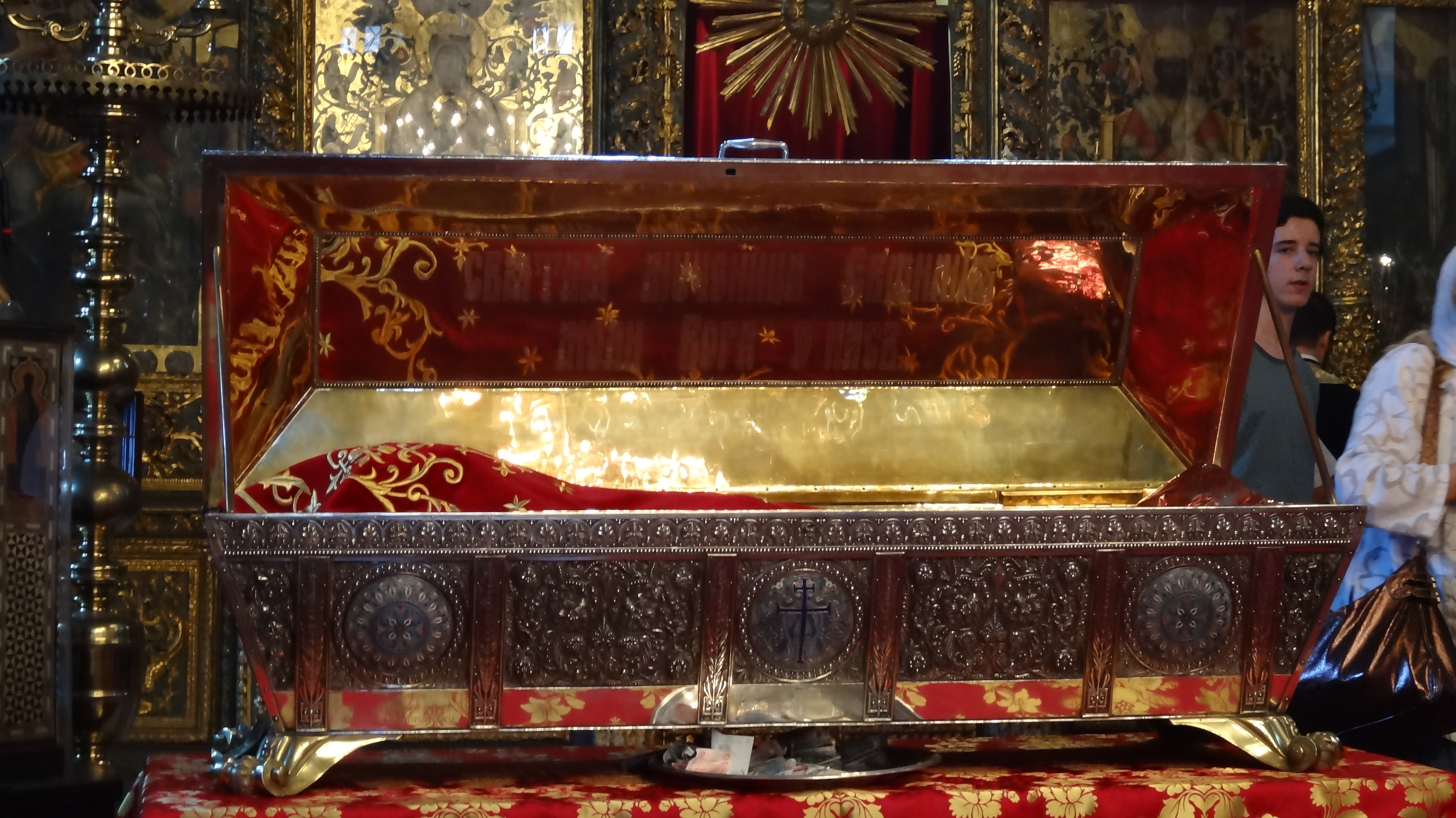
Russian-made reliquary of Saint Euphemia in The Patriarchal Cathedral Church of St. George, Istanbul

== See also ==
- Church of St. Euphemia, Rovinj
- 630 Euphemia - an asteroid named after St. Euphemia
