= Balbi's Arch =

Arch in Rovinj, Croatia

Coordinates: 45°04′55″N 13°38′03″E

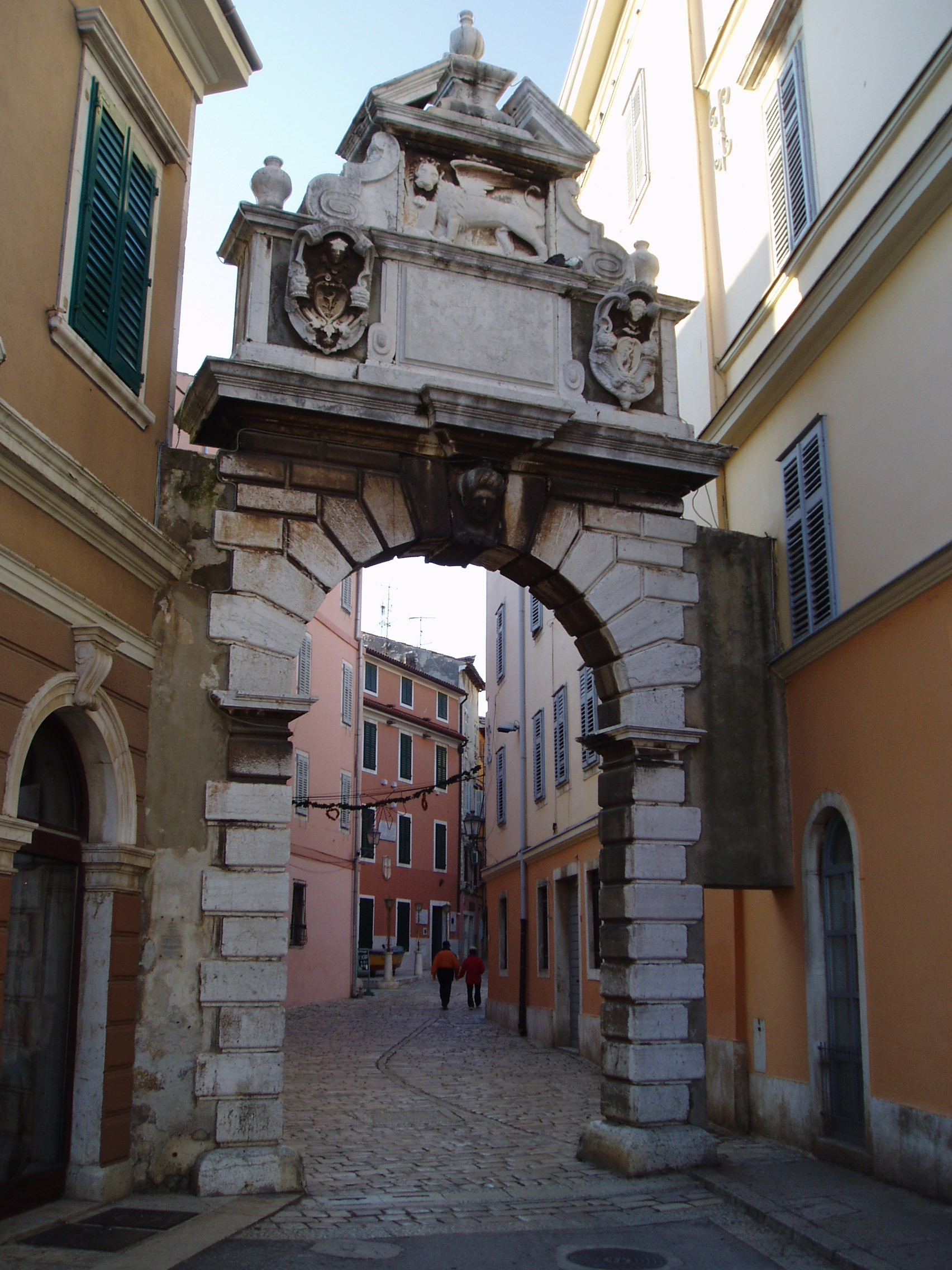
Balbi's Arch

Balbi's Arch (Croatian: Balbijev luk), in Rovinj, Croatia, was built in 1678–79. The arch leads to Grisia Street. On one side, there is the carved head of a Turk while on the other is the carved head of a Venetian. It stands on the site of the old town gate.
