= 630 Euphemia =

Main-belt asteroid

Discovery
- Discovered by: August Kopff
- Discovery date: 7 March 1907

Designations
- Pronunciation: /juːˈfiːmiə/
- Named after: Euphemia
- Alternative designations: 1907 XW; A924 DC
- Minor planet category: Main belt (Eunomia family)

Orbital characteristics
- Epoch 31 July 2016 (JD 2457600.5)
- Uncertainty parameter 0
- Observation arc: 91.87 yr (33557 d)
- Aphelion: 2.9153 AU (436.12 Gm)
- Perihelion: 2.3334 AU (349.07 Gm)
- Semi-major axis: 2.6244 AU (392.60 Gm)
- Eccentricity: 0.11086
- Orbital period (sidereal): 4.25 yr (1552.9 d)
- Mean anomaly: 273.57°
- Mean motion: 0° 13^{m} 54.588^{s} / day
- Inclination: 13.855°
- Longitude of ascending node: 105.419°
- Argument of perihelion: 40.148°

Physical characteristics
- Mean radius: 8.605±0.45 km 8.5 km
- Mean density: ~2.7 g/cm^{3}
- Synodic rotation period: 350 h (15 d)
- Geometric albedo: 0.2375±0.027
- Spectral type: S-type asteroid
- Absolute magnitude (H): 11.1

630 Euphemia is a mid-sized Eunomian asteroid.

Photometric observations at the Palmer Divide Observatory during 2005 showed a best fit rotation period of 79.18 ± 0.02 hours with a brightness variation of 0.2 ± 0.02 in magnitude. However, some uncertainty remains concerning the reliability of this result.
