= Rovinj =

Rovinj Ruvèigno / Ruveîgno (Istriot) Rovigno (Venetian and Italian)
- Town
- Grad Rovinj - Città di Rovigno; Town of Rovinj
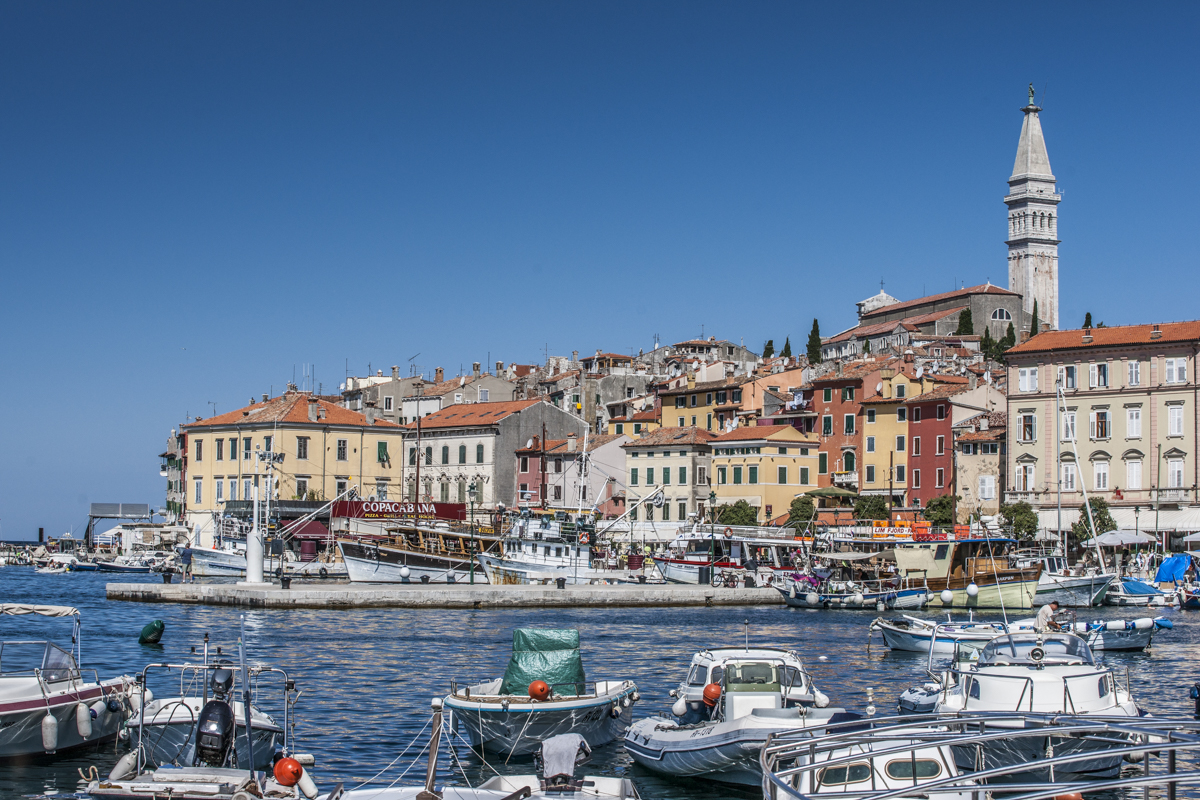
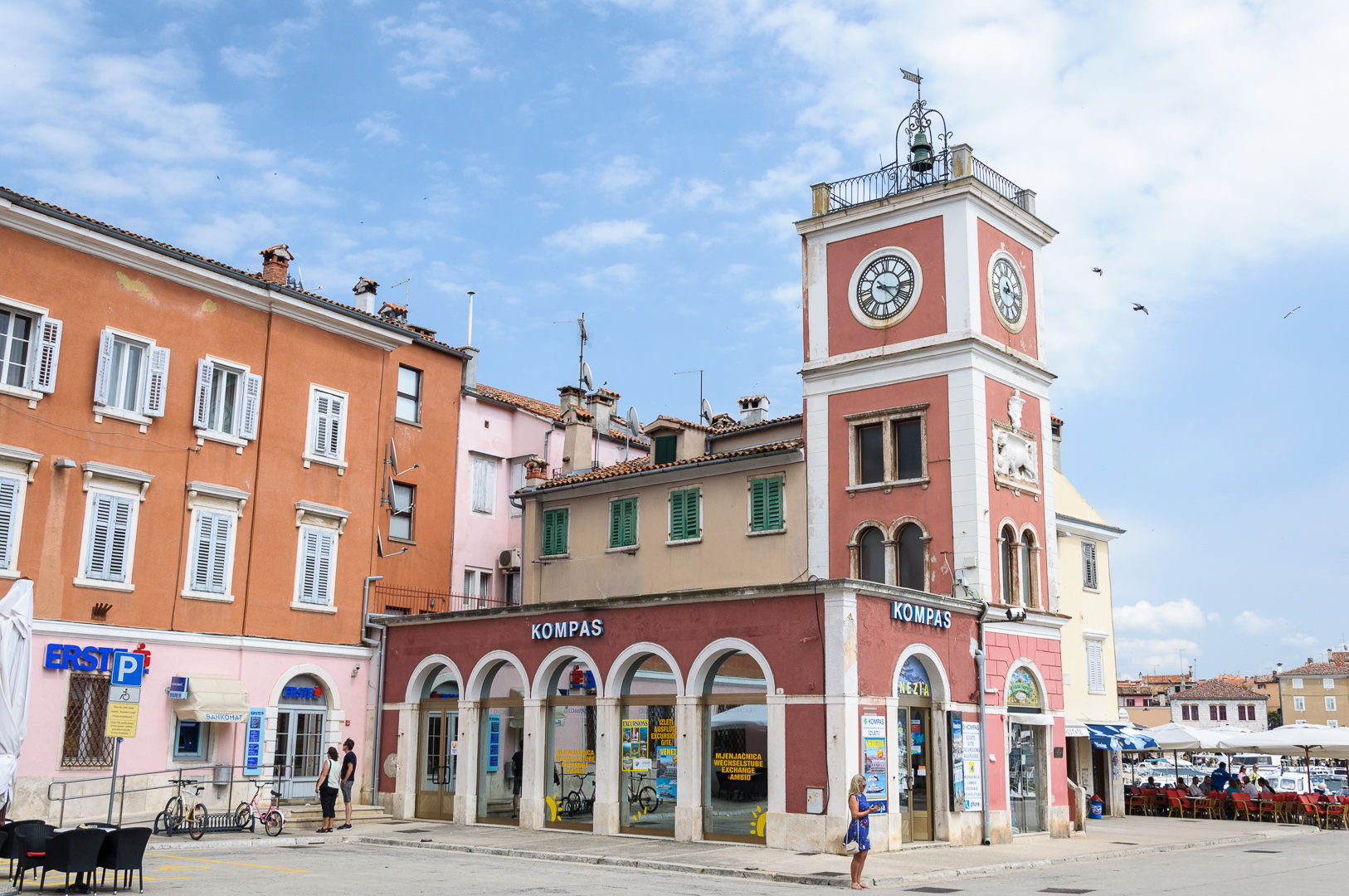
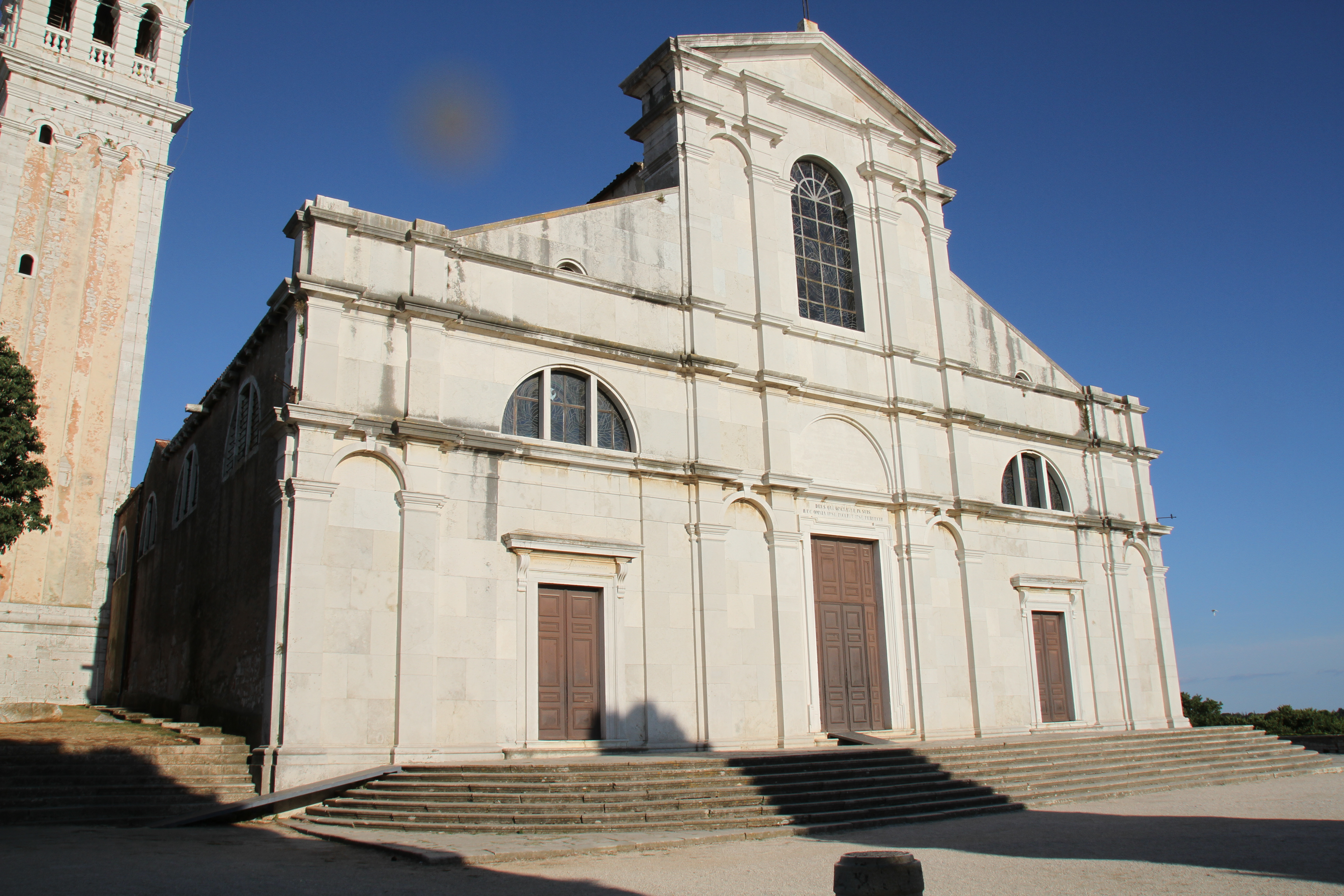
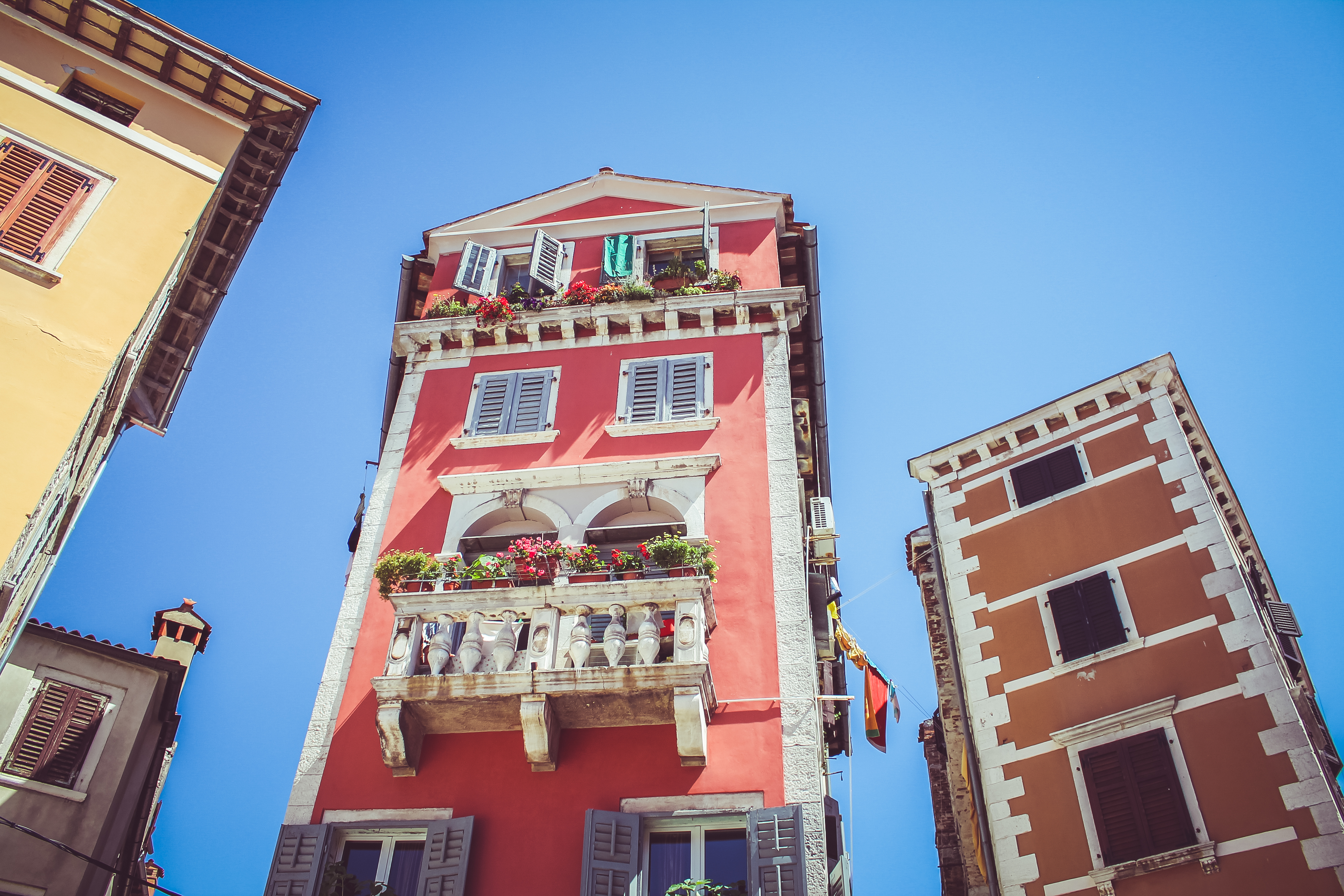
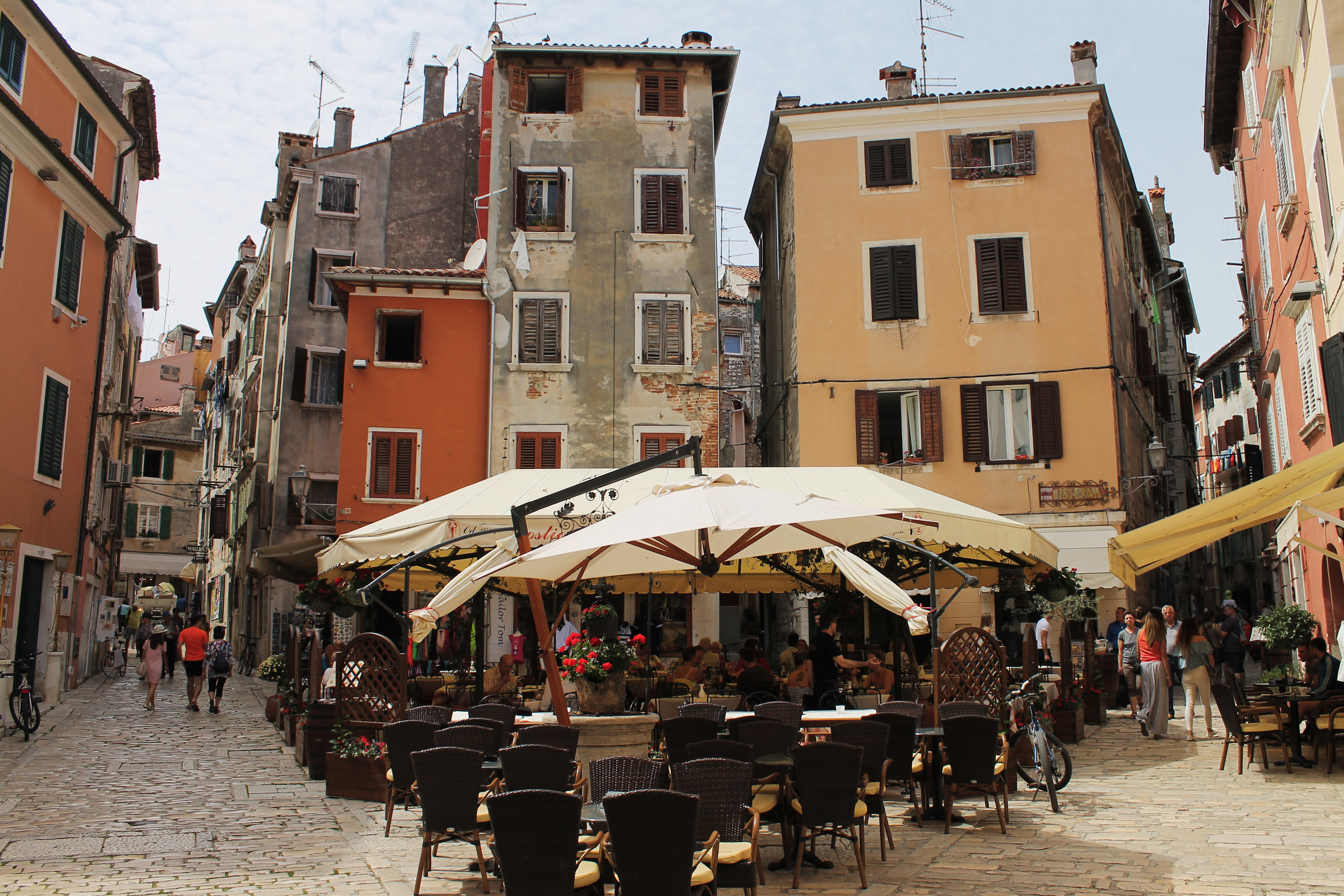
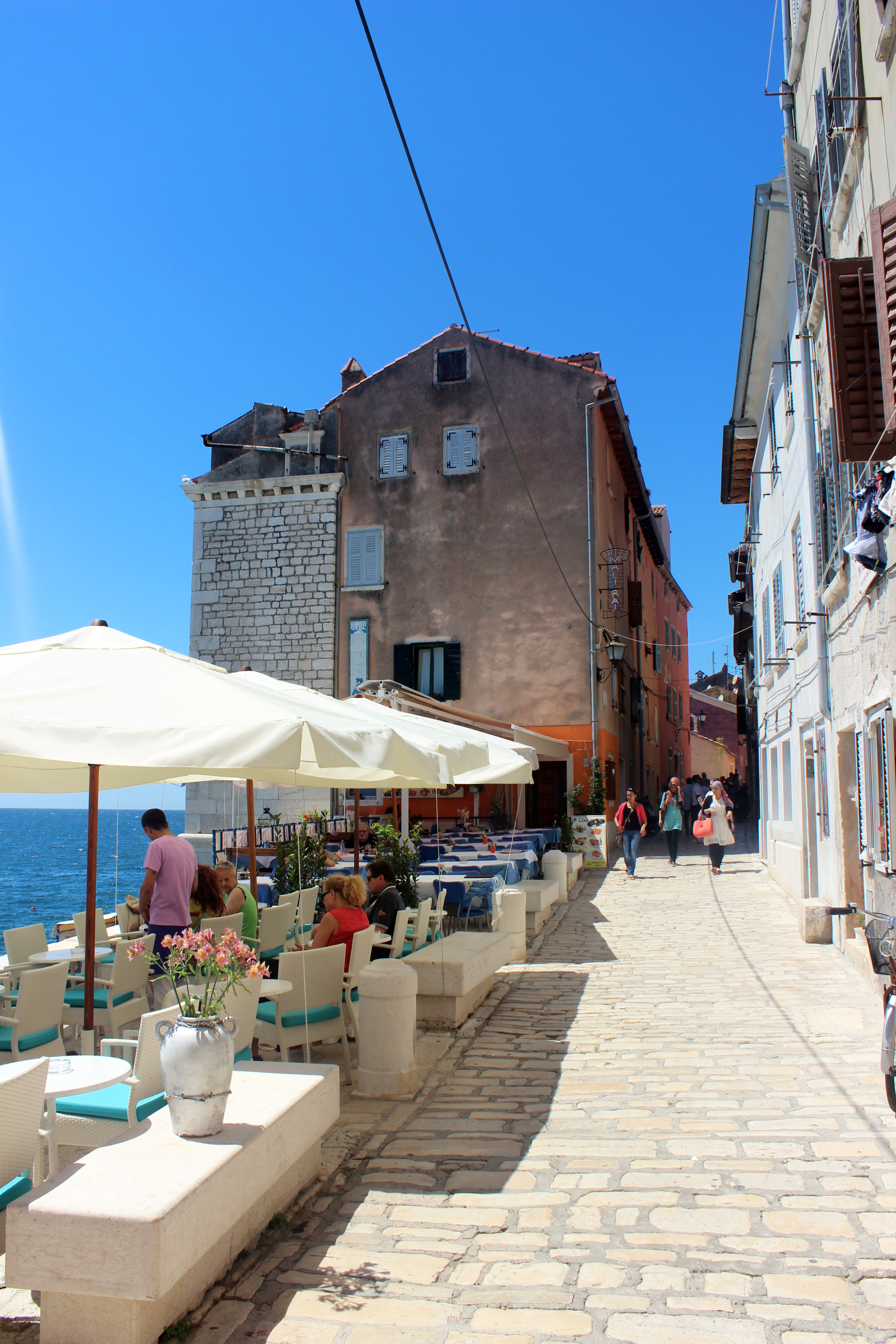
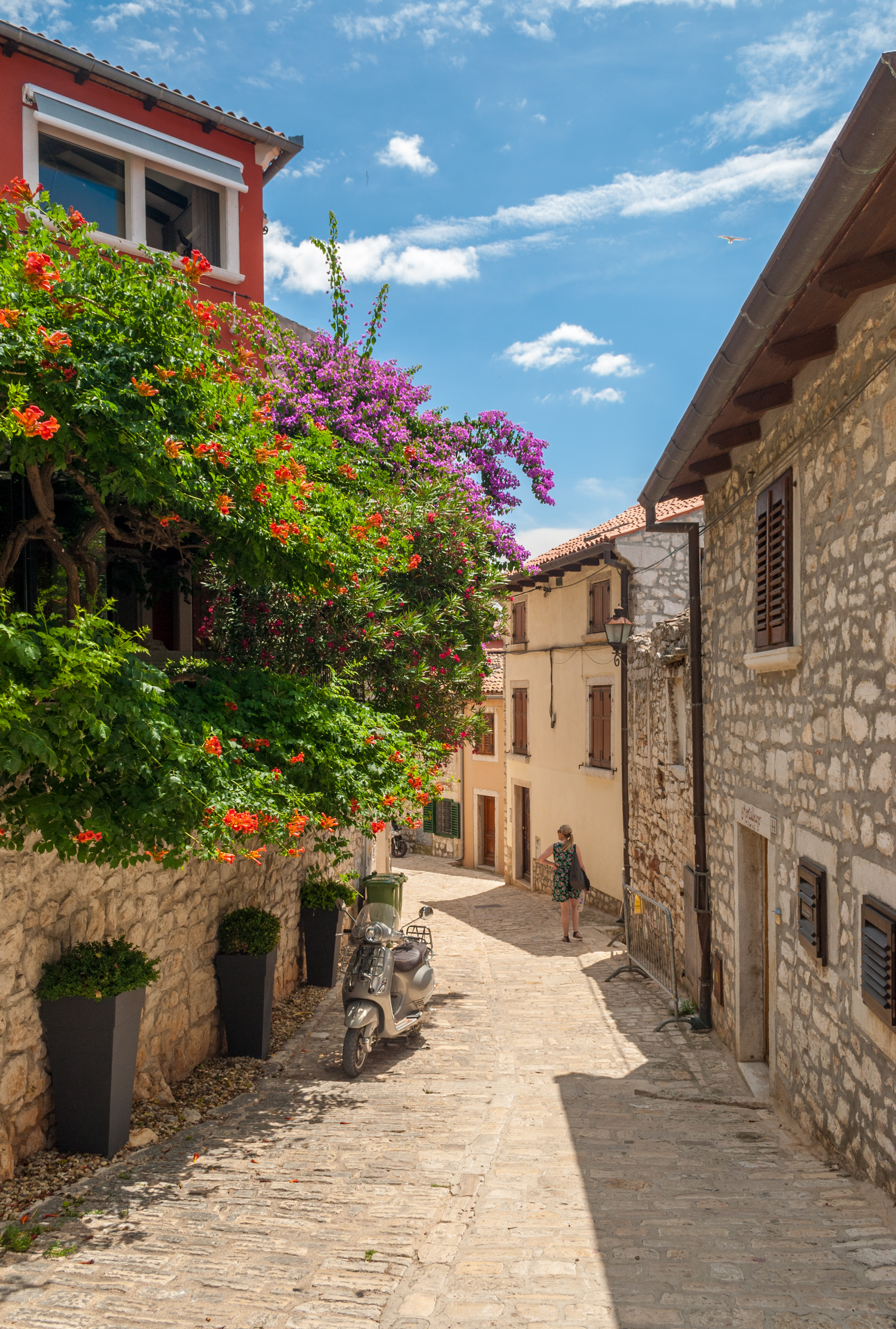
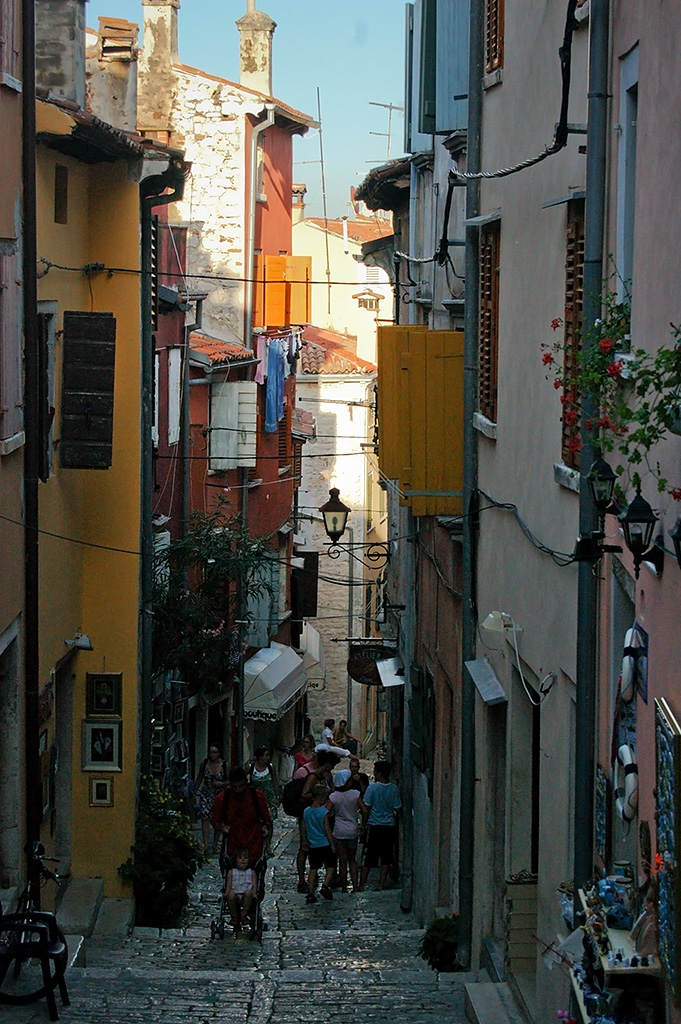
- Rovinj

- Flag Coat of arms

- Location within Croatia
- Coordinates: 45°05′N 13°38′E
- Country: Croatia
- Region: Istria
- County: Istria County

Government
  - Mayor: Emil Nimčević (IDS)
  - Town Council: 17 members: • IDS (11); • SDP (4); • HDZ (1); • ŽZ (1)

Area
  - Town: 77.5 km^{2} (29.9 sq mi)
  - Urban: 62.5 km^{2} (24.1 sq mi)
- Elevation: 0 m (0 ft)

Population (2021)
  - Town: 12,968
  - Density: 167/km^{2} (433/sq mi)
  - Urban: 11,629
  - Urban density: 186/km^{2} (482/sq mi)
- Time zone: UTC+1 (CET)
  - Summer (DST): UTC+2 (CEST)
- Postal code: 52210
- Area code: 052
- Website: rovinj-rovigno.hr

Rovinj (Croatian: [rǒviːɲ]; Venetian and Italian: Rovigno; Istriot: Ruvèigno or Ruveîgno; Ancient Greek: Ρυγίνιον, romanized: Rygínion; Latin: Ruginium) is a town in west Croatia situated on the north Adriatic Sea with a population of 12,968 (2021). Located on the western coast of the Istrian peninsula, it is a popular tourist resort and beach destination, in addition to being an active fishing port. Istriot, a Romance language once widely spoken in this part of Istria, is still spoken by some of the residents. The town is officially bilingual, Croatian and Italian, hence both town names are official and equal.

== History ==
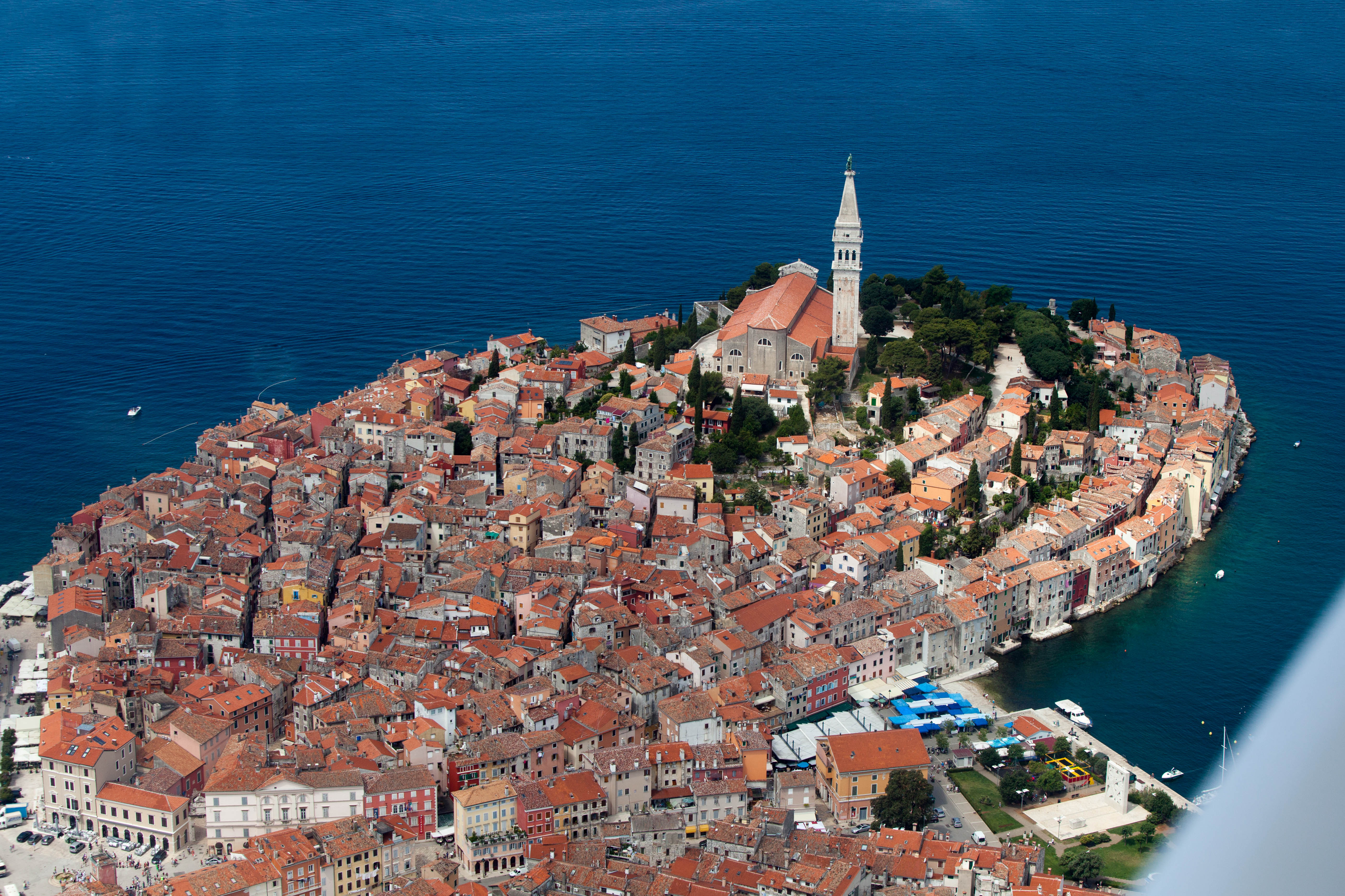
Rovinj old town, seen from the sky

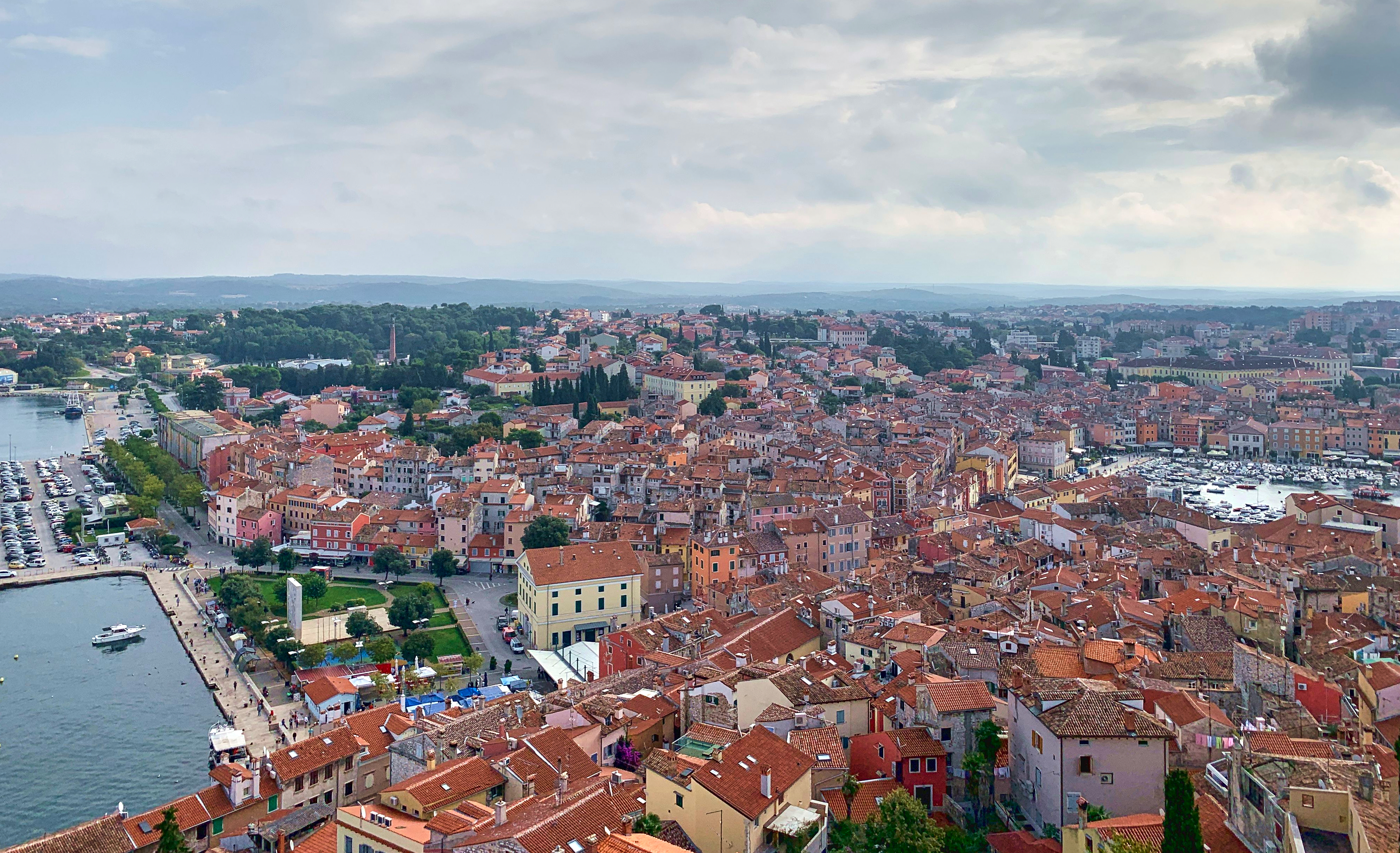
Rovinj, seen from Campanile of Saint Euphemia Church

Rovinj was already a settlement of Venetian or Illyrian tribes before being captured by the Romans, who called it Arupinium or Mons Rubineus, and later Ruginium and Ruvinium.

Rovinj was eventually incorporated into the Byzantine Empire, later becoming part of the Exarchate of Ravenna in the 6th century, before being taken over by the Frankish Empire in 788. For the following several centuries it was ruled by a succession of feudal lords, and in 1209 it was acquired by the Patriarchate of Aquileia under Wolfger von Erla.

From 1283 to 1797, Rovinj was one of the most important towns in Istria governed by the Republic of Venice. During this period, three town gates were constructed and Rovinj was fortified by two rows of defensive walls, remains of which can still be seen today. The Rovinj pier is home to one of the old town gates, Balbi's Arch, dating from 1680, and a late-Renaissance clock tower. The first town statute was proclaimed in 1531.

Rovinj, built on an island close to the coast, became connected to the mainland by filling in the channel only in 1763.

Following the fall of Venice in 1797 and the ensuing Napoleonic interlude, Rovinj became part of the Austrian Empire, which lasted until World War I. According to the last Austrian census in 1911, 97.8% of the population was Italian-speaking. Rovinj then belonged to Kingdom of Italy from 1918 to 1947, when it was ceded to SFR Yugoslavia, as part of SR Croatia. The original town name "Rovigno" was then changed to "Rovinj". During the post-war period, many Italian inhabitants left Rovigno, leading to significant changes in the town's demographic structure.

Following Croatia's independence in 1991, Rovinj became one of the most important centers of Istria County, an administrative unit encompassing most of Istria. Rovinj is today the third most populous town in the county, behind Pula and Poreč.

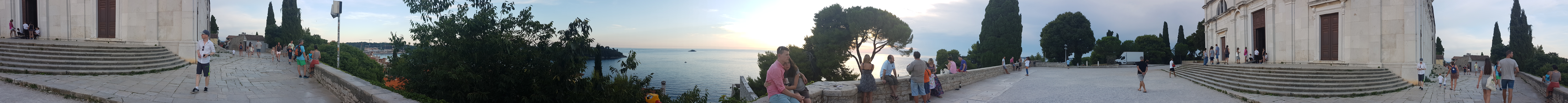
Panorama of Saint Euphemia square in Rovinj old town

== Climate ==
Rovinj is one of nine settlements officially designated as towns in Istria County in western Croatia. It has a humid subtropical climate (Köppen: Cfa), with an average temperature of 4.8 °C (40.6 °F) in January and 22.3 °C (72.1 °F) in July. The average annual temperature is 13.4 °C (56.1 °F). The sea temperature is more than 20 °C (68 °F) from the mid-June to September. The average annual sea temperature is 16.6 °C (61.9 °F). The average annual insolation is 2,437 hours, which means 134 sunny days a year. Rovinj is the 3rd sunniest town, hence town with the fewest cloudy days on the Adriatic.

Since records began in 1949, the highest temperature recorded at the local weather station was 37.1 °C (98.8 °F), on 2 August 1988. The coldest temperature was −14.8 °C (5.4 °F), on 7 January 1985.

Since records began in 1984, the highest temperature recorded at the Sveti Ivan na pučini weather station at an elevation of 8 metres (26 ft) was 34.2 °C (93.6 °F), on 5 August 2017. The coldest temperature was −6.5 °C (20.3 °F), on 29 December 1996.

From May to September Rovinj receives more than 10 sunshine hours a day. The rainfall averages 941 mm (37.05 in) a year and average air humidity is 72 percent.

Climate data for Rovinj
Month	Jan	Feb	Mar	Apr	May	Jun	Jul	Aug	Sep	Oct	Nov	Dec	Year
Record high °C (°F)	16.9 (62.4)	21.3 (70.3)	22.2 (72.0)	28.8 (83.8)	30.0 (86.0)	36.0 (96.8)	35.1 (95.2)	37.1 (98.8)	32.0 (89.6)	27.6 (81.7)	21.6 (70.9)	16.7 (62.1)	37.1 (98.8)
Mean daily maximum °C (°F)	9.6 (49.3)	10.6 (51.1)	13.4 (56.1)	16.7 (62.1)	21.7 (71.1)	25.4 (77.7)	28.5 (83.3)	28.7 (83.7)	24.6 (76.3)	19.9 (67.8)	14.4 (57.9)	10.8 (51.4)	18.7 (65.7)
Daily mean °C (°F)	5.3 (41.5)	5.5 (41.9)	8.1 (46.6)	11.5 (52.7)	16.4 (61.5)	20.1 (68.2)	22.8 (73.0)	22.4 (72.3)	18.4 (65.1)	14.2 (57.6)	9.6 (49.3)	6.5 (43.7)	13.4 (56.1)
Mean daily minimum °C (°F)	1.8 (35.2)	1.6 (34.9)	4.0 (39.2)	7.1 (44.8)	11.6 (52.9)	14.9 (58.8)	17.2 (63.0)	17.2 (63.0)	14.0 (57.2)	10.2 (50.4)	6.0 (42.8)	3.2 (37.8)	9.1 (48.4)
Record low °C (°F)	−14.8 (5.4)	−8.8 (16.2)	−10.0 (14.0)	−1.0 (30.2)	0.6 (33.1)	5.4 (41.7)	7.3 (45.1)	8.2 (46.8)	4.0 (39.2)	−1.5 (29.3)	−6.4 (20.5)	−9.4 (15.1)	−14.8 (5.4)
Average precipitation mm (inches)	59.5 (2.34)	50.3 (1.98)	55.0 (2.17)	63.3 (2.49)	56.4 (2.22)	72.1 (2.84)	40.7 (1.60)	64.5 (2.54)	83.1 (3.27)	97.0 (3.82)	98.3 (3.87)	71.2 (2.80)	811.5 (31.95)
Average precipitation days (≥ 0.1 mm)	8.8	7.4	8.1	10.5	9.7	9.0	5.8	6.6	7.9	9.8	10.0	8.5	102.0
Average snowy days (≥ 1.0 cm)	0.1	0.3	0.1	0.0	0.0	0.0	0.0	0.0	0.0	0.0	0.0	0.0	0.5
Average relative humidity (%)	82.1	78.9	75.7	74.6	74.5	70.7	67.7	70.3	76.3	79.6	80.4	81.1	76.0
Mean monthly sunshine hours	102.3	138.4	176.7	201.0	269.7	288.0	328.6	303.8	231.0	176.7	108.0	93.0	2,417.2
Source: National Meteorological and Hydrological Service (Croatia)

Rovinj sea temperature, 1961-1990
Month	Jan	Feb	Mar	Apr	May	Jun	Jul	Aug	Sep	Oct	Nov	Dec	Year
Average sea temperature	10.0 (50.0)	9.3 (48.7)	9.9 (49.8)	12.3 (54.1)	16.7 (62.1)	21.0 (69.8)	23.7 (74.7)	24.2 (75.6)	22.0 (71.6)	18.6 (65.5)	15.3 (59.5)	12.1 (53.8)	16.2 (61.2)
National Meteorological and Hydrological Service of Croatia

== Demographics ==
According to the 2021 census, Rovinj's population was 12,968, with 11,629 living in the town proper. The only other settlement in the municipality is Rovinjsko Selo. At the 2011 census it was 14,294 and 13,056 respectively.

Historical population
Year	Pop.	±%
1880	10,100	—
1890	10,354	+2.5%
1900	11,042	+6.6%
1910	13,160	+19.2%
1921	10,863	−17.5%
1931	11,069	+1.9%
1948	8,589	−22.4%
1953	6,374	−25.8%
1961	7,818	+22.7%
1971	9,464	+21.1%
1981	11,861	+25.3%
1991	13,559	+14.3%
2001	14,234	+5.0%
2011	14,294	+0.4%
2021	12,968	−9.3%
Source: Naselja i stanovništvo Republike Hrvatske 1857–2001, DZS, Zagreb, 2005

In the 2011 census, there were 14,294 people living in Rovinj municipality. Croats form the majority at 63.3%, while ethnic minorities include Italians (11.3%), those identifying with regional affiliation (10.5%), Serbs (4.2%), Albanians (2.7%) and Bosniaks (2.1%).

City of Rovinj: Population trends 1857–2021
v

population	9891	10063	10100	10354	11042	13160	10863	11069	8589	6374	7818	9464	11861	13559	14234	14294	12968
	1857	1869	1880	1890	1900	1910	1921	1931	1948	1953	1961	1971	1981	1991	2001	2011	2021

Sources: Croatian Bureau of Statistics publications

=== Language ===
Although the Government of the Republic of Croatia does not guarantee official Croatian-Italian bilinguialism, the statute of Rovinj itself does. Consequently, the town is officially bilingual and traditional Italian place names are preserved in accordance with the law on national minorities.

== Government ==
Rovinj is officially bilingual (Croatian and Italian) under Croatia's constitutional law on the rights of national minorities, reflecting the historic presence of the Italian community. The official name of the town is Grad Rovinj-Rovigno - Città di Rovinj-Rovigno, and both languages have equal status in administration, signage, and public documents.

The town is governed by a directly elected mayor (gradonačelnik / sindaco) and a town council (gradsko vijeće / consiglio cittadino) of 16 councillors elected to four-year terms. The council may exceed 16 seats when additional members are required to ensure proportional representation of the Italian national community under Croatian electoral law. Council membership is an honorary (unpaid) function. Local elections are held every four years alongside other Croatian local self-government units.

The Town Council adopts the town statute and budget, regulates municipal services and spatial planning, establishes town-owned companies and institutions, and elects its president and vice-president. The administrative seat is at Trg Matteotti / Piazza Matteotti 2.

== Economy ==
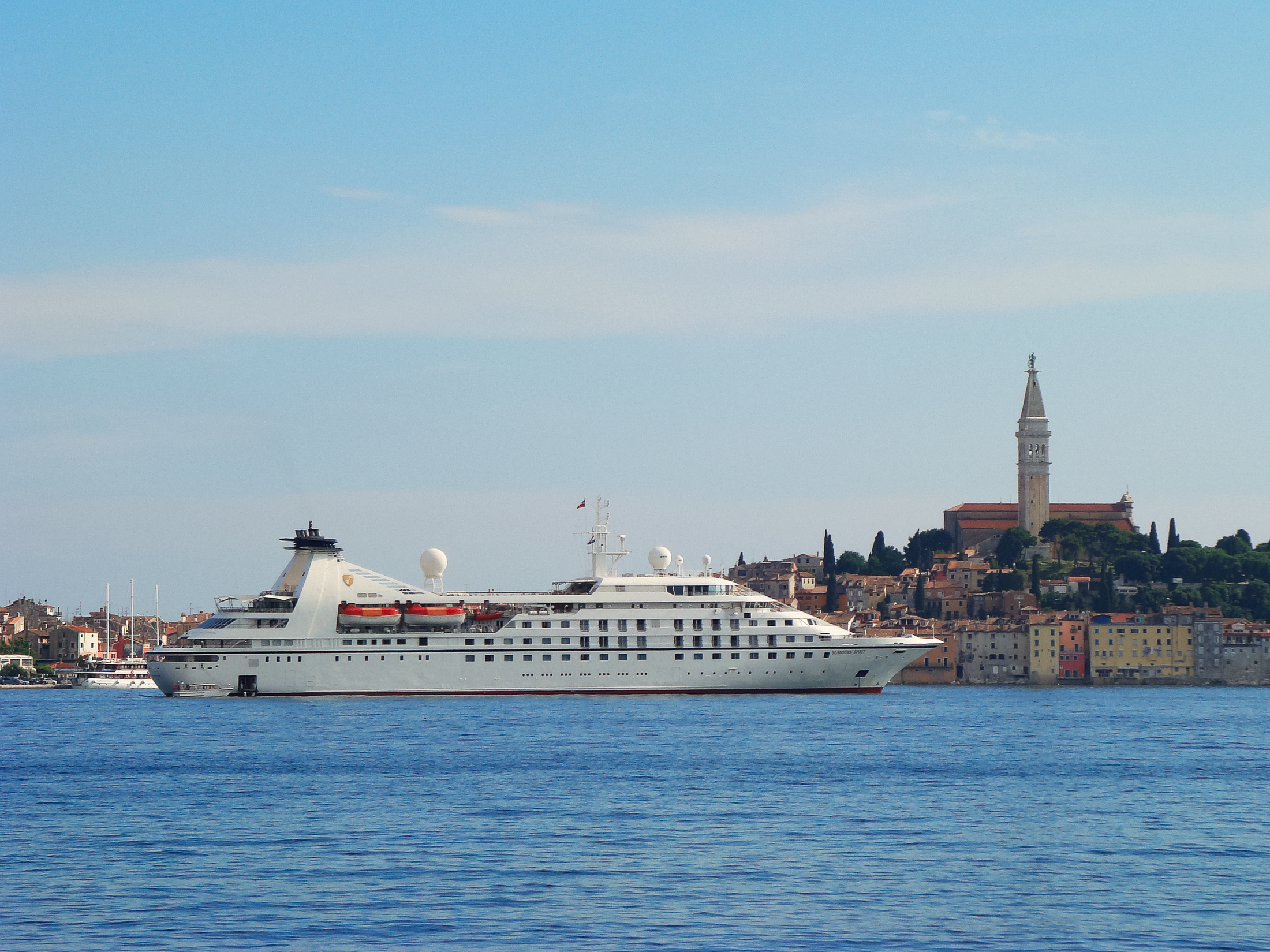
Star Breeze in Rovinj

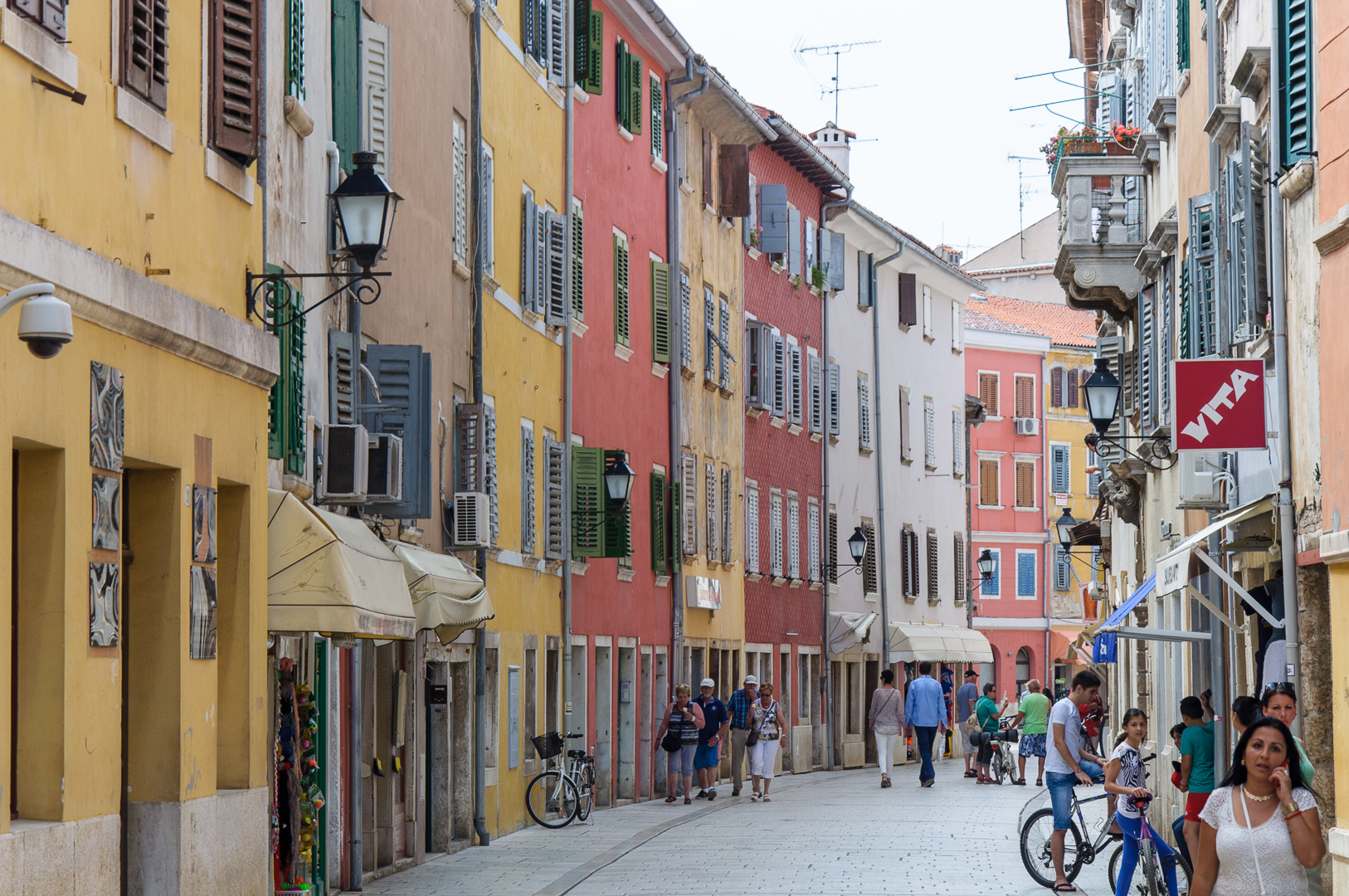
Houses in Carera Street

The main economic activity in Rovinj is tourism and during peak season (May–September), its bars, restaurants and art galleries work long hours, while operating limited hours off-season.

The busiest area is the very centre of Rovinj, extending from the main bus station towards the old part of town, where most bars and clubs are located.

The town's main central thoroughfare is the fully pedestrian Carera Street, with many independent shops and art galleries. A farmer's market is located at the edge of the historic part of town, near Valdibora Square.

According to data compiled by Istria Tourist Board, Rovinj is the second biggest tourist destination in the county, in terms of overnight stays. The two closest airports are in Pula (Croatia) and Trieste (Italy). During the summer season, low-cost airlines, such as Ryanair, operate direct flights from western Europe to both airports. Easyjet operates flights between cities in the United Kingdom and Pula in the summer months.

There are numerous hotels in the town itself, and beds are abundant though usually overbooked in the summer months. Accommodation ranges from private rooms or apartments to bungalows, camping sites and 2- to 5-star hotels. The town also has three luxury, 5-star hotels: Hotel Monte Mulini, Hotel Lone and Grand Park Hotel Rovinj, all owned by hotel group Maistra. Apart from hotels on the mainland, there are also a handful of hotels on small islands surrounding Rovinj which are linked to the mainland by boats which go from the town centre to the hotel on the islands.

== Sights and landmarks ==
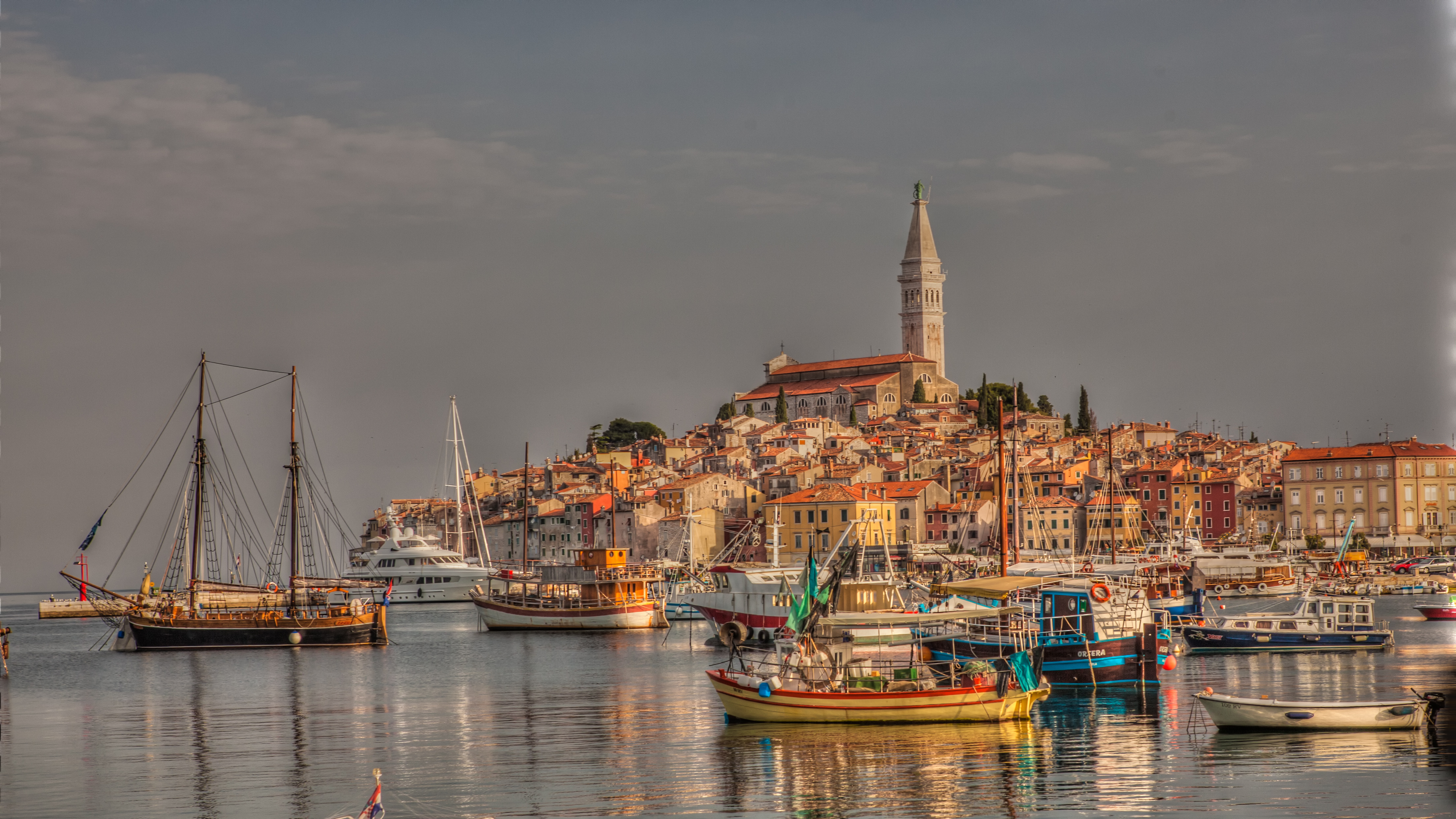
Rovinj at sunrise

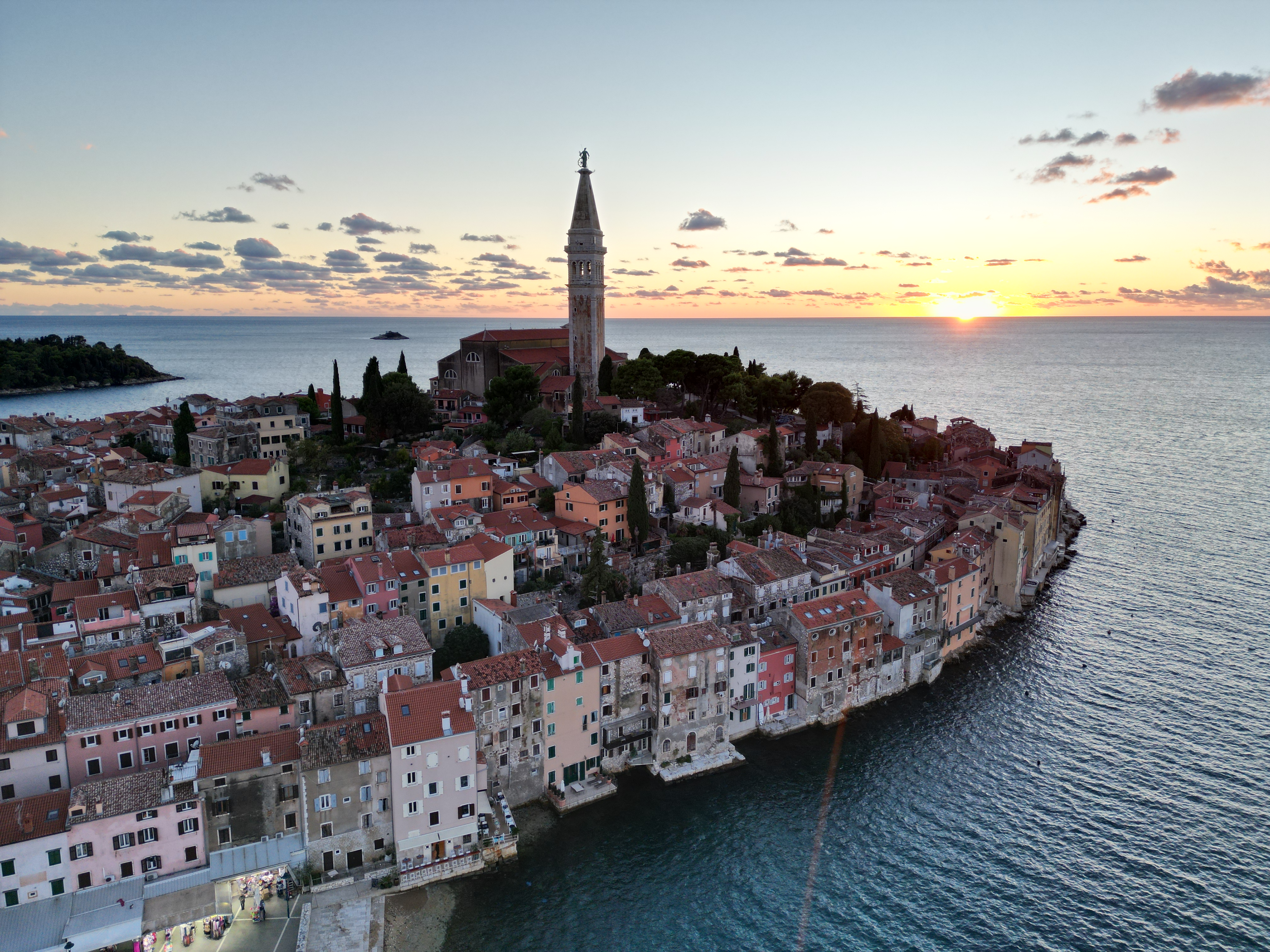
Rovinj at sunset

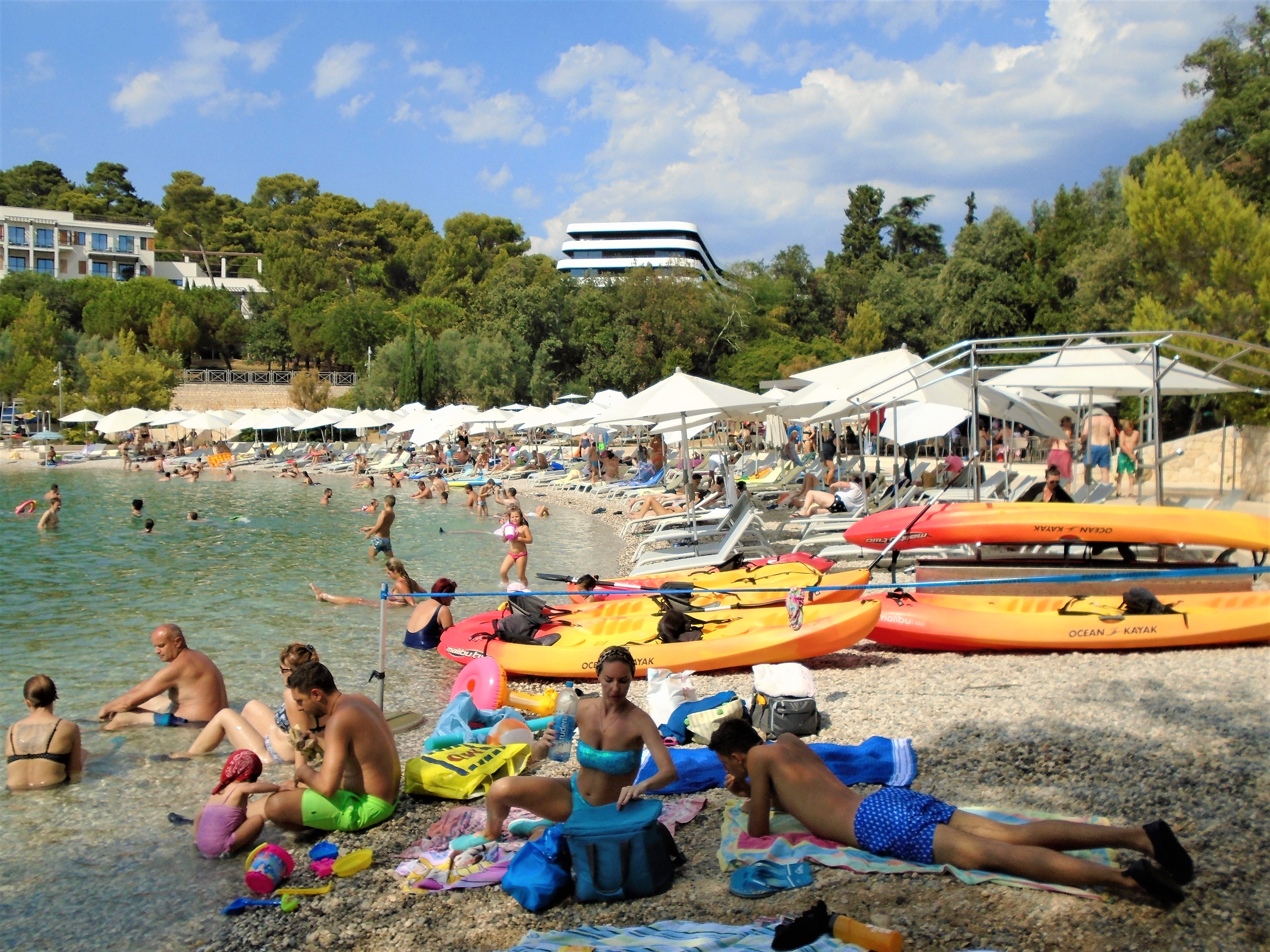
Mulini Beach

- Church of St. Euphemia
- Monkodonja
- Zlatni Rt Forest Park
- The Rovinj islands and mainland. These natural sights have been described as "outstanding scenic wonders," because of the pristine beauty of the indented coastline and its forests, consisting of holm oak and Alpine pine trees. This area "of outstanding natural beauty" extends from St. Ivan promontory to Barbariga, including all the Rovinj islands and the mainland 500 metres from the shore line. The Rovinj archipelago consists of 19 islands.
- Limska Draga
- The Palud marsh and the Dvije Sestrice Islands – The Dvije Sestrice (Two Sisters) islands are a nesting site for seagulls. Because of its thick holm oak forest, the Gustinja promontory is regarded as "a forest vegetation reserve."
- Rovinj Town Museum
- Casa della Batana (Kuća o batani) – a community ecomuseum in the old harbour dedicated to Rovinj's traditional flat-bottomed boat (batana) and the fishing community that built and used it. Inscribed on UNESCO's Register of Good Safeguarding Practices as a model for safeguarding living intangible cultural heritage.

=== Nature ===
The Lepidoptera of Rovinj includes Zygaena filipendulae zarana.

== Transportation ==
The most usual means of transport for getting around the Rovinj area is by car. Rovinj is connected to the A8 and A9 motorways in Kanfanar interchange by the D303 road, which connects it with the rest of Istria and with larger cities in the region such as Trieste, Venice, Rijeka, Ljubljana and Zagreb.

The centre of Rovinj, which includes the old town, is very walkable and travelling by bicycle or scooter is a popular means of getting around for many locals.

The closest commercial international airports are Pula (40 km (25 mi)), Rijeka (110 km (68 mi)), and Trieste (140 km (87 mi)). The closest major international airports are Venice and Zagreb. Car rental is available at each of the airports. During the summer season, Venice is connected to Rovinj via a direct ferry line which takes about 2.5 hours one way.

Rovinj is served by the Kanfanar railway station (15 km (9.3 mi)), which connects the region to Rijeka. However, travelling by bus is preferred to travelling by train due to the limited connections and schedules. The main bus station is located at the south-east end of Carera Street.

Between 1876 and 1966, Rovinj was connected to Kanfanar via a branch line of the Istriani Railway, which was closed supposedly due to heavy motorisation investments by Yugoslavia. Most of the tracks and stations, even though they have been sold by JŽ, can still be seen.

Also during the summer season, there is a direct high speed ferry link between Venice and Rovinj. High speed weekly lines to the Port of Ravenna and Cesenatico were also available in the summer season until 2012/13, when Emilia-Romagna lines, its operator, closed for insolvency.

== Education ==
Primary schools

- Juraj Dobrila – 8-year Croatian primary school.
- Vladimir Nazor – 8-year Croatian primary school.
- Bernardo Benussi – Scuola Elementare Italiana – 8-year Italian primary school.

Secondary schools

- Zvane Črnje – Croatian secondary (13–18) school.
- Strukovna Škola Eugena Kumičića – Croatian secondary (13–18) school for professional development.
- Scuola Media Superiore Italiana Rovigno (SMSIR) – Italian secondary school.

== Notable residents ==
- Giustina Abbà (1903–1974) partisan, anti-fascist and worker.
- Giuseppe Budicin (1911–1944) partisan and anti-fascist who gave his name to the Partisan Battalion Pino Budicin

Famous people from Rovinj:

Tony Cetinski, Mirko Cetinski, Lucky Luka,Antonio Gandusio, Bernardo Benussi

== Twin towns ==
Rovinj is twinned with:

- Adria, Italy (since 1982)
- Camaiore, Italy (since 1990)
- Leonberg, Germany (since 1990)
- Pesaro, Italy
