= Partisan Battalion Pino Budicin =

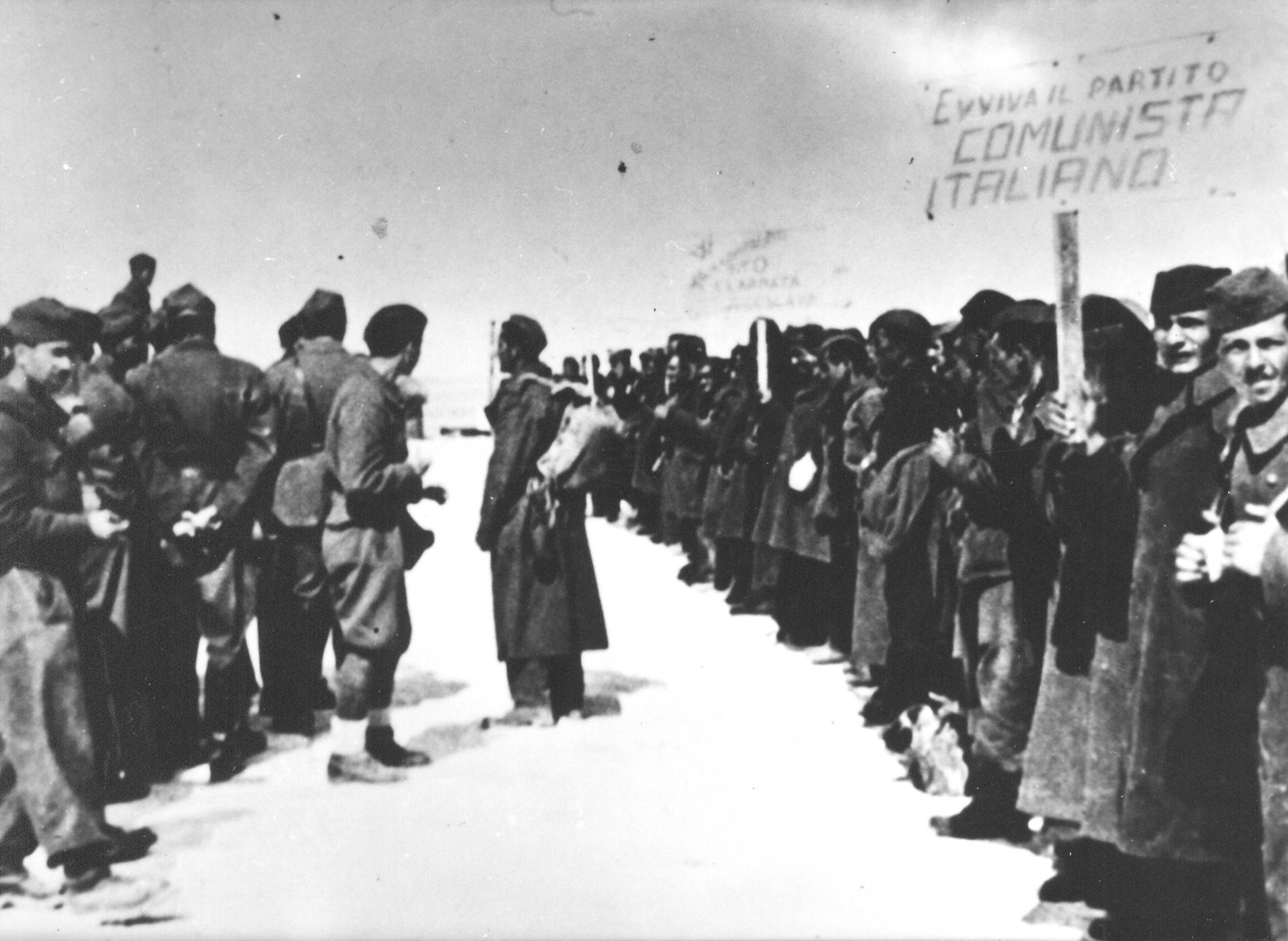
- Active: April 4, 1944–September 16, 1947
- Country: Eastern Italy, mainly former Italian Provinces of Pola, Fiume
- Allegiance: Yugoslav Partisan Army
- Type: Infantry
- Size: c. 400 (July 1944)
- Part of: Vladimir Gortan Brigade, 43rd Division of the 4th Army Corps of the Yugoslav Liberation Army

First Partisan battalion Pino Budicin was a military unit of the” Vladimir Gortan” Brigade, 43rd Division of the 4th Army Corps of the Yugoslav National Liberation Army during World War II. The battalion was almost entirely made up of Italians, most of them from the former Italian region of Istria.

== History ==
Initially formed as a company around mid-September 1943 the unit grew up until restructured and was granted the battalion status, during a small ceremony held at Stanzia Bembo, or Bembo farm, few miles away of Istrian village of Valle, on April 4, 1944; this was also the place of the first engagement of the newly endorsed unit. In fact that day during the ceremony the battalion was attacked by a German Unit. As first battalion's commander was appointed, Giuseppe Alizzi: a Sicilian from Giarre, a former Lieutenant of the Italian Army who had joined the Partisans after the Italian capitulation of September 8, 1943.

When reorganized as a battalion, the strength was about 120 officers and men, including some political commissars, in charge of the political control. The original three companies were: the 1st company, commanded by Milan Iskra, where Giorgio Pascucci was the Political Commissar; the 2nd company commanded by Nando Sacco, the political commissar was Benito Turcinovich, and the 3rd company commanded by (?) Deotto, whose political commissar was Riccardo Daveggia. All the mentioned commanders and commissars have been appointed with order n. 29 – 273/1944 issued on June 15, 1944, by the Partisan HQ of the People's Liberation Army of Yugoslavia. The battalion also included a semi-autonomous Commandos company led by the Popular Hero Matteo Benussi nicknamed Cio, and a supply platoon. A month later being turned into a battalion, its strength had risen up to 400 men. According to the partisan warfare, this number would have been enough for the creation of another battalion or even a new Partisan Brigade, following the example of the Partisan Assault Battalion Trieste turned into the new 20th Partisan Brigade Garibaldi-Trieste in April 1944, operating within the 9th Korpus. The 20th Partisan Brigade Garibaldi from May through December 1944 had the Partisan Battalion,” Alma Vivoda” also an ethnic Italian unit, that was operating in Capodistria area, under its direct control. However, for undisclosed reasons the creation of new Italian unit was not authorized by the senior Partisan authorities. A possible explanation may be that, an all-Italian-partisan-unit, organized as major tactical military formation, operating in the area would have been a possible future complication to the annexing plan of the Istrian area to the new Communist Yugoslavia. Therefore, to decrease the number, many Italian partisans who had joined the unit, were subsequently mustered to other non-ethic-Italian-partisan units; to mention one of them, the partisan Giusto CURTO a veteran of the Budicin Battalion. A peculiarity of the Pino Budicin Battalion was the use of the Italian language, for communication between rank and files, and with senior commands.

Because the majority of the unit was composed by Italians from Istria, most of them could not properly read and write, and in many cases even speak the Croatian language, the language spoken by almost all the partisan units in the Croatian area, and even those who spoke the language at home, had no full command of the written language; this mainly because the Fascist policy from 1920s onward had highly discouraged the use of non-Italian languages in the Istria and Krast areas, two of the territories annexed to Italy after the dissolution of the Austrian Empire which had a mixed population of Italians and Slavs. Orders were therefore given in Italian as well as the communication with senior commands. This fact is mentioned in a letter of IX Yugoslav Army Corps (IX Corpus) dated April 23, 1944. The same letter also remarked the poor training of the Battalion Officers, and the lack of efficient equipment and weapons, most of it coming from the looting of the Italian Army posts after its dissolution on September 8, 1943.

== The origin of the name ==
The battalion, ”Pino Budicin” was named after the communist activist, and Yugoslav Popular Hero, Giuseppe Budicin nicknamed Pino; born on April 27, 1911, in Rovigno d’Istra, a small city on the Istrian coast then under Austria-Hungary, passed at the end of World War I under the Italian sovereignty. At the age of 21, Pino Budicin then a barber, was drafted into the Italian Armed Forces, and served in the Italian Royal Navy at the naval base of La Spezia from 1931 to 1933; it was during this period that his communist activity was noted by the military authority. At the end of his military obligation Pino BUDICIN went back to his native city. Between 1933 and 1943, he was arrested many times for his activity within the Italian Communist Party. Released in August 1943 from the Castelfranco Emilia prison, where he had been confined after the last arrest, he returned to his native city, where he immediately resumed his clandestine activity, organizing communist cells in town and in the surrounding area. On September 8, 1943, after the Italian Radio had broadcast the term of the Armistice between Italy and the allied forces, he quickly acted addressing locals in the city's main square, and organizing the uprising in Rovigno. When the German army retook the city, few weeks later, he moved out of town, and together with his comrades, actively joined the partisans. Slightly wounded after a small engagement he was captured on February 7, 1944, around “Santa Brigida” with another partisan, Augusto FERRI, a former Italian Army Commissioned Officer, also known as the, ”Bolognese”, and together with him executed by the firing squad, the day after at the Valdibora Harbor in Rovigno. As he was going to be shot, Budicin defiantly, shouted to the firing squad, ”out of every drop of my blood, hundred partisans!”. After the war the local authorities erected a bust on his memory naming Pino BUDICIN on September 26, 1973, a, ”Popular Hero”. At the time of his death, Pino BUDICIN was the Secretary of the Communist Party in the Rovigno area, and the local representative to the National Anti-Fascist Council of the People's Liberation of Croatia or ZAVNOH.Augusto Ferri was born in Bologna, Italy, in 1914. A militant communist from his youth, during Fascism he was arrested and served few years of confinement for political crimes. As WW2 broke out he was reactivated into the Royal Italian Army, and took part in the occupation of Yugoslavia in 1941. During his service with the Italian Army he secretly collaborated with the Yugoslav partisans. In January 1943 he deserted the army and joined the Communist Resistance, who sent him to Rovinj, and from autumn 1943 he actively cooperated with Budicin in organizing the local clandestine Communist Party. However, in his 1995 autobiography, “ Nemico del Popolo” (A People's Enemy) Antonio Budicin, Pino's brother, gives another account regarding the arrest of Pino Budicin and Augusto Ferri, affirming that they were betrayed by a Croat communist, when with a ruse they were sent back to the spot of a previous engagement with the local Fascist militia. When the two arrived there they found the Fascist militia, recovering the bodies of their fallen comrades, and were arrested.

== Actions 1944-1945 ==
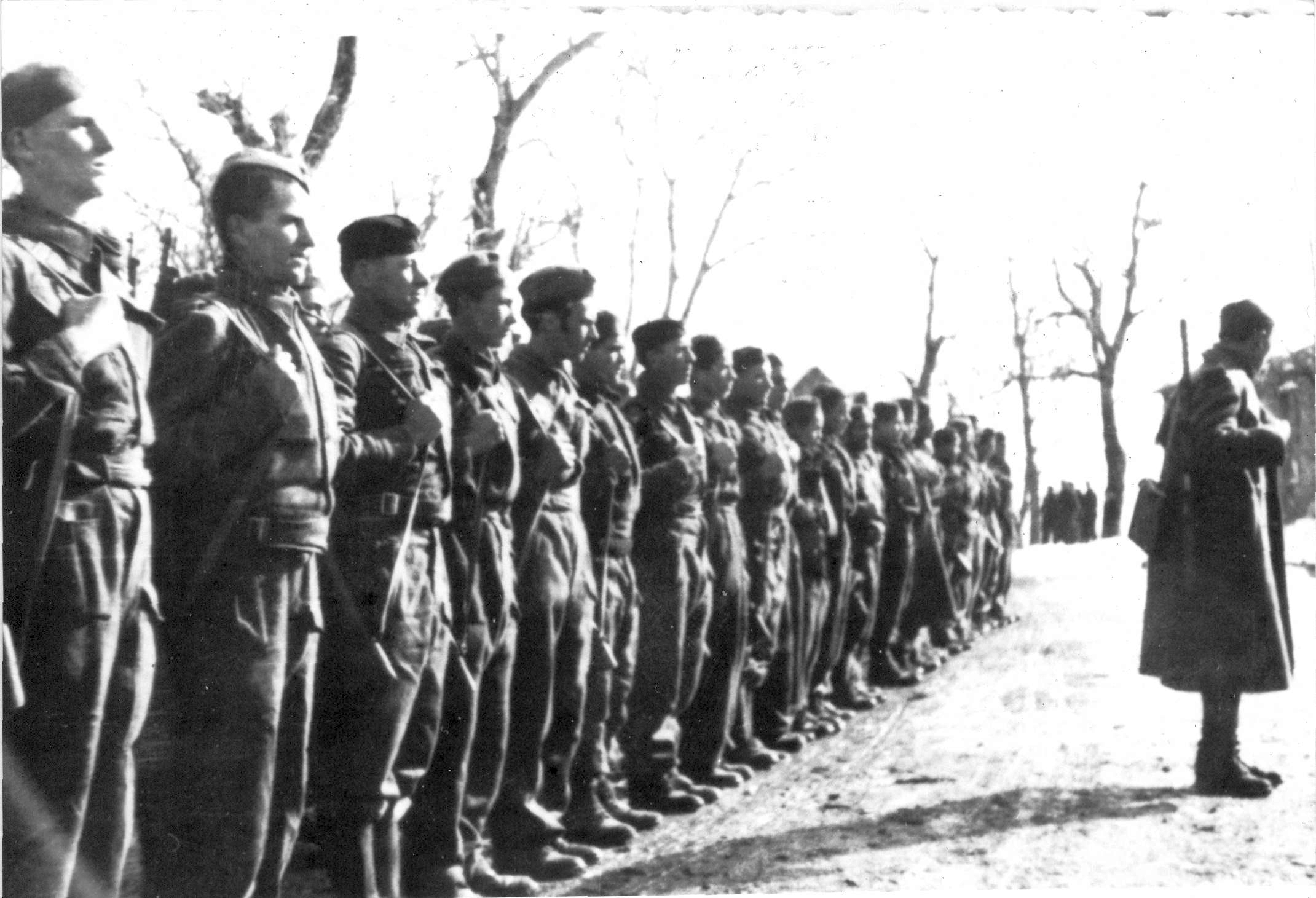
Review of the Italian Battalion Pino Budicin near Vrbovsko in Gorski Kotar, before the battle at Ogulin in 1944.

The battalion saw action mainly in the territory comprised in, the Istrian Peninsula and Karst Plateau, the former Italian eastern provinces of Fiume and Pola, and was involved in many engagements, against German and Italian Republican Fascist forces and took part the battle of Gumanac, nearby Snežnik, at the battle of Klana and at the battle of Stazia Camus near Pazin. The battalion also fought against the Croatian Ustaše in the Ogulin area. During the night of April 29, 1945, the battalion joined the other Gortan Brigade Units at Erjavce, and through Slivjia marched down by the,” Camionale road” towards Trieste. On its way to the city the battalion was engaged in a fight by German forces. Its vanguard made contact with the 20th Dalmatian Partisan Division around Kozina. At this point the Battalion's commander Milan Iskra asked his seniors the permission to join the forces that were marching down to Trieste, but this request was turned down. However four battalion members were attached to other Partisan forces and entered with them in Trieste on May 1, 1945. Instead the BUDICIN battalion received orders to move back to Istria, and was among the first units entering in Pola, now Pula in Croatia, on May 8, 1945.

== After the war and dissolution ==
When US and British forces landed in Pula on June 12, 1945, to establish the United Nations administration the battalion withdrew on the Demilitarization line running from Medulin - Valtura - Galižana - Vodnjan, and was subsequently garrisoned as occupation force in the city of Fiume, now Rijeka in Croatia. The unit left Fiume at the beginning of 1947 and was sent to Poreč on the Istrian Coast, and established its headquarters at Plava Laguna. Shortly afterwards the Battalion was mustered back to Rovinj again. The unit was officially disbanded on September 16, 1947, after the effects of the Paris Treaty who had transferred Istria and the Italian Dalmatia to Yugoslavia.

== Legacy ==
The first Battalion commander Giuseppe Alizzi survived the war, and returned to his native city of Giarre in Sicily. There he became a well-known communist local leader. He died in September 1991.

Giusto Curto (1909-1988), a veteran in the Budicin's Battalion who was later assigned to the 2nd Battalion, 1st Brigade of the 13th Partisan division, after the war became a poet, and a writer in local Rovignese dialect, and lived until his death in his native Rovigno.

Benito Turcinovich, was the Political Commissar of the second company; after the war he migrated to Italy and was listed as an anti-communist refugee, as well as many other Italian communists from Yugoslavia, after Tito severed ties with Stalin's Soviet Union.

Major Bruno Tomini, the last battalion commander suffered a worse fate. Born in 1918, the son of a metal worker, after a brief experience as a school teacher during which, he said, he was ill-treated by Fascist Party members due to his communist ideas, at the outbreak of World War II he enlisted the Italian Army and was commissioned from the Army Officer School of Fano a second Lieutenant. At the outbreak of the War with Yugoslavia, he was deployed along with his Regiment, the 94 Infantry “Messina”, in the Balkan area. In 1942 he deserted and joined the partisans and assigned to the XIII Partisan Division in Gorski Kotar. When Italy signed the armistice with the allied powers on September 8, 1943, he was quickly mustered to the Histrian area to help organizing the new partisan units formed after the Italian surrender. For a long period he was the battalion's Chief of Operations. In 1948, when Marshal Tito severed ties with Moscow, Bruno TOMINI was one of the 50,000 Yugoslavs that because of their loyalty to the International and Soviet communism, were incarcerated at Goli Otok island prison opened in 1949. There under harsh conditions and humiliations, many of them did not return to their homes.

Orlando Garlato was the first fallen of the battalion, while Arnaldo De Franceschi, born 1928, was the last one to fall on May 6, 1945, around Pazin in Istria.

Domenico,” Uccio” Medelin a veteran of the Battalion, left the active service in the Yugoslav People's Army in 1965 with the rank of Major.

== Battalion commanders 1944-1947 ==
- Giuseppe Alizzi until June 6, 1944;
- Oskar Turilli until June 11, 1944;
- Giorgio Tomini until September 17, 1944
- Arinaldo Demartini, acting commander and then commander from September 21, 1944, until March 1, 1945;
- Major Bruno Tomini until September 16, 1947.

== Casualties and losses ==
The casualties suffered by the Pino Budicin Battalion can only be approximately determined as the battalion archives went lost at least three times during the war. However, on June 28, 1945, while addressing people in Fiume, the then battalion's Political Commissar Mario Jedreicich mentioned these figures; 75 men killed in action, 150 men wounded, and 120 missing in action. On June 6, 1946, the last battalion's commander, Bruno Tomini, during an interview released at the Fiume/Rijeka newspaper, La Voce del Popolo declared that the battalion losses were as follow; 100 men killed in action, 120 wounded and 80 men missing in action.

== Awards ==
As recognition of valor in action the Partisan Battalion Pino BUDICIN, on April 4, 1945, was rewarded with the war flag, the Italian flag defaced with the red communist star.

During the years of service more than 200 Battalion's members were awarded with decorations, many of them with the Yugoslav Medal of Valor.

After the war the battalion was also awarded with a permanent display at the Civic museum of Rovigno, to show to the new citizens of Yugoslavia the contribute that the Italians had given to war against the Fascist and Nazis tyranny in the area. A few years later the permanent display was disbanded to be briefly restored only in 1974 at the thirstiest anniversary of the Battalion foundation. The present day Italian council of Rovigno had hopes to restore the permanent display as it was in its origin.
