= Jirōmaru Station =

Metro station in Fukuoka, Japan

Coordinates: 33.5525°N 130.3297°E

N02 Jirōmaru Station 次郎丸駅
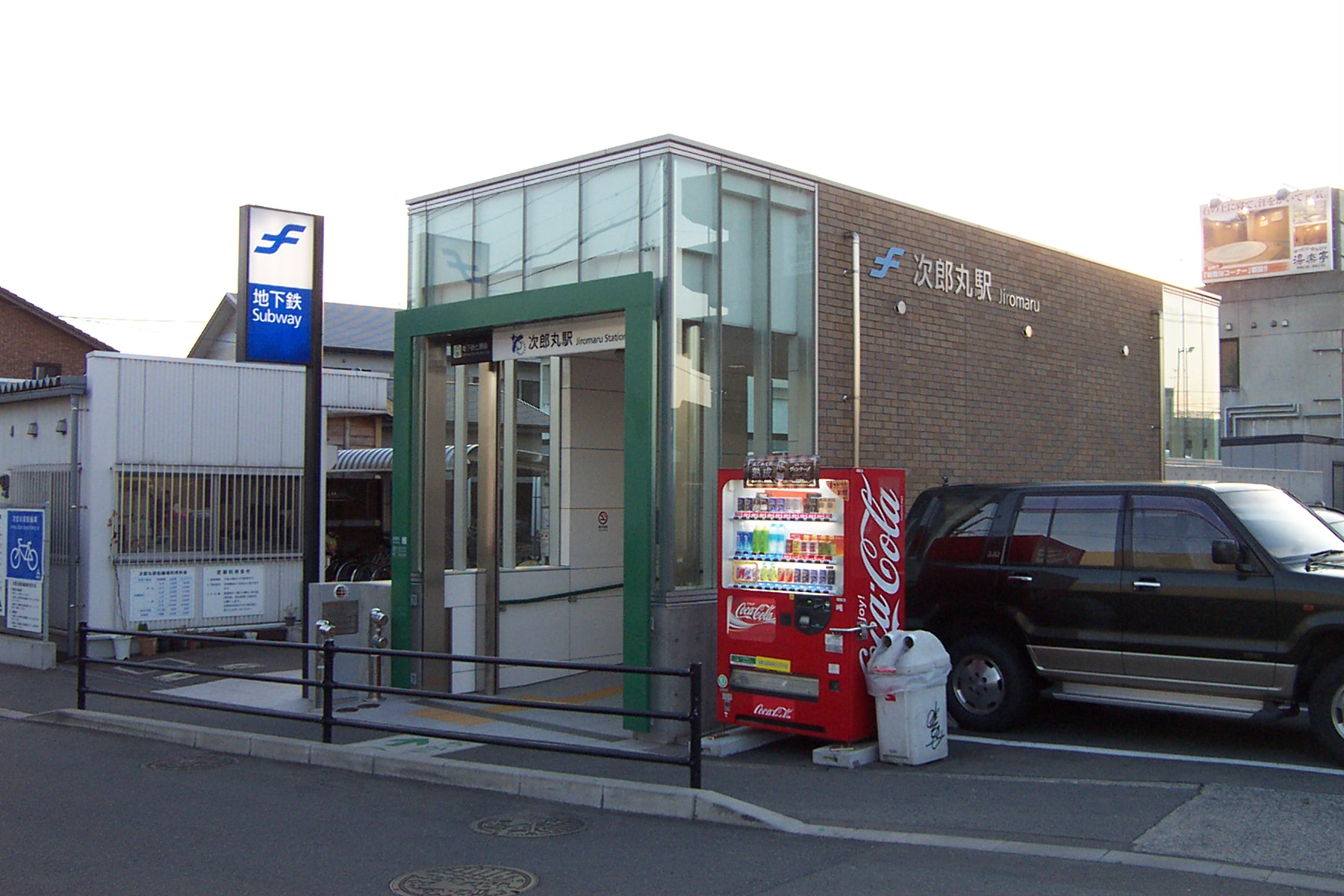

General information
- Location: Sawara, Fukuoka, Fukuoka; Japan
- System: Fukuoka City Subway station
- Operator: Fukuoka City Subway
- Line: Nanakuma Line

Other information
- Station code: N02

History
- Opened: February 3, 2005; 21 years ago

Passengers
- 2006: 1,762 daily

Services
| Preceding station | Fukuoka City Subway | Following station |
|---|---|---|
| Hashimoto N01 Terminus | Nanakuma Line | Kamo N03 towards Hakata |
Location

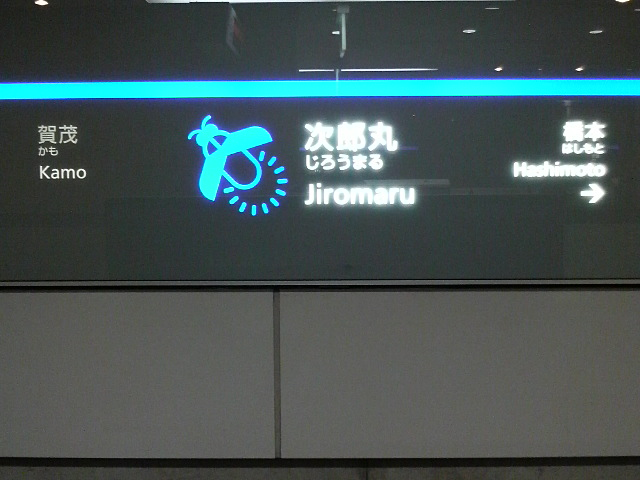
Station symbol

Jirōmaru Station (次郎丸駅) is a subway station on the Fukuoka City Subway Nanakuma Line in Sawara-ku, Fukuoka in Japan. Its station symbol is a firefly in blue, representing the nearby Muromi river.

== Lines ==
- Fukuoka City Subway
  - Nanakuma Line

== Platforms ==
| 1 | ■ Nanakuma Line | for Hakata |
| 2 | ■ Nanakuma Line | for Hashimoto |

== Vicinity ==
- Fukuoka College of Health Sciences
- Fukuoka Dental College
- Roman bathhouse
- Starbucks
- Super Hallo Day Store
- Tsutaya (Culture Convenience Club Co.)

== History ==
- February 3, 2005: Opening of the station
