= EFIS (disambiguation) =

EFIS may refer to:

- electronic flight information system
- École Franco-Indienne Sishya, Adyar, Chennai, India; a French international school
- Estonian Foreign Intelligence Service
- Estonian Film Database (EFIS), part of the Estonian Film Foundation
- European Federation of Immunological Societies, publisher of the European Journal of Immunology

== See also ==
- FIS (disambiguation)
- EFI (disambiguation)
- FI (disambiguation)
