= Exposome-NL =

Exposome Research Programme in the Netherlands

- Established: 2020
- Purpose: Research
- Headquarters: Utrecht, Netherlands
- Budget: € 26 million
- Website: Website Exposome-NL

Exposome-NL is a 10-year Dutch research program of multiple Dutch universities collaborating in the field of exposome research. Researchers from fields such as exposure science, environmental science, cardiovascular and metabolic health, clinical epidemiology, nutritional epidemiology, geosciences, agent-based modelling, molecular biology, chemistry and bioinformatics, ⁣and biostatistics work together within the Exposome-NL research program.

In 2019, the program was awarded funding of 17.4 million euros through a Gravitation program of the Dutch Research Council. The participating institutes contributed an additional 8 million euros to the program. The national Exposome-NL research program, led by Prof. Roel Vermeulen, started in January 2020.

== Research Lines ==
The scientific research of Exposome-NL is organised in three research lines:

- Measuring the exposome
- Linking exposome and health
- Developing exposome interventions

== Education ==
In February 2021, Exposome-NL organised a publicly accessible Massive open online course (MOOC) about the exposome.

== Partners ==
- VU University Medical Center and Academic Medical Center (Amsterdam)
- University of Groningen
- Leiden University
- University Medical Center Utrecht
- Utrecht University

== Executive Board ==
The board consists of the six Principal Investigators of Exposome-NL

- Roel Vermeulen - Utrecht University
- Joline Beulens - VU University Medical Center
- Rick Grobbee - Utrecht University
- Sasha Zhernakova - University of Groningen
- Thomas Hankemeier - Leiden University
- Mei-Po Kwan - Utrecht University

== Scientific Advisory Board ==
- Prof. Eric Rimm - Harvard University
- Prof. Jeff Brooks - University of Toronto
- Prof. Dean Jones - Emory University
- Prof. Effy Vayena - ETH Zurich
- Prof. Maria De lorio - National University of Singapore
