= Kamo Station (Fukuoka) =

Metro station in Fukuoka, Japan

Coordinates: 33.5505°N 130.3377°E

N03 Kamo Station 賀茂駅
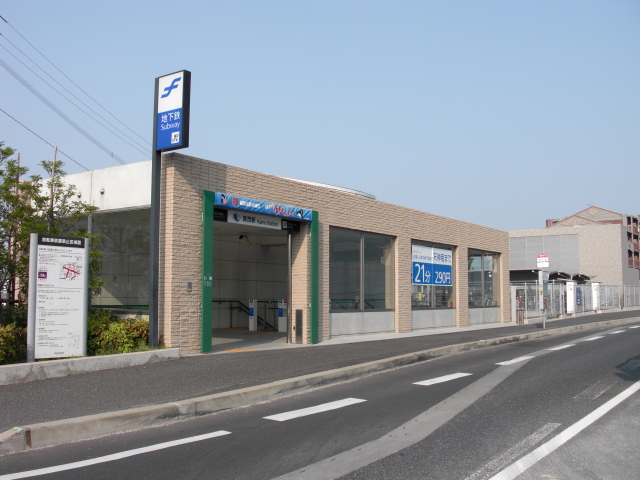

General information
- Location: Sawara, Fukuoka, Fukuoka; Japan
- System: Fukuoka City Subway station
- Operator: Fukuoka City Subway
- Line: Nanakuma Line

Other information
- Station code: N03

History
- Opened: February 3, 2005; 21 years ago

Passengers
- 2006: 1,714 daily

Services
Preceding station	Fukuoka City Subway	Following station
Jirōmaru N02 towards Hashimoto	Nanakuma Line	Noke N04 towards Hakata
Location

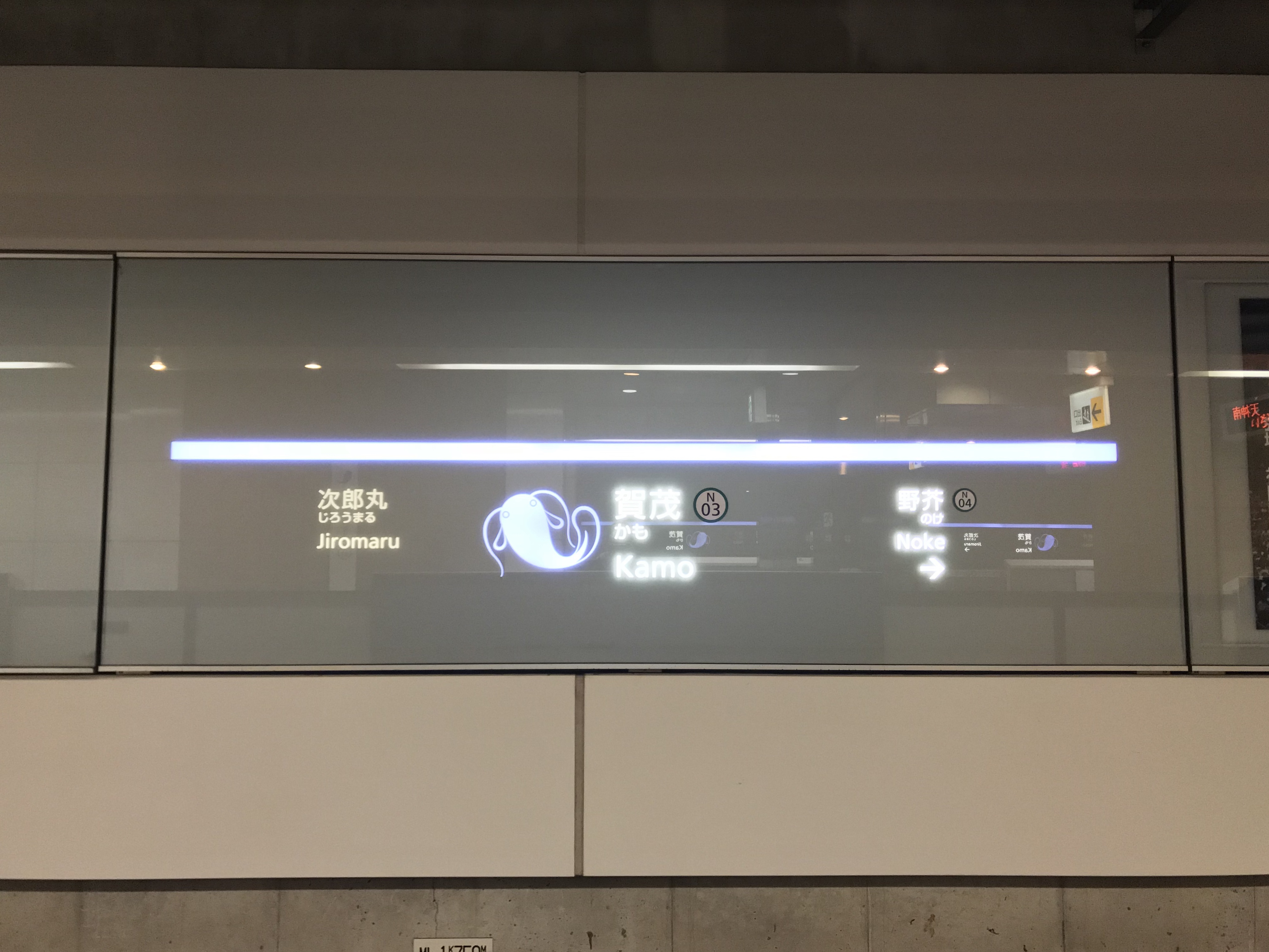
Station symbol

Kamo Station (賀茂駅) is a subway station on the Fukuoka City Subway Nanakuma Line in Sawara-ku, Fukuoka in Japan. Its station symbol is a catfish in violet, the sign of the Kamo Shrine.

== Lines ==
- Fukuoka City Subway
  - Nanakuma Line

== Platforms ==
1	■ Nanakuma Line	for Hakata
2	■ Nanakuma Line	for Hashimoto

== Vicinity ==
- Kanakuzu River
- Kamo Shrine
- Yamada Denki
- Fukuoka Dental College
- Fukuoka College of Health Sciences

== History ==
- February 3, 2005: Opening of the station
