= EFI =

EFI may refer to:

== People ==
=== Given name ===
- Efi Arazi (1937–2013), Israeli businessman and high-tech entrepreneur
- Efi Foufoula-Georgiou (born 1957), Greek-American environmental engineer
- Efi Oshaya (born 1956), Israeli politician
- Efi Thodi (born 1934), Greek singer

=== Surname ===
- Andrey Efi (born 1960), Russian artist
- Tufuga Efi (born 1937), Samoan politician

== Technology ==
- Electronic fuel injection
- Exploding foil initiator
- Extensible Firmware Interface, a computer firmware standard
  - EFI system partition

== Other uses ==
- École Française d'Islamabad, a French international school in Pakistan
- EFI Automotive, a French automotive company
- Efik language
- Electronics for Imaging, an American digital printing company
- Enrico Fermi Institute, at the University of Chicago
- Enterprise Florida, an American economic development organization
- Environmentalist Foundation of India, a wildlife conservation group
- Enzyme Function Initiative, a computational biology project
- Equestrian Federation of India
- Equestrian Federation of Ireland, now Horse Sport Ireland
- European Federation for Immunogenetics, a scientific society
- European Forest Institute, an international organisation
- European Friends of Israel, a political organization
- Evangelical Friends International, a Christian religious organization
- Expeditionary Forces Institute, of the British Navy, Army and Air Force Institutes

== See also ==
- Effie
