= FIS =

FIS or fis may refer to:

== Science and technology ==
- Fis, an E. Coli gene
- Fis phenomenon, a phenomenon in linguistics
- F♯ (musical note)
- Flight information service, an air traffic control service
- Frame Information Structure, a Serial ATA technology

== Organizations ==
=== Education ===
- Flandreau Indian School, South Dakota, United States, for Native Americans
- Frankfurt International School
- French International School of Hong Kong
- Fukuoka International School, Japan

=== Intelligence services ===
Federal Intelligence Service, a Swiss intelligence service

- Fiji Intelligence Services
- Foreign Intelligence Service (Russia) (Russian: Служба внешней разведки Российской Федерации, romanized: Sluzhba vneshney razvedki Rossiyskoy Federatsii, IPA: [ˈsluʐbə ˈvnʲɛʂnʲɪj rɐˈzvʲɛtkʲɪ])

=== Other organizations ===
- FIS (company), an American financial services company
- Fairy Investigation Society, a paranormal society
- Festival Internacional de Santander, a Spanish music festival
- Fish Information and Services, an international news agency
- International Ski and Snowboard Federation (French: Fédération Internationale de Ski et de Snowboard)
- Islamic Salvation Front (French: Front Islamique du Salut), a defunct political party in Algeria
- Italian Fencing Federation (Italian: Federazione Italiana Scherma) and
- Italian Scout Federation (Italian: Federazione Italiana dello Scautismo)

== Surname ==
- Julio Fis (born 1974), Spanish/Cuban handball player
- Marcos Fis (born 2007), Spanish handball player
- Ljubomir Pavićević Fis (born 1927), Serbian designer

== Anthropology ==
- Fis is also the Albanian word for the Albanian clans.

== See also ==
- FI (disambiguation)
