= Hagi Šein =

Estonian journalist (1945–2024)

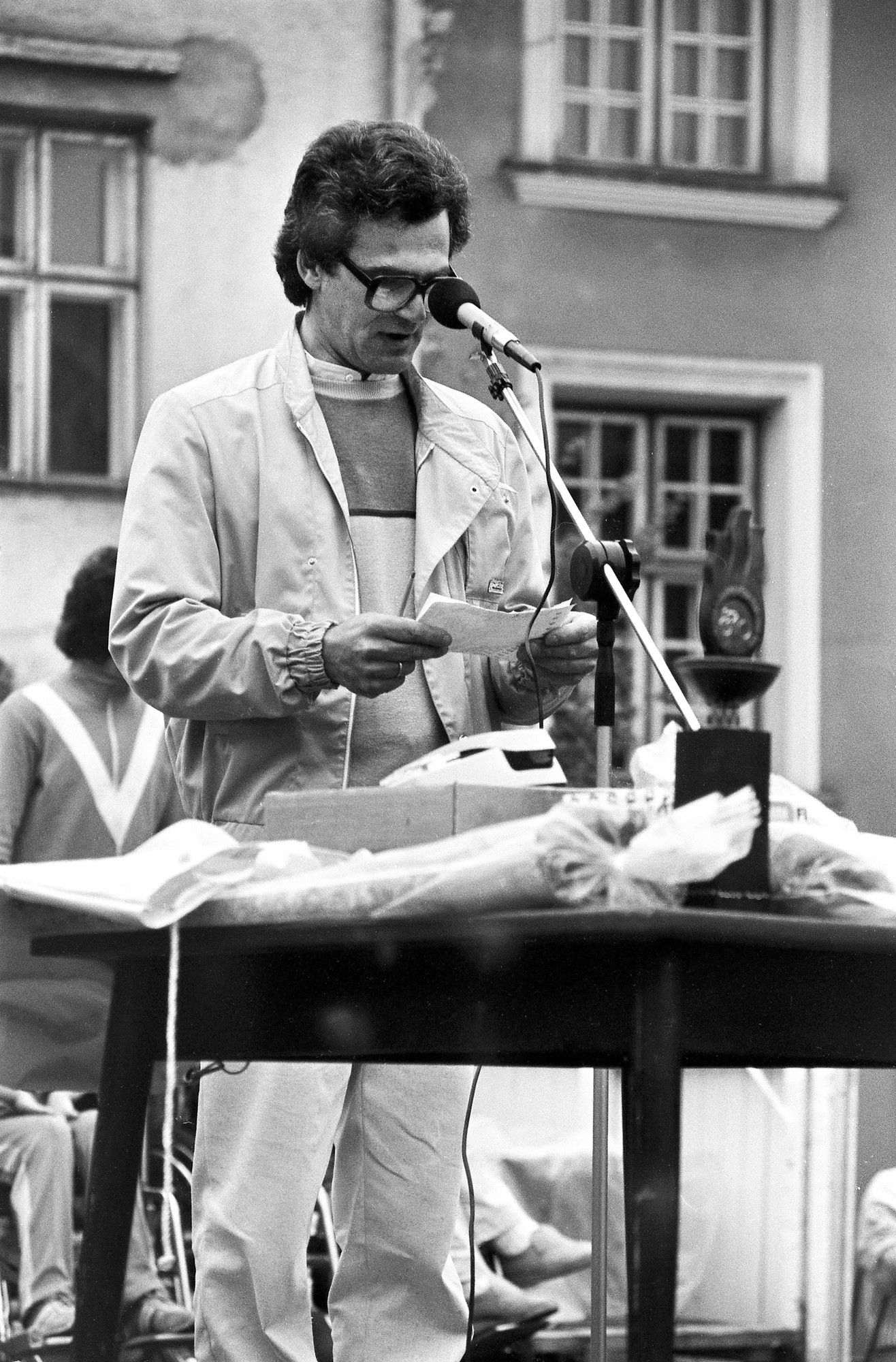
Šein in 1987

Hagi Šein (also, Hagi Shein; 13 September 1945 – 19 June 2024) was an Estonian journalist, film director, screenwriter, professor, media pedagogue and former figure skater.

== Biography ==
Šein was born into a Jewish family in Tallinn. In 1973 he graduated cum laude from Tartu State University, majoring in history and sociology. He then completed his postgraduate studies in television journalism and telesociology at the Department of Journalism at Moscow State University. In 2001, he received a master's of science (MSc) degree in journalism from the University of Tartu. In 2007, he completed his doctoral studies in television history and media policy. In 2002, he was elected professor of television media for five years by the Council of Concordia International University Estonia.

Šein trained as a figure skater for eleven years and with partner Madli Krispin, won a silver medal in pair skating at the 1962 Estonian Figure Skating Championships.

From 1967 until 1997, he worked at Eesti Televisioon (ETV). From 1992 until 1997, as Director General of ETV. From 2000 to 2012 he was the Member of the Estonian National Broadcasting Council and 2010–2012 the Chairman of the council. He was the author of many television series, including Prillitoos (1983–1990), Mõtleme veel (1987–1989).

Šein taught television at Tartu State University (1976–1986). From 1997 to 2003, he worked as the Dean of the Faculty of Media at Concordia International University, then at International University Audentes (2003–2005) and the Baltic Film, Media, Arts and Communication School of Tallinn University (acting director and Director, 2005–2011).

He was a visiting professor of television culture at the Baltic Film, Media, Arts and Communication Institute of Tallinn University, also the editor-in-chief of the Estonian Film Database (www.efis.ee) and the database of television history and science Telekraat (www.telekraat.ee). He was for several years also a member (chair from 2019 to 2022) of the council of the Estonian Film Institute, the council of Tallinnfilm and the council of the Estonian National Archives.

As a screenwriter and director, Šein made 12 documentaries, including Ratastoolitants (1986), Raudrohutee (1985) and Lepatriinutalv (1989). He also wrote research on the history of Estonian television, the most important of which include Suur teleraamat (TEA Kirjastus, 2005), Televisioon Eestis 1955–2004 (University of Tartu Publishing House, 2004) and Eesti telemaastik 1991–2001. Uurimused. Diskussioon. Teabekogud (University of Tartu Publishing House, 2002). and Digiajastu teleraamat. Digiaja televisioon Eestis 2000-2020 ( Tallinn, 2021).

Hagi Šein was a member of the Social Democratic Party. He was also a member of the leadership of the Estonian People's Front, the president of the Estonian Forum of National Minorities, a member of the Tallinn city council (2001–2004), a representative of the President of the Republic at the roundtable on national minorities, and a member of the Academic Council of the President of the Republic (2002–2007).

Šein died on 19 June 2024, at the age of 78.

== Acknowledgements ==
- Order of the White Star, IV Class (2002)
- Order of the National Coat of Arms, III Class (2006)
- 2014 – Annual Award of the Audiovisual Art Endowment Fund of the Estonian Cultural Foundation (mission award for the creation and consistent development of the Estonian Film Database)
- 2015 – Order of Merit of Tallinn University
- 2021 – EFTA (Estonian Film and Television Awards) Lifetime Achievement Award
- 2022 – National Culture Foundation award for contribution to the development of media and television culture
