= Tallinn Law School =

Unit of Tallinn University of Technology

Coordinates: 59.3966°N 24.6697°E

Tallinn Law School (TLS) (Estonian: TTÜ õiguse instituut) is one of the departments of Faculty of Social Sciences of Tallinn University of Technology and one of three law schools operating in Estonia. Although the law school offers basic education in all areas of law, it is focused in research and specialised studies in European law, public law and technology law.

TLS consists of four structural units: Chair of Public Law, Chair of Law & Technology and Jean Monnet Chair of European Law and Human Rights Centre.

== History ==
Initially founded within Concordia International University Estonia (CIUE) in 1996, the Law School started with 100 students who are now prominent lawyers and legal professionals in Estonia and abroad. The first Dean of the Law School was Frank Emmert, who was followed by Tanel Kerikmäe in 2002.

In summer 2003, after the curricula, faculty, staff and students of CIUE merged with Audentes University, the Law School continued the English language law programs within International University Concordia Audentes (IUCA), whereas the Law School also took over managing the Estonian-language law programs of Audentes University, which also included the law program of another merged private school, Veritas.

In 2005 Law School successfully re-accredited law programs and closed the economic law program. In 2006, as a sign of strength in Estonia, the Law School opened daytime studies also in Estonian (previously studies in Estonian had been available only during weekend distance learning). in 2007, Audentes University and its international unit IUCA merged to form International University Audentes.

In July 2008, IUA was merged with Tallinn School of Economics and Business Administration (TSEBA) of Tallinn University of Technology, the second largest public university in Estonia and the biggest in Tallinn. During academic year 2008/2009 IUA continued to function as a separate unit of TSEBA.

In December 2008, TUT Council decided to establish the IUA law school as a separate unit within the Faculty of Social Sciences of TUT. On 17 February 2009 TUT Council decided to establish from 1 July 2009 Tallinn Law School (in Estonian TTÜ õiguse instituut).
