= Effie =

Effie is a feminine pet name of Efthymia (Greek: Ευθυμία), Eftychia (Greek: Ευτυχία), or Euphemia (Greek: Ευφημία) Hephzibah. It is also a given name by itself, an anglicisation of the Gaelic name Oighrig and a masculine pet name of Ephraim. Notable people with the name include:

== Women ==
- Effie Bancroft (1840–1921), English actress and theatre manager
- Effie Boggess (1927–2021), American politician
- Effie Cardale (1873–1960), New Zealand community and welfare worker
- Effie Cherry (1869–1944), American performer, part of the Cherry Sisters touring vaudeville act
- Effie Crockett (1857–1940), American actress
- Euphemia Effie Ellsler (1855–1942), American stage and film actress
- Euphemia Effie Germon (1845–1914), American stage actress
- Euphemia Effie Gray (1828–1897), Scottish model, married to John Ruskin and John Everett Millais
- Effie Hotchkiss, American pioneering motorcyclist in 1915
- Effie Mae Martin Howard, real name of Rosie Lee Tompkins (1936–2006), African-American quiltmaker
- Effie McCollum Jones (1869–1952), American Universalist minister and suffragette
- Effie Neal Jones (1919–2002), American civil rights activist
- Effie Mona Mack (1888–1969), American historian
- Effie Pedaliu, British historian
- Effie Louise Power (1873–1969), American children's librarian and author
- Euphemia Effie Newbigging Richardson (1849–1928), New Zealand landowner and litigant
- Effie Robinson (1920–2003), American social worker and public housing director
- Effie Hoffman Rogers (1855–1918), American educator
- Effie Adelaide Rowlands (1859–1936), usual pen name of Australian-born British novelist Effie Albanesi
- Effie Shannon (1867–1954), American stage and silent screen actress
- Effie Smith (1914–1977), American jazz and blues singer and comedian
- Effie Anderson Smith (1869–1955), American painter
- Effie Waller Smith (1879–1960), African-American poet
- Effie A. Southworth (1860–1947), American botanist and mycologist
- Effie Wilder (1909–2007), American novelist
- Effie, South Korean musician

== Men ==
- Elisha Effie Norton (1873–1950), American Major League Baseball pitcher

== Fictional characters ==
- Effie Bowen, a character in Indian Summer (1886), a novel by William Dean Howells
- Effi Briest (1895), the main character of a German novel by Theodor Fontane adapted as Effi Briest (2009 film)
- Effie Clinker, a radio character developed by Edgar Bergen
- Effie Deans, in Sir Walter Scott's 1818 novel The Heart of Midlothian
- Mrs Euphegenia "Effie" Doubtfire, a disguised character in the 1993 film Mrs. Doubtfire, played by Robin Williams
- Effie Grant Munro, in the Sherlock Holmes story "The Adventure of the Yellow Face"
- Effie Harrison, on the British soap opera Emmerdale
- Effie Kaligaris, in The Sisterhood of the Traveling Pants novels
- Effie (Euphemia) Macinnes / McDonald, a long standing character in Take the High Road, played by Mary Riggans
- Effie Newsome / Effie Crabtree, in the Canadian series Murdoch Mysteries, played by Canadian actress Clare McConnell since 2018
- Effie Perine, Sam Spade's secretary in the novel The Maltese Falcon and its film adaptations
- Effie Rawlinson - character in The Case of the Late Pig; an Albert Campion mystery by Margery Allingham
- Effie Spicer, on the British soap opera Coronation Street from 1968 to 1969
- Effie Stephanidis, comedic television character, played by Australian actress Mary Coustas
- Effie Trinket, in the book series The Hunger Games
- Effie White, one of the lead characters in the Broadway musical Dreamgirls
- Effie, in the video game Fire Emblem Fates
- Effie, a non playable character in Street Fighter III
- Miss Effie, a character from "Patsy Montana — I Didn't Know The Gun Was Loaded"

== See also ==
- Effie M. Morrissey, a schooner used for arctic research
- Effi (disambiguation)
- Effy Stonem, a character on Skins
- Eftychia, a Greek given name
- Euphemia (disambiguation)
