= Eftychia =

Eutychia (Greek: ευτυχία), phonetically transliterated as Eftychia or Eftichia (/ˌɛftiˈhiːə/) is a Greek female given name, meaning "happiness". It is derived from the Greek words εὖ (good) and τύχη (luck). The diminutive Effie is a pet form of Eftychia.

Notable people with the given name include:

- Eftychia Karagianni (born 1973), Greek water polo player and Olympic medalist
- Eftichia Michailidou (born 1977), Greek footballer
- Eftychia Papagianopoulou (1893–1972), Greek lyricist
- Eftychia Papavasilopoulou (born 1981), Greek-American diver
- Effy Vayena (born 1972), Greek and Swiss bioethicist

== See also ==
- Eutychia
