= Effi =

Effi may refer to:

- Efraim Effi Birnbaum (born 1954), Israeli basketball coach
- Efraim Effi Eitam (born 1952), Israeli politician and retired brigadier-general
- Efraim Effi Wizen (born 1956), Israeli computer animator and visual effects specialist
- Effi Briest, title character of the 1896 novel and various film and television adaptations

== See also ==
- EFI (disambiguation)
- Effie (disambiguation)
- Effy Stonem, a character in the television series Skins
