= Effie (disambiguation) =

Effie is a feminine given name.

Effie may also refer to:

== Places in the United States ==
- Effie, Louisiana, an unincorporated community
- Effie, Minnesota, a city
- Effie (unorganized territory), Minnesota
- Effie, Mississippi, an unincorporated community
- Effie, West Virginia, an unincorporated community
- Lake Effie, Florida

== Other uses ==
- Effie (film), a biopic about Effie Gray
- Effie: Just Quietly, a 2001 Australian satirical television series
