= Expert Review of Clinical Immunology =

- Discipline: Clinical Immunology
- Language: English
- Edited by: Thomas Forsthuber, Timothy Radstake

Publication details
- History: 2005-present
- Publisher: Informa
- Frequency: Monthly
- Impact factor: 3.907 (2018)

Standard abbreviations
- ISO 4: Expert Rev. Clin. Immunol.

Indexing
- ISSN: 1744-666X (print); 1744-8409 (web)

Links
- Journal homepage; Online access; Online archive

Expert Review of Clinical Immunology is a monthly peer-reviewed medical journal covering all aspects of clinical immunology. It is part of the Expert Review series, published by Informa. The editors-in-chief are Thomas Forsthuber (University of Texas at San Antonio) and Timothy Radstake (University Medical Center Utrecht). The journal was established in 2005. According to the Journal Citation Reports, the journal has a 2013 impact factor of 3.342.
