= Fujisaki Station (Fukuoka) =

Metro station in Fukuoka, Japan

Coordinates: 33°34′53″N 130°20′53″E

K03 Fujisaki Station 藤崎駅
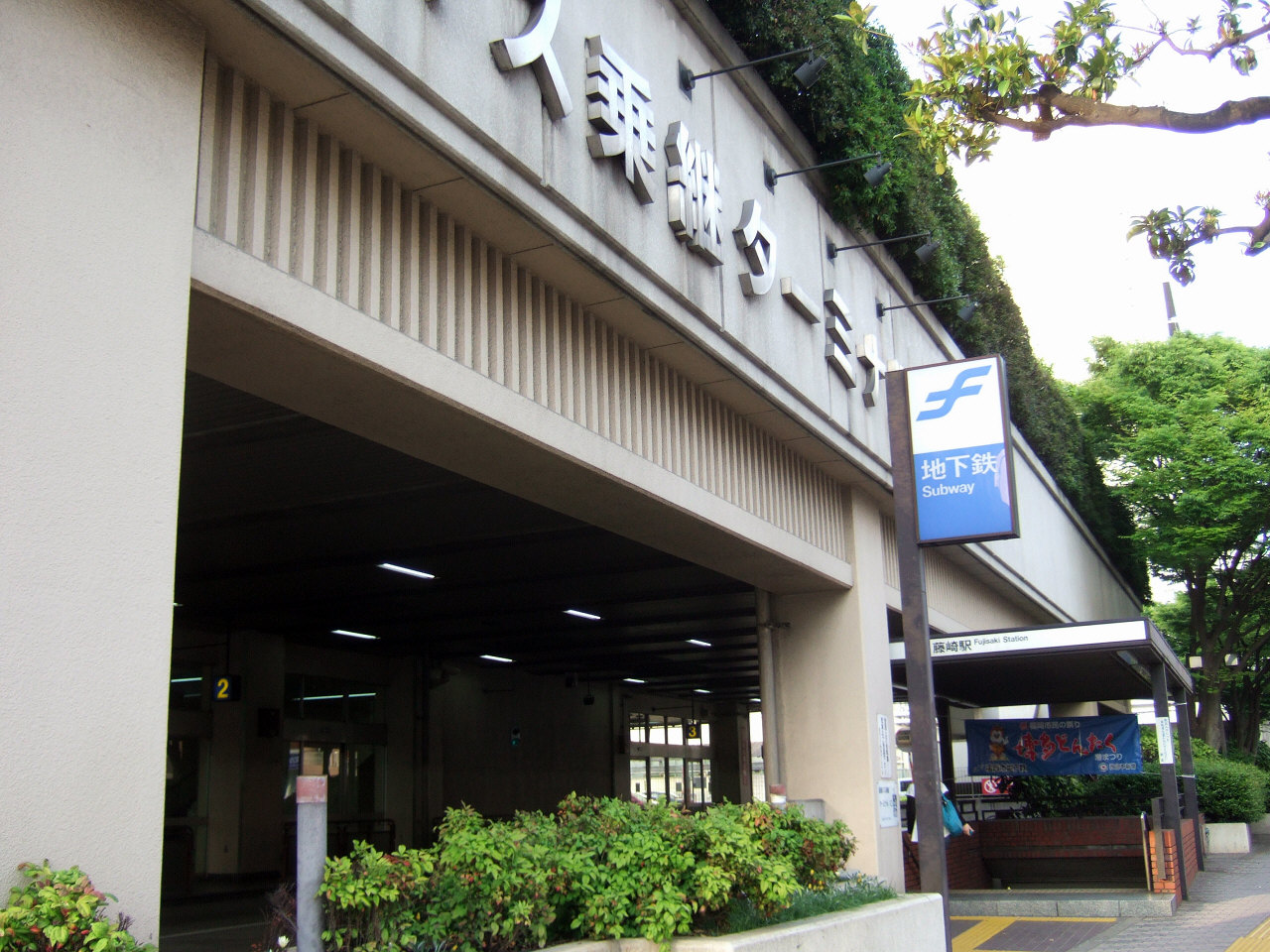
- Exit No.2 and Fujisaki Bus Terminal in May 2008

General information
- Location: Sawara, Fukuoka, Fukuoka; Japan
- System: Fukuoka City Subway station
- Operator: Fukuoka City Subway
- Line: Airport Line
- Connections: Bus terminal

Other information
- Station code: K03

History
- Opened: 26 July 1981; 45 years ago

Passengers
- 2006: 9,974 daily

Services
| Preceding station | Fukuoka City Subway | Following station |
|---|---|---|
| Muromi K02 towards Meinohama | Airport Line | Nishijin K04 towards Fukuoka Airport |
Location
- Location within Fukuoka city

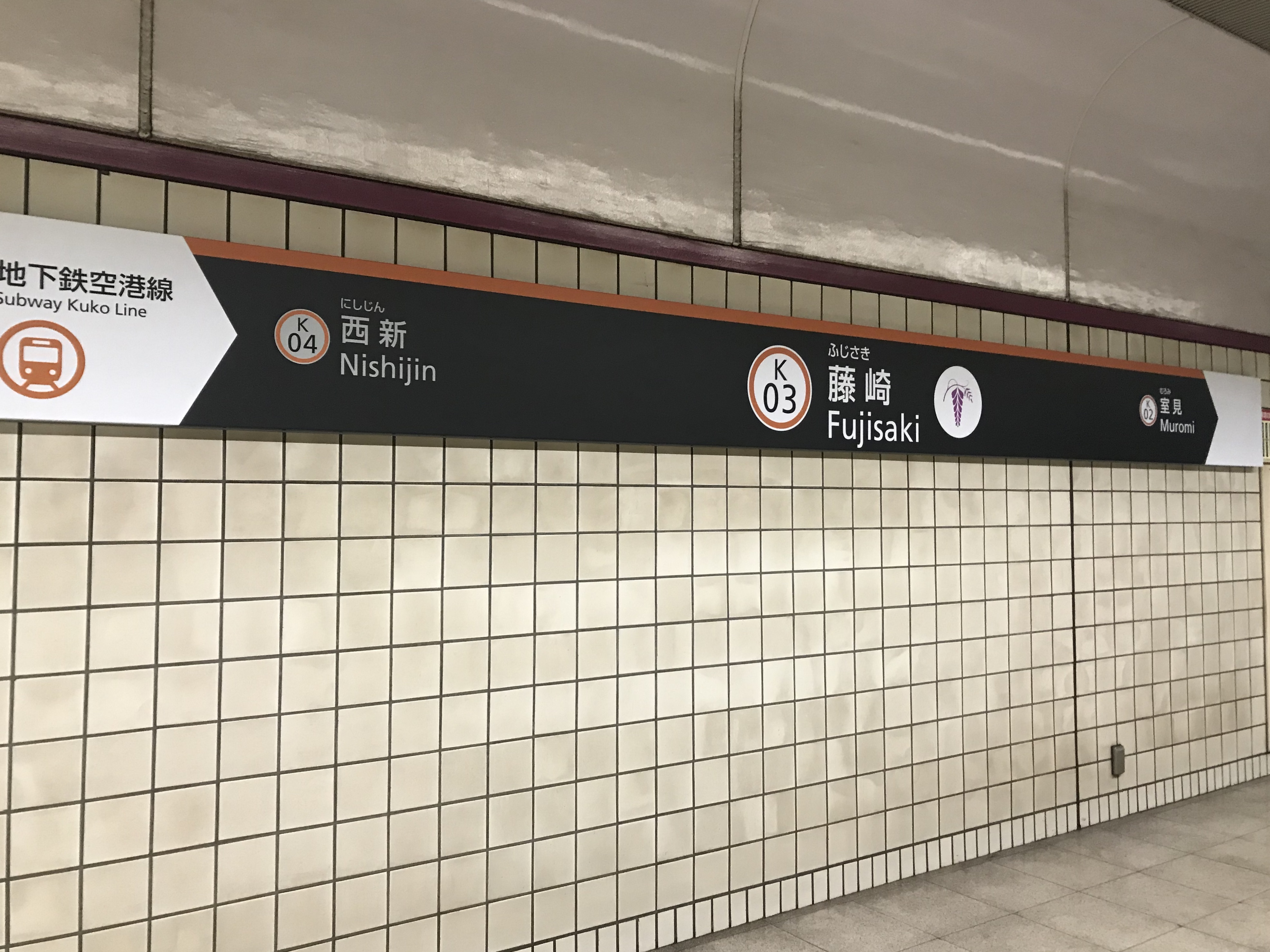
Station sign

Fujisaki Station (藤崎駅, Fujisaki-eki) is a train station located in Sawara-ku, Fukuoka in Japan. Its station symbol is a wisteria flower Fuji (藤) in violet.

== Lines ==
- Fukuoka City Subway
  - Airport Line

== Platforms ==
| 1 | ■ Kūkō Line | for Tenjin, Hakata, Fukuoka Airport and Kaizuka |
| 2 | ■ Kūkō Line | for Meinohama, Chikuzen-Maebaru and Karatsu |

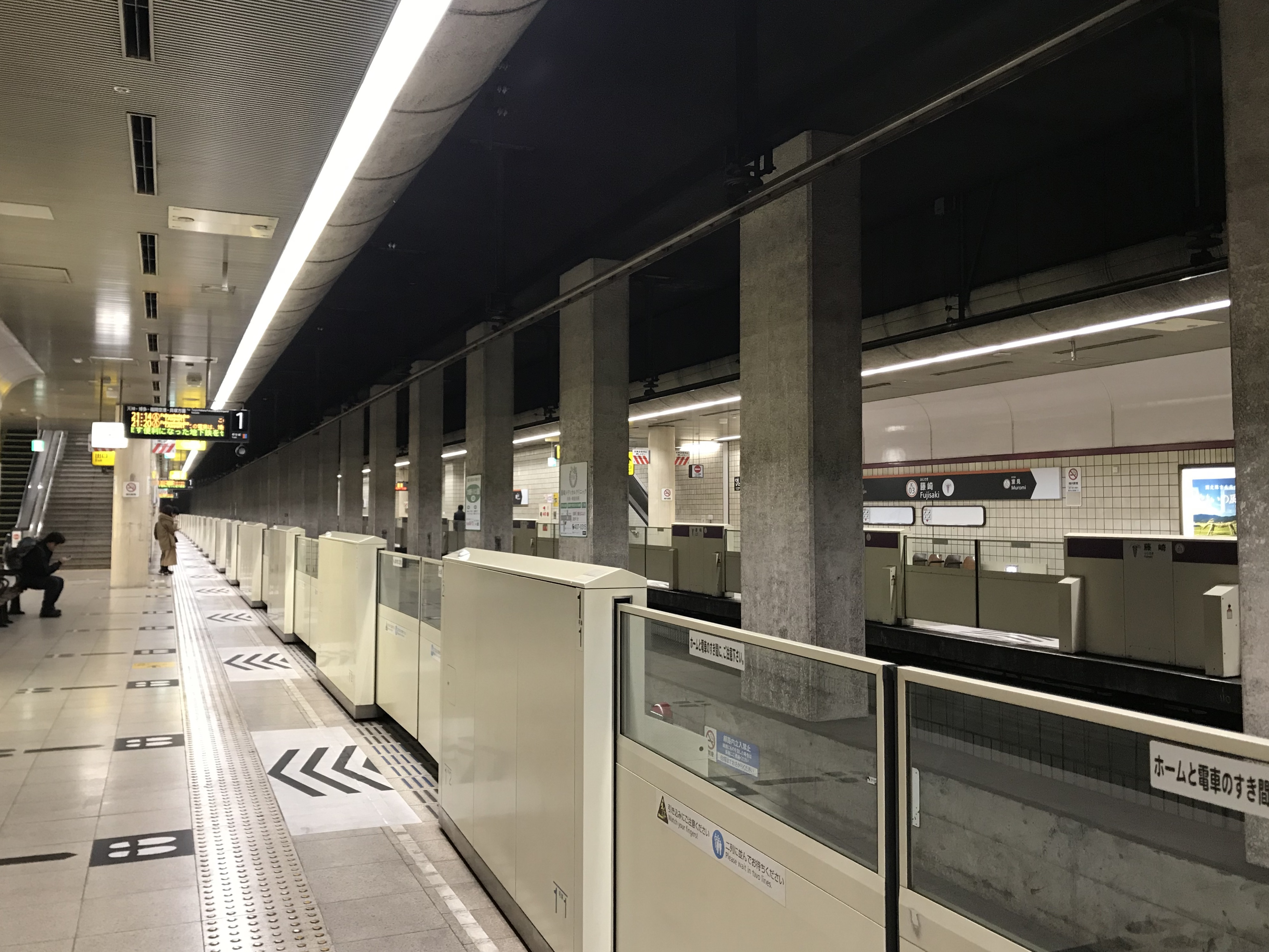
Platform 1

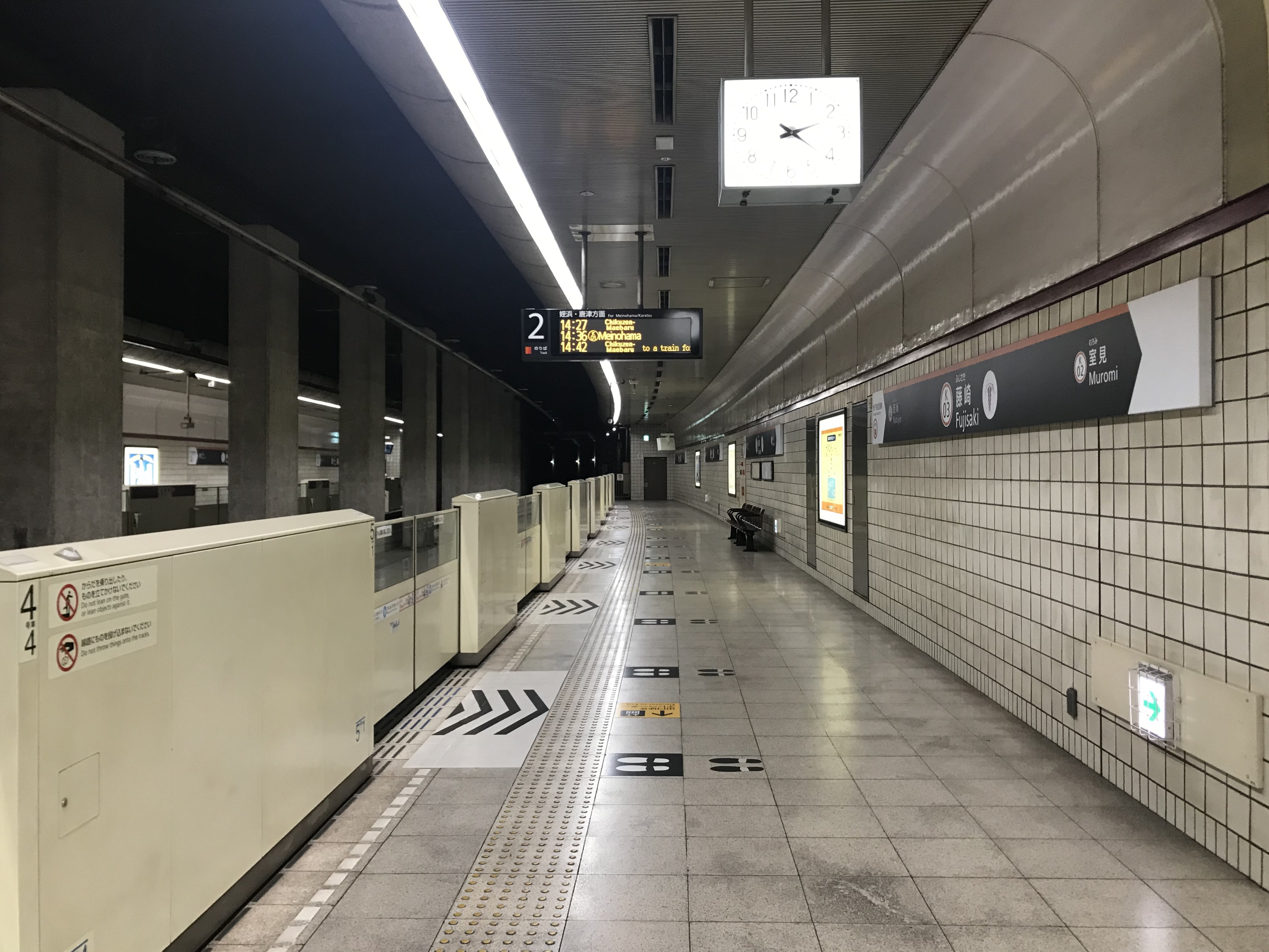
Platform 2

== Vicinity ==
- Sawara Ward Office
- Sawara Civic Center
- Fukuoka City Education Center
- Sawara Public Health Center
- Sawara Post Office
- Sawara Library
- Sawara Police
- several Elementary and Junior High Schools
- Forest Management Office
- Fujisaki Bus Terminal
