= Kamo Station =

Kamo Station is the name of four train stations in Japan:

- Kamo Station (Fukuoka) (賀茂駅)
- Kamo Station (Kyoto) (加茂駅)
- Kamo Station (Mie) (加茂駅)
- Kamo Station (Niigata) (加茂駅)
