= Noke Station =

Metro station in Fukuoka, Japan

Coordinates: 33.5484°N 130.3472°E

N04 Noke Station 野芥駅
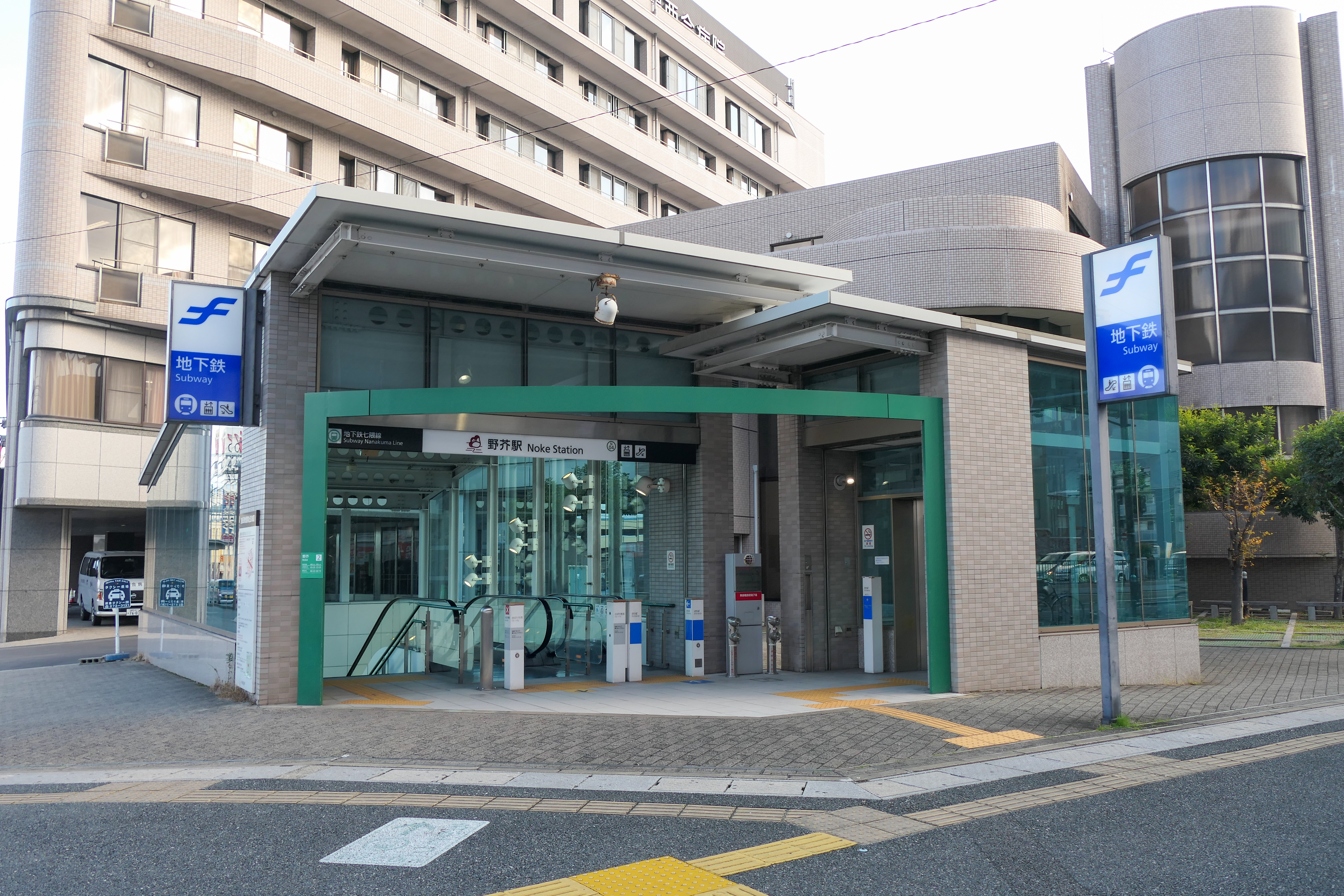
- Entrance No.2

General information
- Location: Sawara, Fukuoka, Fukuoka; Japan
- System: Fukuoka City Subway station
- Operator: Fukuoka City Subway
- Line: Nanakuma Line

Other information
- Station code: N04

History
- Opened: February 3, 2005; 21 years ago

Passengers
- 2006: 2,370 daily

Services
Preceding station	Fukuoka City Subway	Following station
Kamo N03 towards Hashimoto	Nanakuma Line	Umebayashi N05 towards Hakata
Location

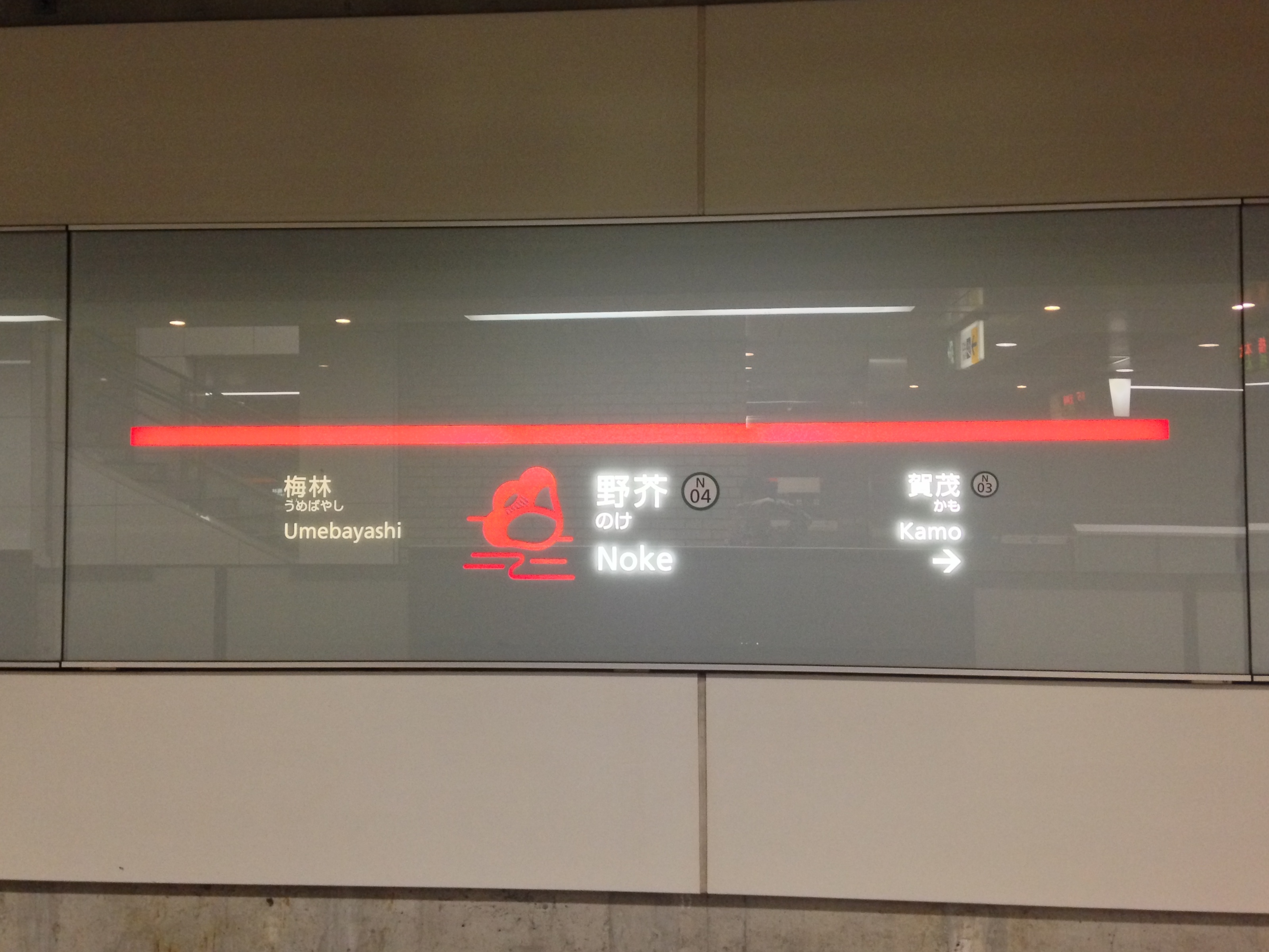
Station symbol

Noke Station (野芥駅) is a subway station on the Fukuoka City Subway Nanakuma Line in Sawara-ku, Fukuoka in Japan. Its station symbol is a picture of Camellia flowers in red, floating in the Tsubaki channel.

== Lines ==
- Fukuoka City Subway
  - Nanakuma Line

== Platforms ==
1	■ Nanakuma Line	for Hakata
2	■ Nanakuma Line	for Hashimoto

== Vicinity ==
- Route 263
- Fukuoka Highway 5
- Nishitetsu bus stop
- Post office
- Daiei
- Mochikichi

== History ==
- February 3, 2005: Opening of the station
