= Roel Vermeulen =

Dutch epidemiologist

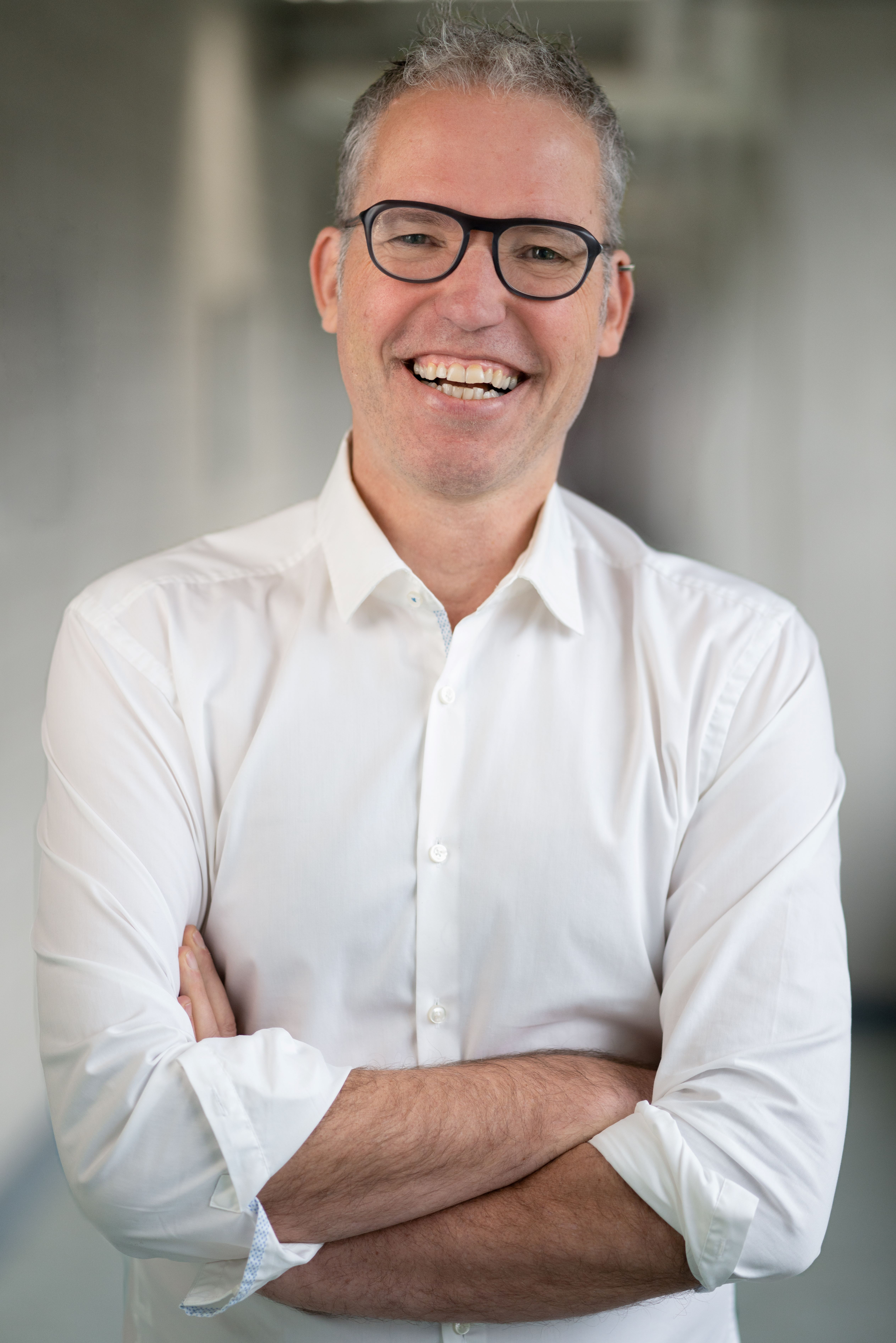
- Born: Rudolf Cornelis Henricus Vermeulen; October 14, 1970 (age 55); Made, The Netherlands
- Education: Utrecht University
- Known for: Exposome
- Scientific career
- Fields: Environmental epidemiology, Exposome, Environmental science, Biology
- Workplaces: Utrecht University, University Medical Center Utrecht, Imperial College London

Roel Vermeulen (born October 14, 1970, in Made, Netherlands) is a Dutch scientist and professor of Environmental epidemiology and Exposome Science at the Institute for Risk Assessment Sciences at Utrecht University and the Julius Centre for Health Sciences and Primary Care at the University Medical Center Utrecht, the Netherlands. In 2024 Prof. Vermeulen was appointed as Distinguished University Professor of Utrecht University in which role he will focus on the theme of planetary and preventive health.

== Career ==
Roel Vermeulen studied Environmental science at Wageningen University and Research and received his PhD degree in 2001 from Utrecht University. He spent six years researching the relationship between environmental factors, molecular changes and the development of cancer at the National Cancer Institute. In 2006, he returned to Utrecht University. In 2017 Roel Vermeulen was appointed as Professor of Environmental Epidemiology and Exposome Analysis at Utrecht University and University Medical Center Utrecht (UMCU)

Since 2024 Vermeulen is Scientific Director of the Institute 4 Preventive Health (i4PH), which is part of the alliance between the Eindhoven University of Technology, Wageningen University & Research (WUR), Utrecht University and University Medical Center Utrecht. He chairs the planetary health community of Utrecht Life Sciences at Utrecht University and holds a visiting professor position at Imperial College London.

Vermeulen coordinates the Dutch research program on the exposome (Exposome-NL), leads an EU project (EXPANSE) as part of the European Human Exposome Network, coordinates the Dutch Hub of the European infrastructure on Exposome research (EIRENE-NL), co-coordinates the International Human Exposome Network (IHEN) and coordinates an EU project on micro- and nanoplastics (AURORA). He is the Principal Investigator of several large case-control and prospective (biobank) studies in occupational and the general population.

Vermeulen has served on many international committees including the World Health Organization and the National Toxicology Program in the USA. He was a member of the Dutch Health Council for over 12 years and has authored/co-authored over 800 academic publications.

== Research ==
Vermeulen's scientific research focuses on environmental risk factors for non-communicable diseases, with a strong emphasis on integrating epidemiology, high-quality exposure/exposome assessment and molecular biology into multidisciplinary investigations in order to:

- Identify new risks, clarify exposure-response relationships, and effect modification by individual susceptibility, and elucidate underlying mechanisms of disease;
- Implement and evaluate interventions in real-world settings.

With his studies in these areas Vermeulen highlights the limitations in current exposure and epidemiological approaches, and the critical need for developing new methods to quantify the external and internal exposome through use of high-resolution exposure monitoring and omics signatures.
