= Muromi Station =

Metro station in Fukuoka, Japan

Coordinates: 33.5812°N 130.3400°E

K02 Muromi Station 室見駅
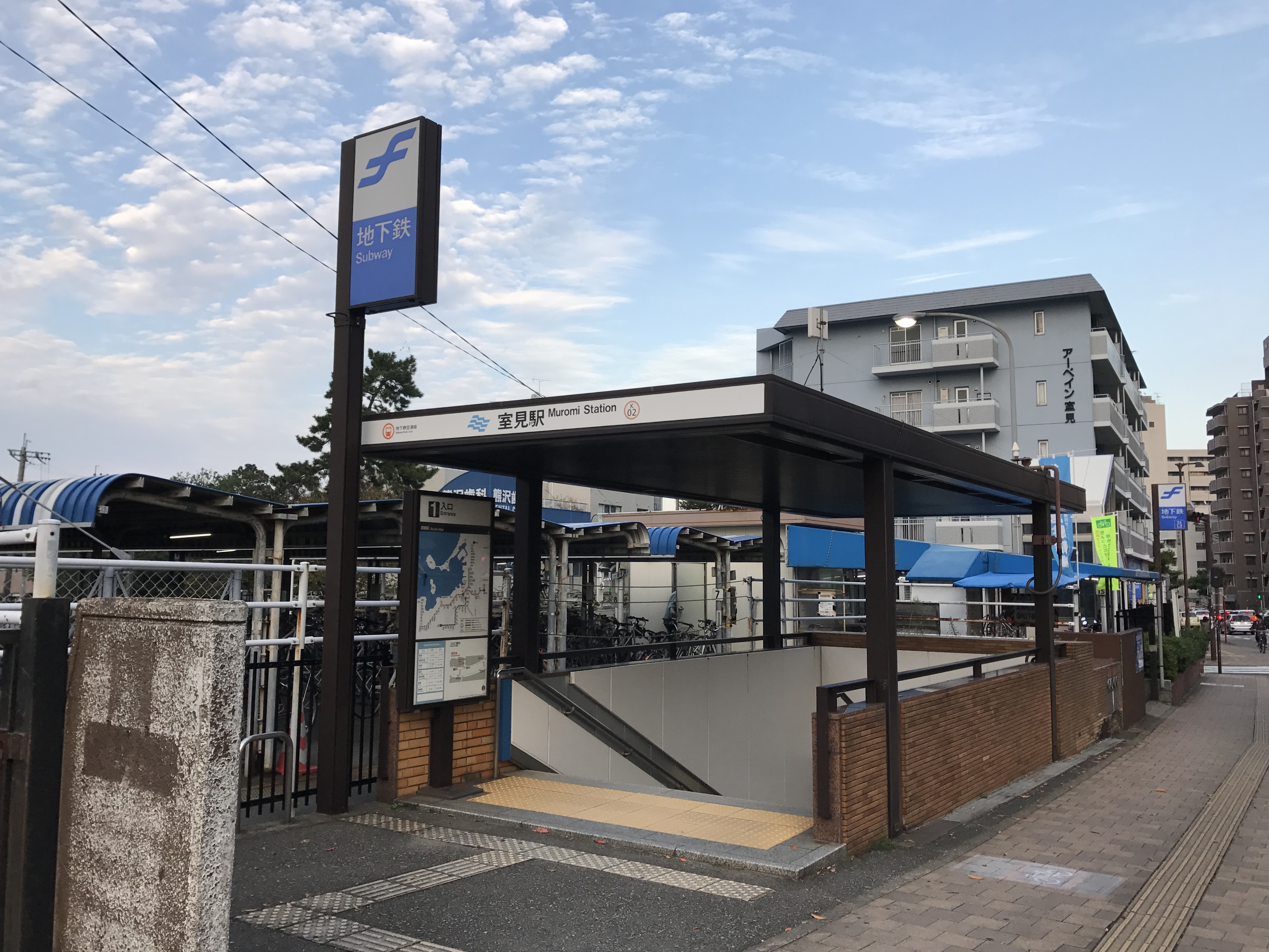
- Entrance No.1, Muromi Station in October 2016

General information
- Location: 5-chōme Muromi, Sawara, Fukuoka, Fukuoka （福岡市早良区室見5丁目） Japan
- System: Fukuoka City Subway station
- Operator: Fukuoka City Subway
- Line: Airport Line
- Platforms: 2

Other information
- Station code: K02

History
- Opened: 26 July 1981; 45 years ago

Passengers
- 2006: 7,360 daily

Services
Preceding station	Fukuoka City Subway	Following station
Meinohama K01 Terminus	Airport Line	Fujisaki K03 towards Fukuoka Airport
Location
- Location within Fukuoka city

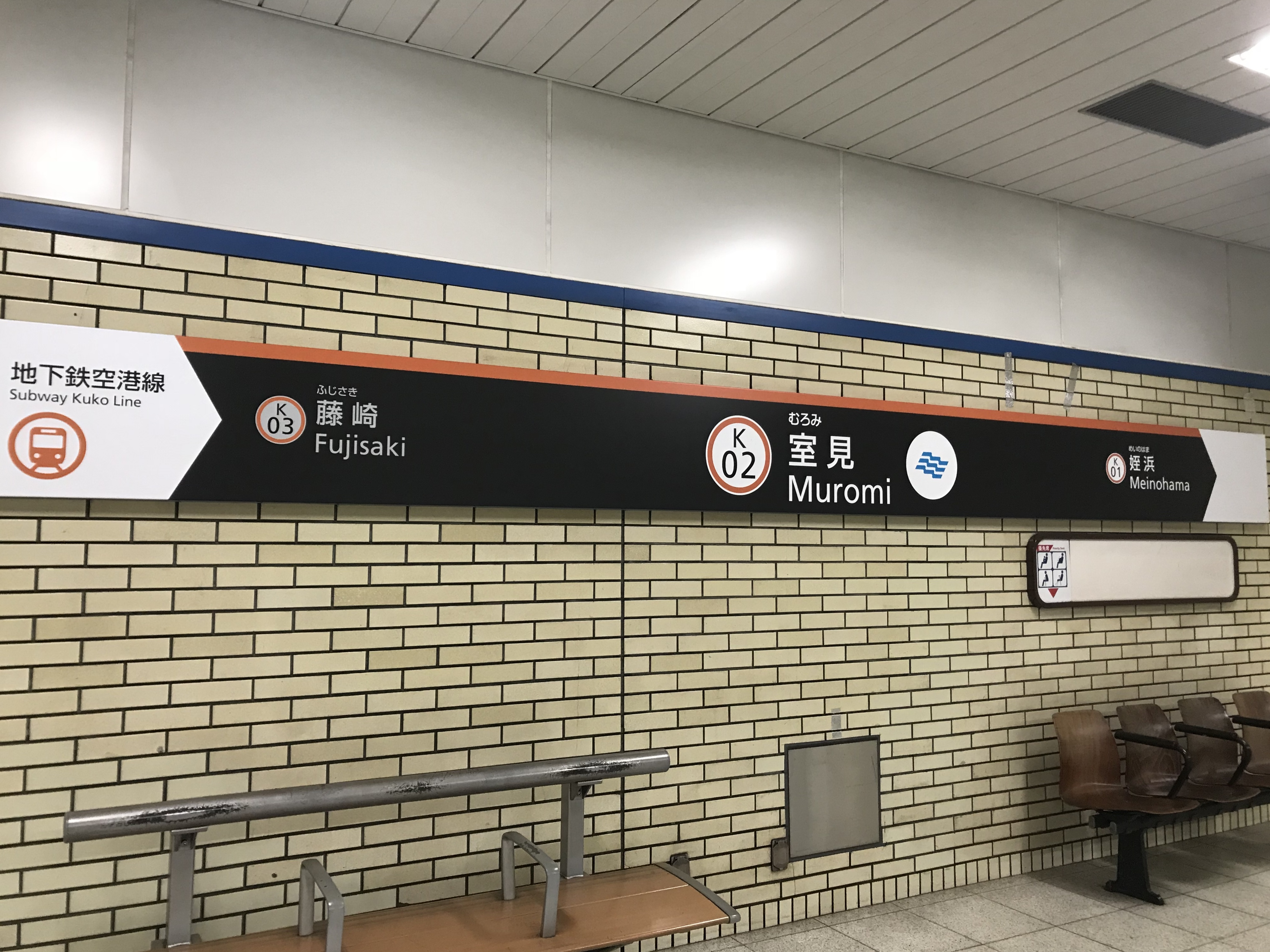
Station sign

Muromi Station (室見駅, Muromi-eki) is a train station located in Sawara-ku, Fukuoka. The station symbol is three wavy blue lines, representing Muromi River.

== Lines ==
- Fukuoka City Subway
  - Airport Line

== Platforms ==
1	■ Kūkō Line	for Tenjin, Hakata, Fukuoka Airport and Kaizuka
2	■ Kūkō Line	for Meinohama, Chikuzen-Maebaru and Karatsu

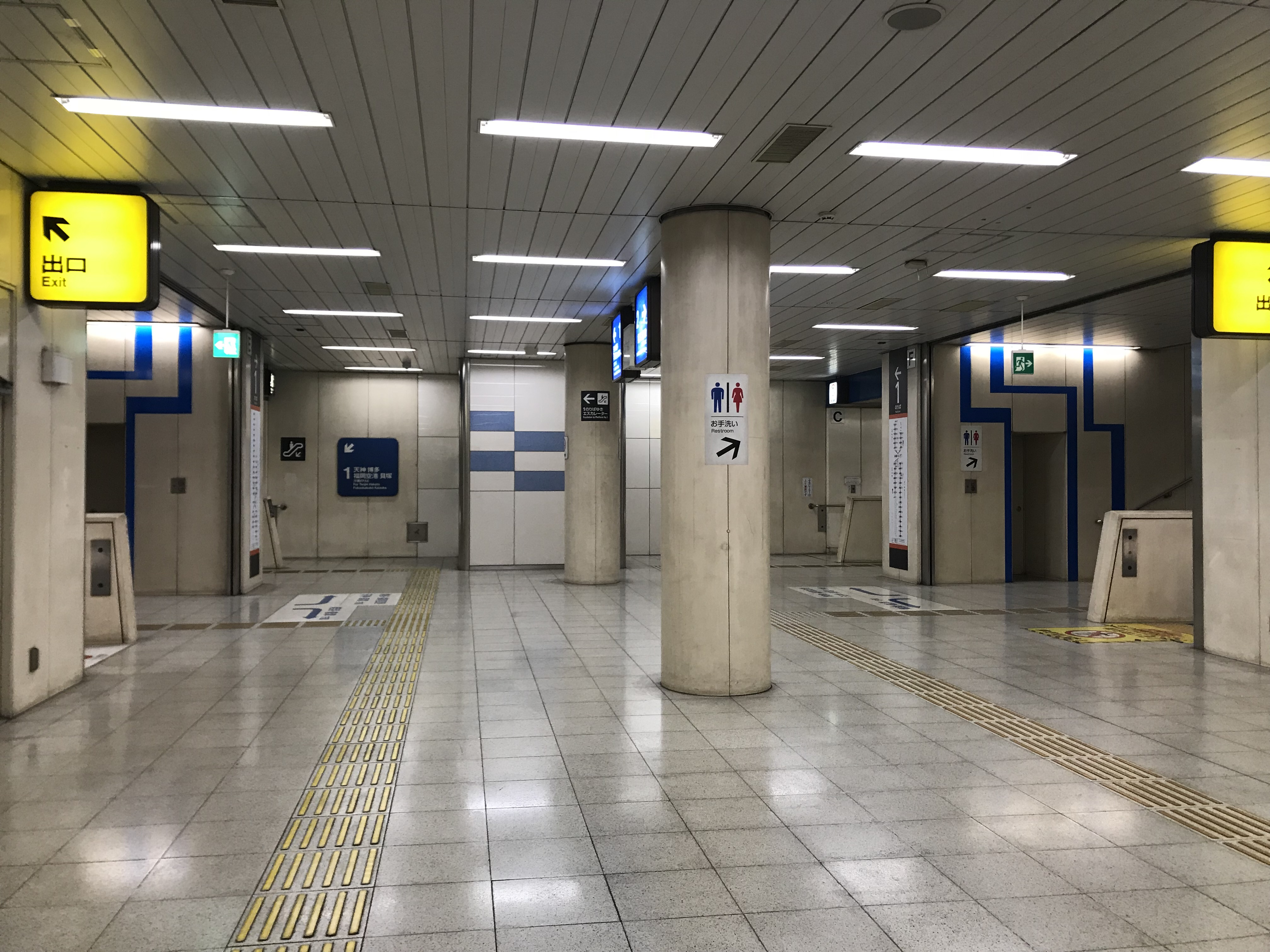
Concourse

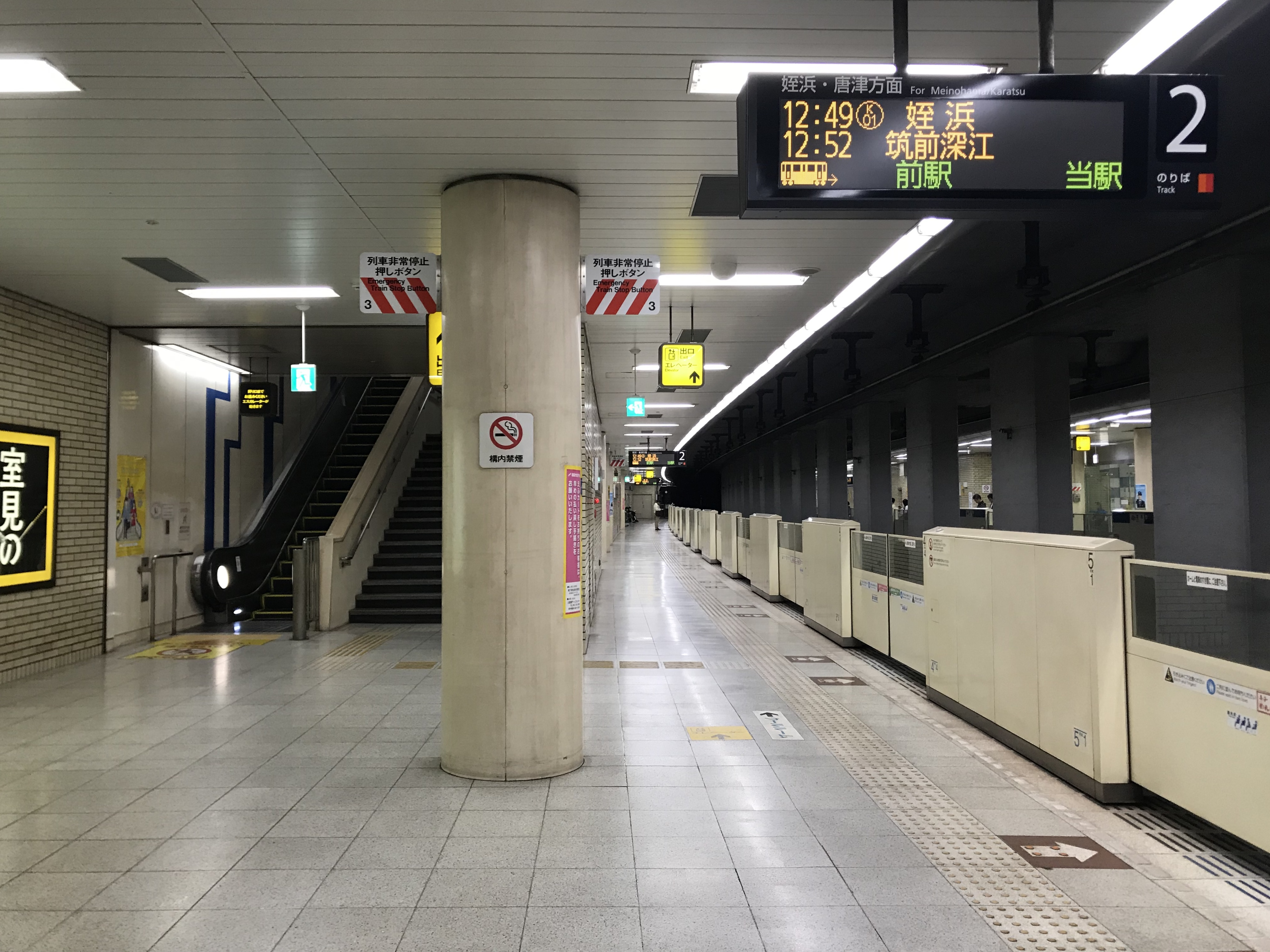
Platform

== Vicinity ==
- Muromi Post Office
- Muromi River
- Muromi Kindergarten
- Fukuoka Expressway - Route 1
- Fukuoka Elementary School
- Muromi Wings Dormitory

== History ==
- July 26, 1981: Opening
- December 12, 2003: Introduction of platform screen doors for the first time in Kyūshū
