= Eutychia =

Eutychia is a female name of Greek origin which derives from the Ancient Greek name Εὐτύχιος (Eutychios), which originated from the Ancient Greek adjective εὐτυχής (eutyches) "the one whose fortune favors". Eutychia may refer to:

- Eutychia (now Zygaena), a genus of moths in the family Zygaenidae
- One of the Daughters of Philip of the Biblical Philip the Evangelist, according to Eusebius
- The mother of Saint Lucy, a third/fourth century martyr
- Another name of Euphrosyne, one of the Greek Charities and goddess of good cheer, joy, and mirth
- Eftychia, modern Greek given name, including list of people with this name
