= Fish Information and Services =

- Company type: Private Company
- Industry: Internet seafood journalism
- Founded: 28 February 1995
- Headquarters: Tokyo, Japan
- Area served: Worldwide
- Key people: Co-Founders; Andres Loubet-Jambert; Yasuo Kunimitsu
- Number of employees: 61
- Website: seafood.media www.fis.com – Worldwide www.fis-net.co.jp – Japan

Fish Information and Services (FIS) claims to be the world's largest online provider of information for the fishing industry. It is a privately held company founded in Tokyo in 1995 by Yasuo Kunimitsu and Andre Daniel Loubet-Jambert, providing a broad range of information on fishing, seafood, and aquaculture. According to the publisher, the site – which is available in three languages: English, Japanese and Spanish – receives approximately 330,000 pageviews per month. Additionally, it operates as an online-auction.

== Products and services ==
The FIS website includes over 17,000 published articles on topics from environmental issues to changes in the market. Its news stories are updated by journalists from different parts of the world.

The site also has a section dedicated to buying and selling goods. Goods are traded in four main categories: seafood, aquaculture, fishing vessels and machinery. Subscribing companies can advertise and sell goods. Non-subscribers can view the trading market. The trading market receives up to 100,000 views per month, according to the company. The service also offers market reports, market prices and industry news.

The Market Prices section is updated using information from fish markets from around the world. This includes weekly maximum and minimum prices for each species. The section also includes currency conversion and graphing capabilities.

In 2001, the company set up an office in Agadir to cover Africa and the Middle East, publishing fishery information in Arabic. In 2006, they set up an office in Rangoon to cover South East Asia. This is located in the same office as the Myanmar Fisheries Federation, because it holds regular weekly meetings which provide a forum for information exchange between fishery entrepreneurs and the government Department of Fisheries.
