= John Eyler =

American historian

John M Eyler is an eminent author, academic and historian. He has an Emeritus position at the University of Minnesota.

He has a B.A. in history (University of Maryland, 1966) and a Ph.D. in the history of science (University of Wisconsin–Madison, 1971).

He worked on the history of medicine sponsored by the National Institutes of Health and the Josiah Macy, Jr. Foundation, after which he taught for a year at Northwestern University. In 1974, he joined the History of Medicine Program at Minnesota.

His interests lie at the intersection of scientific expertise and modern society, particularly in public health and health care and the history of epidemiology and public health. He is currently studying 20th century influenza research.

== Publications ==
- 1979: Victorian Social Medicine: The Ideas and Methods of William Farr (Baltimore: Johns Hopkins Univ. Pr.)
- 1997: Sir Arthur Newsholme and State Medicine, 1885-1935 (CUP).
