= Effie Wilder =

American novelist

Effie Leland Wilder (August 28, 1909 – July 19, 2007) was an American homemaker and writer. The first book she wrote was published when she was 85 years old, it was titled Out to Pasture.

== Personal life ==
She was born on August 28, 1909, in Rockingham, North Carolina, USA, to Effie Williams Leland and Warren Allston Leland. She graduated from Converse College.

She married Allison F. P. Wilder and had one daughter, Frances Townsend, and three sons, Allison F. P. Wilder, Jr., John A. L. Wilder, and W. Leland Wilder. She had seven grandchildren and six great-grandchildren.

She died July 19, 2007, in Summerville, South Carolina at age 97.

== Career as author ==
Wilder authored five books: Older But Wilder, Out To Pasture, One More Time, Over What Hill? and Oh, My Goodness!. Published when Wilder was 85 years old, her first book Out to Pasture received good reviews from The Christian Science Monitor.

== Activities and honors ==
Wilder served on the board of directors for the Lowcountry Red Cross for 16 years, Timrod Library for 15 years, the Dorchester County Library for 17 years and Summerville Meals on Wheels. She was an honorary Lifetime Member of Women of the Church at Summerville Presbyterian Church, former officer of the Summerville Preservation Society, and a member of the National Society of Colonial Dames in South Carolina.

She received the Distinguished Alumna Award from Converse College in 1982.

South Carolina Governor Jim Hodges proclaimed August 28, 2001 as Effie Wilder Day. She was also a recipient of the Order of the Palmetto.

== See also ==
- Late bloomer
