= Lake Effie =

- Location within Florida Location within the United States
- Location: west side of Lake Wales, Florida, in Polk County, Florida
- Coordinates: 27.9086°N 81.6076°W
- Type: natural freshwater lake
- Basin countries: United States
- Max. length: 3,045 ft (928 m)
- Max. width: 1,995 ft (608 m)
- Surface area: 105 acres (42 ha)
- Average depth: 3.5 ft (1 m)
- Max. depth: 34 ft (10 m)
- Surface elevation: 115 ft (35 m)

Lake Effie is a very irregularly-shaped lake just west of Highway US 27, on the west edge of Lake Wales, Florida. This lake has a 105-acre (420,000 m^{2}) surface area. A cove on the west side of Lake Effie is mostly swamp. On the east side is the Florida's Natural Growers Visitor Center, known as the Grove House. Florida's Natural has a large citrus processing plant east of the Grove House, on the east side of US 27.

There are no public swimming or boating areas on Lake Effie's shore. There is public access to some of the lake's shore, so the lake can be fished. The Hook and Bullet website says Lake Effie contains bullhead, blue catfish and bowfin.
