= Effy Vayena =

Bioethicist

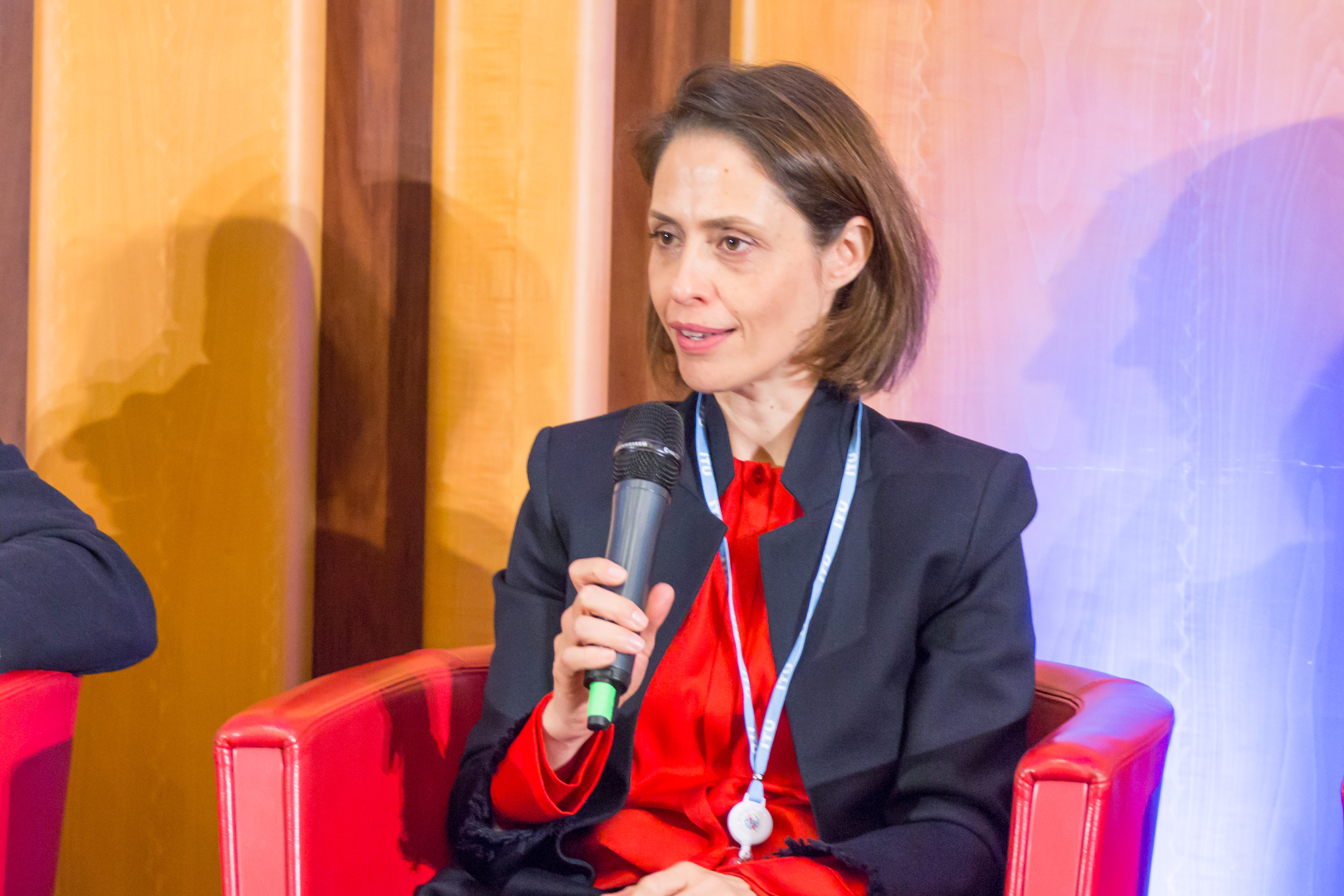
- Born: 1972
- Education: University of Minnesota
- Scientific career
- Thesis: Cancer detectors : an international history of the pap test and cervical cancer screening, 1928-1970 (1999)
- Doctoral advisor: John Eyler

Eftychia ("Effy") Vayena (born 1972) is a Greek and Swiss bioethicist. Since 2017 she has held the position of chair of bioethics at the Swiss Institute of Technology in Zurich, ETH Zurich. She is an elected member of the Swiss Academy of Medical Sciences.

== Early life and education ==
Vayena was born in Greece and grew up on the island of Lefkada. Vayena received a B.A. in history from the University of Athens, Greece and an M.Sc. in history of science, technology & medicine from Imperial College, University of London. Her master's research was on In vitro fertilisation where she examined the impact of new developments and the ethical questions. She then moved to the United States where she earned a Ph.D. in the social history of medicine from the University of Minnesota.

== Career ==
After her doctoral work, Vayena joined the World Health Organization (WHO) where she worked from 2000 until 2007. While there she led some of the organisation's work on the ethics of reproductive technologies. She returned to academia, joining the University of Zurich where she received her Habilitation in Bioethics and Health Policy. In 2015 she received a Swiss National Science Foundation Professorship Award and became assistant professor of health policy at the University of Zurich. In 2017 she moved to ETH Zurich where she was later appointed professor of bioethics at Swiss Federal Institute of Technology, holding the first Chair of Bioethics of that Institution. She is a Visiting Lecturer at the Center for Bioethics at Harvard Medical School and a Faculty Associate at the Berkman Klein Center for Internet & Society at Harvard University, where she was previously a Fellow. In 2024 she gave the inaugural Gay Lecture "Bioethics in the Age of Artificial Intelligence: Navigating Opportunities, Challenges and Responsibilities" at the Harvard Medical School Centre for Bioethics.

== Bioethics ==
Vayena is a specialist in the area of digital health ethics, health data governance, personalised medicine ethics, research ethics, ethics of genomics, health data governance and digital bioethics. She had focused on the normative aspects of independent oversight as well as the procedural principles that should guide independent oversight for digital health technologies. She chaired the WHO expert group that issued the "Ethical Considerations to guide the use of digital proximity tracking technologies for COVID-19 contact tracing" and in this role she considered the role of contact tracing during the COVID-19 pandemic.

== Selected publications ==
- Jobin, Anna; Ienca, Marcello; Vayena, Effy (2019). "The global landscape of AI ethics guidelines". Nature Machine Intelligence. 1 (9): 389–399. arXiv:1906.11668. doi:10.1038/s42256-019-0088-2. hdl:20.500.11850/375277. ISSN 2522-5839. S2CID 201827642.
- Floridi, Luciano; Cowls, Josh; Beltrametti, Monica; Chatila, Raja; Chazerand, Patrice; Dignum, Virginia; Luetge, Christoph; Madelin, Robert; Pagallo, Ugo; Rossi, Francesca; Schafer, Burkhard; Valcke, Peggy; Vayena, Effy (2018-12-01). "AI4People—An Ethical Framework for a Good AI Society: Opportunities, Risks, Principles, and Recommendations". Minds and Machines. 28 (4): 689–707. doi:10.1007/s11023-018-9482-5. ISSN 1572-8641. PMC 6404626. PMID 30930541.
- Ienca, Marcello; Vayena, Effy (2020). "On the responsible use of digital data to tackle the COVID-19 pandemic". Nature Medicine. 26 (4): 463–464. doi:10.1038/s41591-020-0832-5. ISSN 1078-8956. PMC 7100462. PMID 32284619.
- Vayena, Effy; Salathé, Marcel; Madoff, Lawrence C.; Brownstein, John S. (2015-02-09). "Ethical Challenges of Big Data in Public Health". PLOS Computational Biology. 11 (2) e1003904. Bibcode:2015PLSCB..11E3904V. doi:10.1371/journal.pcbi.1003904. ISSN 1553-7358. PMC 4321985. PMID 25664461.
- Vayena, Effy; Blasimme, Alessandro; Cohen, I. Glenn (2018-11-06). "Machine learning in medicine: Addressing ethical challenges". PLOS Medicine. 15 (11) e1002689. doi:10.1371/journal.pmed.1002689. ISSN 1549-1676. PMC 6219763. PMID 30399149.

== Awards and honors ==
She is an elected member of the Swiss Academy of Medical Sciences.
