= Efi Arazi =

- אפי ארזי
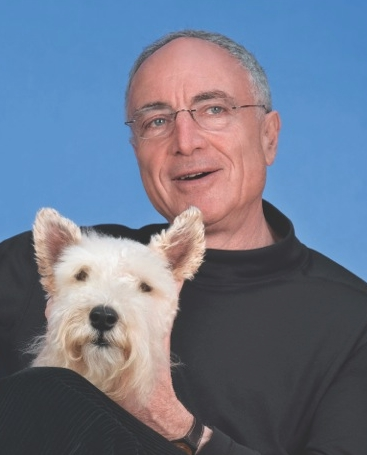
- Born: Efraim R. Arazi; 14 April 1937
- Died: 14 April 2013 (aged 76)
- Education: Massachusetts Institute of Technology
- Occupation: High Tech Entrepreneur
- Employer: Seerun Ltd.
- Title: Chairman

Efraim R. "Efi" Arazi (Hebrew: אפי ארזי; 14 April 1937 – 14 April 2013) was an Israeli technology pioneer and businessman.

== Education ==
Arazi enrolled as a cadet to study electronics in the Israel Defense Forces at the Air Force Technological Academy, He earned an engineering degree in the 1960s at the Massachusetts Institute of Technology. (he was accepted to MIT via the "extraordinary cases" as he did not have a matriculation certificate).

== Business career ==
Arazi began his career in the United States. He returned to Israel in June 1967. In 1968 he founded and headed Scitex Corporation (renamed Scailex Corporation in 2005), an Israel-based multi-national company that specialized in developing and manufacturing hardware and software for the graphics design, printing, and publishing markets. It was the first Israeli high-tech firm, and at its peak employed 4,000 people. Arazi stepped down as CEO and president of Scitex on 1 June 1988, but continued to serve as chairman of the board of directors of the company (a position to which he had been appointed on 1 May 1985) until 18 January 1989, when Robert Maxwell's Mirror Group acquired a 27% stake in the company and Maxwell was appointed chairman.

In 1988 Arazi founded EFI - Electronics for Imaging. He later became CEO of iMedia, a developer of tools for cable, satellite, and terrestrial television operators to manage compressed digital video.

At the time of his death, Arazi was chairman of Seerun Ltd.

== The term "computer art" ==
On the title page of the magazine Computers and Automation, January 1963, Edmund Berkeley published a picture by Efraim Arazi from 1962, coining for it the term "computer art." This picture inspired him to initiate the first Computer Art Contest in 1963. The annual contest was a key point in the development of computer art up to the year 1973.

== The Efi Arazi School of Computer Science ==
The Efi Arazi School of Computer Science is part of IDC (Interdisciplinary Center in Herzliya), Israel's first private university. The school was founded in 1996, and named after Efi Arazi in 2003.
