= Electronics for Imaging =

American technology company

Electronics for Imaging, Inc.
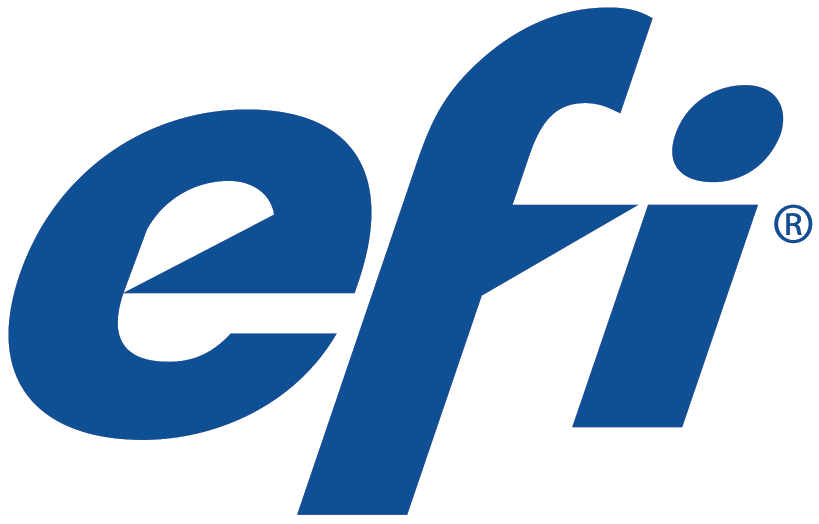

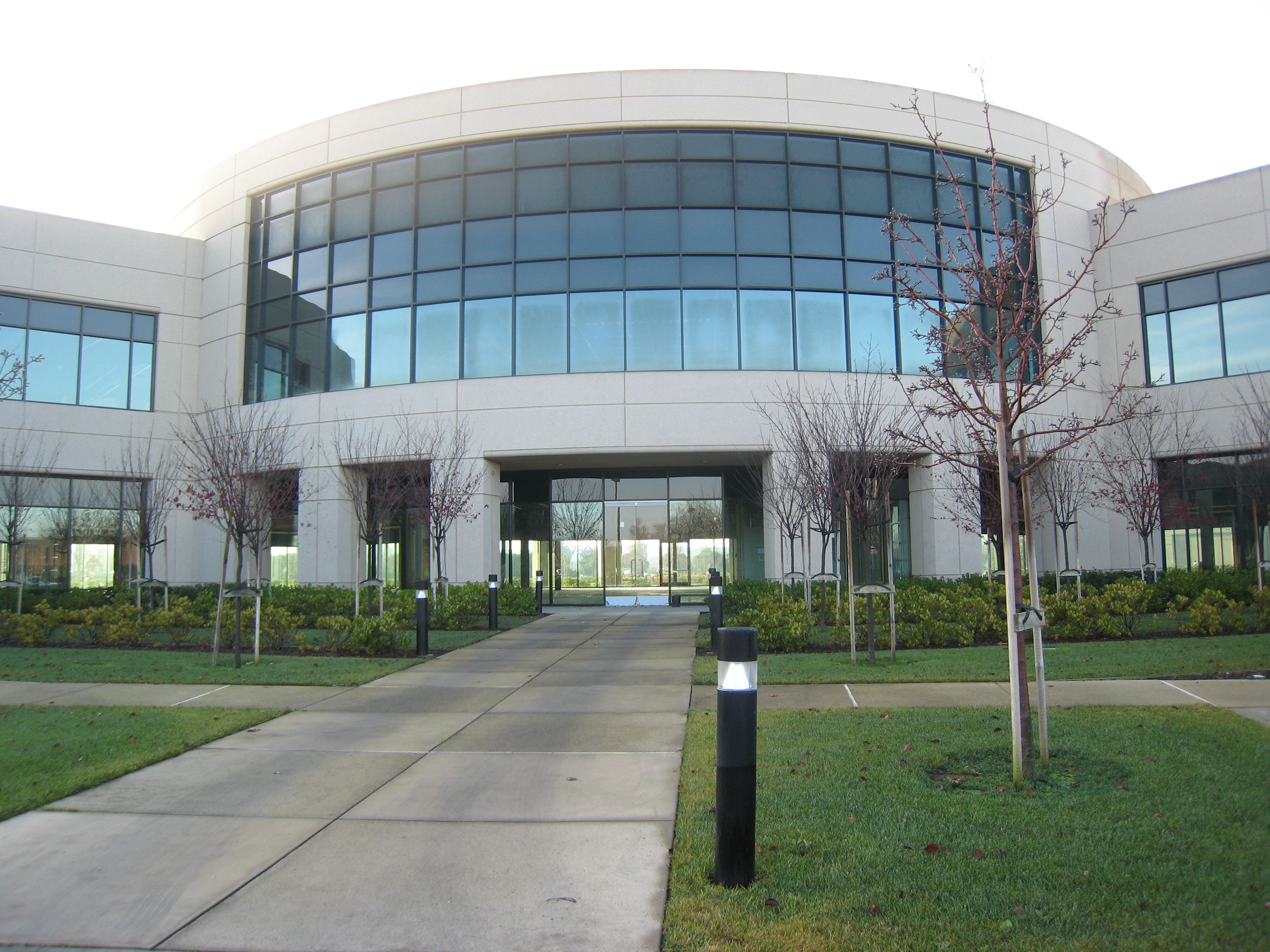
- EFI headquarters in Fremont, CA, 2013
- Type: Private
- Traded as: Nasdaq: EFII
- Industry: Digital Imaging Technology
- Founded: 1989; 37 years ago
- Founder: Efi Arazi
- Headquarters: Fremont, California, U.S.
- Area served: Worldwide
- Key people: Frank Pennisi (CEO); Jeff Jacobson (chairman)
- Revenue: ▲US$ 998 million (FY 2017)
- Net income: ▲US$ 45.5 million (FY 2016)
- Owner: Siris Capital Group
- Number of employees: 3600+ (2018)
- Website: efi.com

Electronics for Imaging, Inc. (EFI) is an international company based in Silicon Valley that specializes in digital printing technology. Formerly located in Foster City, California, the company is now based in Fremont. On July 1, 2015, EFI entered the textile printing marketing with the acquisition of Italian digital textile company Reggiani Macchine. On June 16, 2016, EFI acquired Optitex, a 3D digital workflow provider.

Founded in 1989 in San Francisco by Israeli businessman Efi Arazi, EFI is known for producing the Fiery print server, a raster image processor used throughout the printing industry.

In April 2019, EFI announced that it had entered into a definitive agreement to be acquired by Siris Capital Group, LLC in an all-cash transaction valued at approximately $1.7 billion. In January 2022, the company completed the sale of its eProductivity Software print and packaging software business to Symphony Technology Group.

== Company overview ==
=== Current operations ===
Following the late 2021 divestment of its EFI Productivity Software business unit, Electronics For Imaging had two business units: EFI Fiery and EFI Inkjet. The EFI Fiery business manufactures digital front ends and related software for digital printing operations. It was split in 2023 from EFI and bought by Epson in 2024. The EFI Inkjet business unit manufactures and sells UV, UV LED and dye-sublimation wide- and superwide-format printers for the signage/display graphics market, as well as industrial inkjet printers for the building materials, ceramic tile, corrugated packaging and textile markets.

=== EFI Fiery ===
The EFI Fiery business dates back to the founding of the company and its original digital front end (DFE) product, which allowed users to turn their color copiers into digital color printers. While originally used primarily in office printing environments, most Fiery DFEs today are developed for use with higher-volume "production level" toner or inkjet digital printing devices in commercial printing businesses and in-plant/central reproduction department facilities.

Fiery DFEs are used with toner and inkjet digital production printers, and wide- and superwide-format inkjet printers, from a variety of printer manufacturers. According to EFI, there have been more than 2 million Fiery DFEs sold worldwide.

The Fiery business unit manufactures its DFEs for specific print hardware manufacturers, including Konica Minolta, Xerox, Canon, and Ricoh, among others, providing custom computer hardware loaded with software – including Raster Image Processor, or RIP, software needed to interpret, render, and design files into color-separated images that the printer can produce.

The Fiery business also includes a range of workflow software products for digital printing used to streamline and automate various digital print prepress and production tasks, including color management; advanced prepress workflows; imposition and nesting; variable-data management; and job management between multiple digital print devices.

The Fiery business unit, which has principal facilities in the U.S., India, and Germany, also develops EFI IQ, a suite of cloud-based print management and business intelligence tools, and EFI Self-Serve products. Commonly used in school campuses, libraries, hotels and retail store environments, EFI Self-Serve terminals and software enable walk-up printing by consumers on digital printing equipment. Users can print files from USB drives, mobile devices, or cloud accounts.

=== EFI Inkjet ===
EFI primarily developed peripherals and software used with other companies’ printers until acquiring a superwide-format inkjet printer manufacturer, Meredith, N.H.-based VUTEk Inc., in 2005 for approximately $281 million. The company acquired its main inkjet ink manufacturing facility a year later. Then, in 2008, EFI acquired another U.S.-based inkjet technology company, Raster Printers. That was followed by the 2012 purchase of Cretaprint, a Spanish manufacturer of digital printers for the ceramic tile market, and two companies in 2015: Matan Digital Printers, an Israel-based manufacturer of roll-to-roll UV inkjet display graphics printers, and Reggiani Macchine, an Italian manufacturer of textile printers.

EFI's 2012 Cretaprint acquisition gave the company single-pass inkjet technologies that allow for faster output compared with traditional scanning/multi-pass inkjet printers. That has led EFI into the development of industrial single-pass printers that print corrugated packaging; signage; wood flooring and panels; and fiber-cement building materials. The company also manufactures a single-pass inkjet printer for textiles, the EFI Reggiani BOLT. As of May 2022, the Reggiani BOLT was the world's fastest inkjet textile printer, operating at speeds up to 90 linear meters per minute.

== Controversy ==
=== 2014 California labor violations ===
In October 2014, the U.S. Labor Department's wage and hour division in San Francisco fined the company $3,500 and ordered it to pay more than $40,000 in back wages after it had employed eight people at its new location in Fremont and paid the workers $1.21 per hour to install the computer network. California minimum wage was then $8.00 an hour. The employees, IT technicians, were flown in from Bangalore, India to help with the company's relocation to Fremont and were paid in rupees. The company said it was an "administrative error". EFI's vice president of HR Shared Services, Beverly Rubin, said, "During this assignment, they continued to be paid their regular pay in India, as well as a special bonus for their efforts on this project." She added, "During this process we unintentionally overlooked laws that require even foreign employees to be paid based on local U.S. standards."

Some of the employees were reported to have worked 122 hours a week setting up the network. The day before news of the labor violation was reported, the company posted record revenues of nearly $198 million, an 11 percent increase over the previous year. Michael Eastman, assistant district director with the United States Department of Labor, said that the labor abuses at the company were among the worst he had ever seen, even surpassing Los Angeles sweatshops. According to the Associated Press, CEO Guy Gecht earns just under $6 million, including salary and bonuses.

The controversy precipitated a flurry of comments from local politicians. Mike Honda, Congressman from San Jose and a Democrat, issued a statement that EFI's human resources practices "constitute the most egregious type of wage theft and employee abuse. They undermine fair labor competition among businesses, and if left unaddressed would erode the idea that this is an economy of opportunity." Honda indicated that current penalties are not sufficient to deter unscrupulous employers from engaging in wage abuses, and need to be increased. CEO Guy Gecht, had been a major contributor to the campaign of Ro Khanna, Honda's opponent, but Gecht's name was removed from Khanna's endorsement list after news of the labor violations broke. Tyler Law, a spokesman for Khanna noted, "The inexcusable exploitation by Electronics for Imaging goes against everything that Silicon Valley stands for."

=== 2026 Michigan facility explosion ===
An explosion occurred at an EFI facility in Ypsilanti Township, Michigan in February 2026. The explosion caused the building to partially collapse, trapping and injuring three employees.
