= Concordia International University Estonia =

University in Tallinn

Concordia International University
- Type: Private
- Established: 1993
- Location: Tallinn, Estonia

Concordia International University Estonia (CIUE) was a private university in Tallinn, Estonia. It was established in 1993 as the Estonian campus of the Concordia International University, a private institution established in Milwaukee in 1992, renamed Wisconsin International University in 1995. It was accredited by the Estonian Ministry of Education to offer a bachelor's degree in international business. Its relation with Wisconsin International University was severed in 1996 and CIUE became an independent institution. In 2003 Concordia University merged with International University Audentes. Between 2003 and 2006 as International University Concordia Audentes, it offered academic programs in law, business, media, and social sciences for students studying in English.

In 2007, however, the university was fully incorporated into International University Audentes (IUA), which was offering similar academic programs in Estonian and Russian. In July 2008, IUA merged with the Tallinn School of Economics and Business Administration (TSEBA) of Tallinn University of Technology (TUT), the second-largest public university in Estonia and the biggest in Tallinn. During the academic year 2008/2009, IUA continued to function as a separate unit of TSEBA.

In December 2008, the TUT Council decided to establish the IUA law school as a separate unit within the Faculty of Social Sciences of TUT. On 17 February 2009, TUT Council decided to establish the Tallinn Law School (in Estonian, TTÜ õiguse instituut), beginning 1 July 2009.
