= Diederick E. Grobbee =

Epidemiologist

- Born: 1957 (age 68–69)
- Scientific career
- Institutions: Utrecht University

Diederick Egbertus Grobbee (born 1957) is an epidemiologist and professor at Utrecht University in the Netherlands. Grobbee is one of the top highly-cited researchers (h>100) according to webometrics.
