= Ljubomir Pavićević Fis =

Serbian designer (1927–2015)

Ljubomir Pavićević Fis (in Serbian Cyrillic: Љубомир Павићевић Фис; Višegrad, 6 February 1927 – Belgrade, 25 September 2015) was a Serbian graphic and industrial designer since 1953. According to the Belgrade Museum of Applied Arts, he is Serbia's oldest and most well-known designer.

== Biography ==
Fis worked for numerous Yugoslav and foreign factories, firms and institutions, and his projects are realized in hundreds of thousands copies. One of his noted designs was emblem for the Unispace 82 UN conference.

He was one of founders, professor, head of the Packaging department and President of the Experts Consortium of the Belgrade School of Design, and guest professor at Faculty of Applied Arts.

Fis is a member of "The Applied Artists and Designers Association of Serbia" (ULUPUDS) since its establishment in 1953, and was also a member of several international professional associations.

He participated at International Symposium of Packaging Design held in Zagreb 1962., at Congress of ICSID (International Council of Societies of Industrial Design) in Spain 1971, as well as at the great number of professional meetings and magazines in Yugoslavia.

He was member of juries oat at BIO 3rd International Biennal of Industrial Design in Ljubljana 1968, Octobar Salon i Belgrade and many other. Pavićević Fis was part of the Artistic Council of ULUPUDS, and its Representative in various governmental and cultural institutions of Yugoslavia.

Mr. Fis have realised total designs for numerous Yugoslav appearances at international economic fairs and cultural manifestations in: Munich, Düsseldorf, Berlin, Frankfurt, Hannover, Paris, Oslo, Bruxelles, Milano, Poznan, Plovdiv, Salonika, Tel Aviv, Mexico City, Panama City, Beijing, Shanghai, Hong Kong, Singapore, Jakarta, Kuwait, Tehran, New Delhi, Kiev, Moscow, Aschabad, Tashkent, Maputo, Duala and Addis Ababa.

== Exhibitions ==
Solo exhibitions:

- 1970. Solo Exhibition of industrial and graphic design "Designed by Fis 1961-68", Belgrade, Srb.
- 2008. Solo Retrospective Exhibition "Half Century of Fis’s Design", MAA, Belgrade, Srb.
- 1955. 1st Exhibition of ULUPUS, Belgrade, Srb.
- 1956. 1st Salon of Applied Arts, Belgrade, Srb.
- 1956. 2nd Exhibition of ULUPUS, Belgrade, Srb.
- 1956. Yugoslav Exhibition Art & Industry, Belgrade, Srb.
- 1957. Art & Industry, Novi Sad, Srb.
- 1957. 3rd Exhibition of ULUPUS, Belgrade, Srb.
- 1958. Art in the Service of Man, Zrenjanin, Srb.
- 1958. 4th Exhibition of ULUPUS, Belgrade, Srb.
- 1959. Art & Industry, Novi Sad, Srb.
- 1961. Youth Forum, Novi Sad, Srb.
- 1961. 9th Exhibition of Packaging, Belgrade, Srb.
- 1961. Art in Industry, Belgrade, Srb.
- 1962. 6th International Fair of Packaging, Zagreb, Cro.
- 1962. Yugoslav Exhibition "Visual communications", Belgrade, Zagreb, Ljubljana, Skopje
- 1962. Yugoslav Exhibition "Design of Industrial Products", Slovengradec, Slo.
- 1963. 9th Exhibition of ULUPUS
- 1964. 1st Yugoslav Exhibition of Economic Propaganda and Publicity, Belgrade, Srb.
- 1965. Applied Arts of Serbia, Belgrade, Srb.
- 1965. Exhibition "Economic Propaganda in Yugoslavia"
- 1965. Yugoslav Poster, SSSR, Polska, Czechoslovakia, Romania
- 1966. 7 October Salon, Belgrade, Srb.
- 1966. 1st Salon of Applied Arts, Belgrade, Srb.
- 1966. Exhibition "Economic propaganda", Belgrade, Srb.
- 1967. Forma, Bratislava, Czechoslovakia
- 1968. BIO 3. International Biennal of Industrial Design, Ljubljana, Slo.
- 1969. 10 October Salon, Belgrade, Srb.
- 1971. Poster Exhibition, Ljubljana, Slo.
- 1971. 12 October Salon, Belgrade, Srb.
- 1972. May Salon – Eksperiment 4, ULUPUS, Belgrade, Srb.
- 1973. BIO 5. International Biennal of Industrial Design, Ljubljana, Slo.
- 1973. May Salon – Experiment 5, ULUPUDS, Belgrade, Srb.
- 1973. Exhibition "Political Poster", Belgrade, Srb.
- 1973. Poster Exhibition, Ljubljana, Slo.
- 1974. May Salon – Experiment 6, ULUPUDS, Belgrade, Srb.
- 1974. Exhibition "Belgrade’s Political Poster 1944-74", Belgrade, Srb.
- 1975. ZGRAF ’75 - Graphic design, Zagreb, Cro.
- 1975. May Salon – Experiment 7, ULUPUDS, Belgrade, Srb.
- 1975. 16 October Salon, Belgrade, Srb.
- 1975. Artists of Block 45, Belgrade, Srb.
- 1975. BIO 6. International Biennal of Industrial Design, Ljubljana, Slo.
- 1975. Design ‘75, Belgrade, Srb.
- 1975. Exhibition of Posters from Open Competition announced by the City Conference of SSRN, Belgrade
- 1976. 8 May Exhibition of ULUPUDS, Belgrade, Srb.
- 1976. Exhibition of ULUPUDS, Belgrade, Kraljevo, Nish, Zajechar, Uzhice, Gornji Milanovac, Srb.
- 1978. 10 May Exhibition of ULUPUDS, Belgrade, Srb.
- 1978. 19 October Salon, Belgrade, Srb.
- 1978. Open October Salon, Zemun, Belgrade, Srb.
- 1978. Design in Serbia, Belgrade, Srb.
- 1978. Exhibition of Posters from Open Competition announced by City Conference of SSRN, Belgrade
- 1979. 11 May Exhibition of ULUPUDS, Belgrade, Srb.
- 1979. Applied Art and Industrial Design in Serbia
- 1980. 22nd Golden Pen of Belgrade, Belgrade, Srb.
- 1980. 21 October Salon, Belgrade, Srb.
- 1982. Design in Serbia, Belgrade, Srb.
- 1982. The Exposition of ULUPUDS members in the Yugoslav Press and Cultural Center, New York, USA
- 1982. 24th Golden Pen of Belgrade, Belgrade, Srb.
- 1982. 14 May Exhibition of ULUPUDS, Belgrade, Srb.
- 1982. Yugoslav Engaged Poster, Belgrade, Srb.
- 1982. Contemporary Graphic Design, Belgrade, Srb.
- 1985. 26 October Salon, Belgrade, Srb.
- 1987. 28 October Salon, Belgrade, Srb.
- 1996. 37 October Salon, Belgrade, Srb.
- 1999. 40 October Salon, Belgrade, Srb.
- 2000. 32 May Exhibition of ULUPUDS, Belgrade, Srb.
- 2005. Exhibition of Design Section of ULUPUDS "Bgd Live", Belgrade, Srb.
- 2006. 38 May Exhibition ULUPUDS, Belgrade, Srb.
- 2007. Exhibition of the Design Section of ULUPUDS – ‘Big Spring Cleanup’, Belgrade, Srb.
- 2009. Mixer Design Expo, BDW, Belgrade, Serbia

== Prizes and recognitions ==
- 1960. Annual Prize of ULUPUS, Belgrade
- 1961. Plaque of ULUPUS for Prominent Artistic Work
- 1961. October Prize of the City of Belgrade
- 1961. Yugoslav "OSCAR" for Packaging Design
- 1962. Great Prize on Yugoslav Exhibition "Visual Communications"
- 1965. Annual Prize of ULUPUS, Belgrade
- 1965. First Prize for the Design on Yugoslav Exhibition EKOPROP
- 1971. Annual Prize of ULUPUS, Belgrade
- 1972. Plaque of May Salon – Experiment 4, Belgrade
- 1973. Prize of May Salon – Experiment 5, Belgrade
- 1974. Annual Prize of ULUPUDS
- 1975. Annual Prize of ULUPUDS
- 1976. Plaque and Diploma by 8 May Exhibition of ULUPUDS
- 1978. Plaque of ULUPUDS for Prominent Artistic Work
- 1979. Diploma with Plaque for contribution of Artistic and Organizational Affirmation of ULUPUDS
- 1982. Status of Prominent Artist of ULUPUDS

         Twenty-seven First Prizes on Competitions for Industrial and Graphic Design

- 1993. Charter of School for Design for Extraordinary Merit and Contribution in Constituting and Achieved Results in the First Years of the School
- 1998. Prise for Lifetime Achievement of Association of Artists of Applied Arts and Designers of Serbia
- 2008. Special Acknowledgement by Government of Republic Serbia for Highest Level Contribution to National Culture of Serbia.
