= Effie Mona Mack =

American historian (1888–1969)

- Born: 1888
- Died: 1969 (aged 80–81)
- Education: University of Nevada
- Occupations: Historian, Educator, Author

Effie Mona Mack (1888–1969) was an American historian, educator, and textbook co-author. She is said to be the only person to have received a Doctorate degree in History of Nevada. The Mack Social Science building at the University of Nevada, Reno, is named in her honor. She received a bachelor's degree from Smith College, a Master's at the University of Nevada (1916; thesis, The recall in the making and adoption of the federal constitution of 1787-1789), and a Ph.D. from the University of California (1930; dissertation, Life and letters of William Morris Stewart, 1827-1909. A history of his influence on state and national legislation). She taught at the University of Nevada, Reno, and at Nevada Southern, which became the University of Nevada, Las Vegas.

== Selected works ==
- (1930) William Morris Stewart, empire builder, 1827-1909
- (1936) Nevada
- (1940) Our state: Nevada
- (1947) Mark Twain in Nevada
- (1953) Nevada government; a study of the administration and politics of State, county, township, and cities
- (1961) Territorial Centennial of Nevada- 1861-1864
- (1964) William Morris Stewart, 1827-1909
- (1965) Here is Nevada; a history of the State
- (1968) The Indian massacre of 1911 at Little High Rock Canyon, Nevada
