= Estonian Film Database =

Estonian movie/actor website database

- Website type: Online database for Estonian films
- Available in: Estonian
- Owner: Eesti Filmi Andmebaas
- Website: www.efis.ee
- Launched: December 12, 2012; 13 years ago
- Current status: Active

The Estonian Film Database (Estonian: Eesti filmi andmebaas, abbreviated EFIS) is an electronic film database launched online in 2012.

Its purpose is to thoroughly describe Estonian film heritage, to collect film information about Estonian films, their producers, content, themes, types and genres, directors, actors, and so on, and to make available as much information as possible related to these films and the Estonian film industry. The descriptions of the films are detailed with keywords, which makes it possible to search for information based on various content.

The database was made public on December 12, 2012. As of the beginning of 2017, the database contained more than 16,200 full and partial records of films made in Estonia since 1912. The film database was mainly developed in stages between 2011 and 2022 following a specific plan.

The Estonian Film Database is compiled by the NGO Eesti Filmi Andmebaas, which was founded at the end of 2007 by Reet Sokmann, the film producer of the F-Seitse company, and Hagi Šein, the head of the media department of the Baltic Film, Media, Arts and Communication School of Tallinn University, who were also board members of the NGO.
