= Andrey Efi =

Russian painter

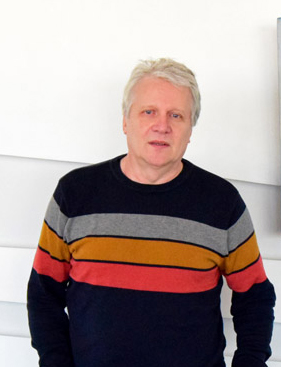
Andrey Efi

Andrey Efi (born Andrey Ivanovich Efimoff (Андрей Иванович Ефимов) in 1960 in St. Petersburg) is a well-known Russian artist, painter and curator. He specializes in paintings, murals, and in graphic and syncretic art, and has also worked on art theory, cinema, literature, and as a teacher. In 2004 Andrey Efi belong the Artconcept festival and then it's revived to ARTZOND festival of conceptual and tendentious arts. A member of the art group Foster Brothers, to which Andrei Kolkoutine and Eugeny Lindin are also affiliated, Efi is the author of the theoretical work PAINTING – CHARACTERS (sources of origination; interrelation), published in Moscow in 1993.

He has since the mid-1990s been producing concept art, completing over 40 projects, including scripts and animated movies such as the four-minute Carefree Princess, whose soundtrack was composed by the American musician Demetrius Spaneas. Other works include Crucifixion dedicated to Bill Gates and the installation Red Cube, later reworked as White Cube and ultimately Eternal Cube, a project that involved 120 litres of vodka. The installations Red Cube, White Cube, Eternal Cube are all dedicated to Kazimir Malevich, as it's started after the idea to revolve all flat squares to volumes. His performances have included "Generation NEXT", "Answer to Chernyshevsky","Talking Stove", "Ill – Each (dedicated to Lenin)", "Between Past and Future", and others.

Efi's paintings are held at the State Russian Museum (St. Petersburg), and in private galleries in Australia, the United States, Belgium, Canada, the UK, Germany, Russia, and Switzerland.
