= Fukuoka International School =

International school in Fukuoka, Japan

Coordinates: 33.5876°N 130.3451°E

Fukuoka International School (FIS) (福岡インターナショナルスクール, Fukuoka Intānashonaru Sukūru) is a PK-12 international school in Sawara-ku, Fukuoka, Japan. It was established in 1972 since the U.S. Air Force Base School had stopped operations.
