= Fukuoka College of Health Sciences =

Private junior college in Fukuoka, Fukuoka, Japan

Coordinates: 33°32′52″N 130°19′49″E

Fukuoka College of Health Sciences (福岡医療短期大学, Fukuoka iryō tanki daigaku) is a private junior college in Fukuoka, Fukuoka, Japan, established in 1997.
