= Fukuoka Dental College =

Higher education institution in Fukuoka Prefecture, Japan

Coordinates: 33°32′40″N 130°19′57″E

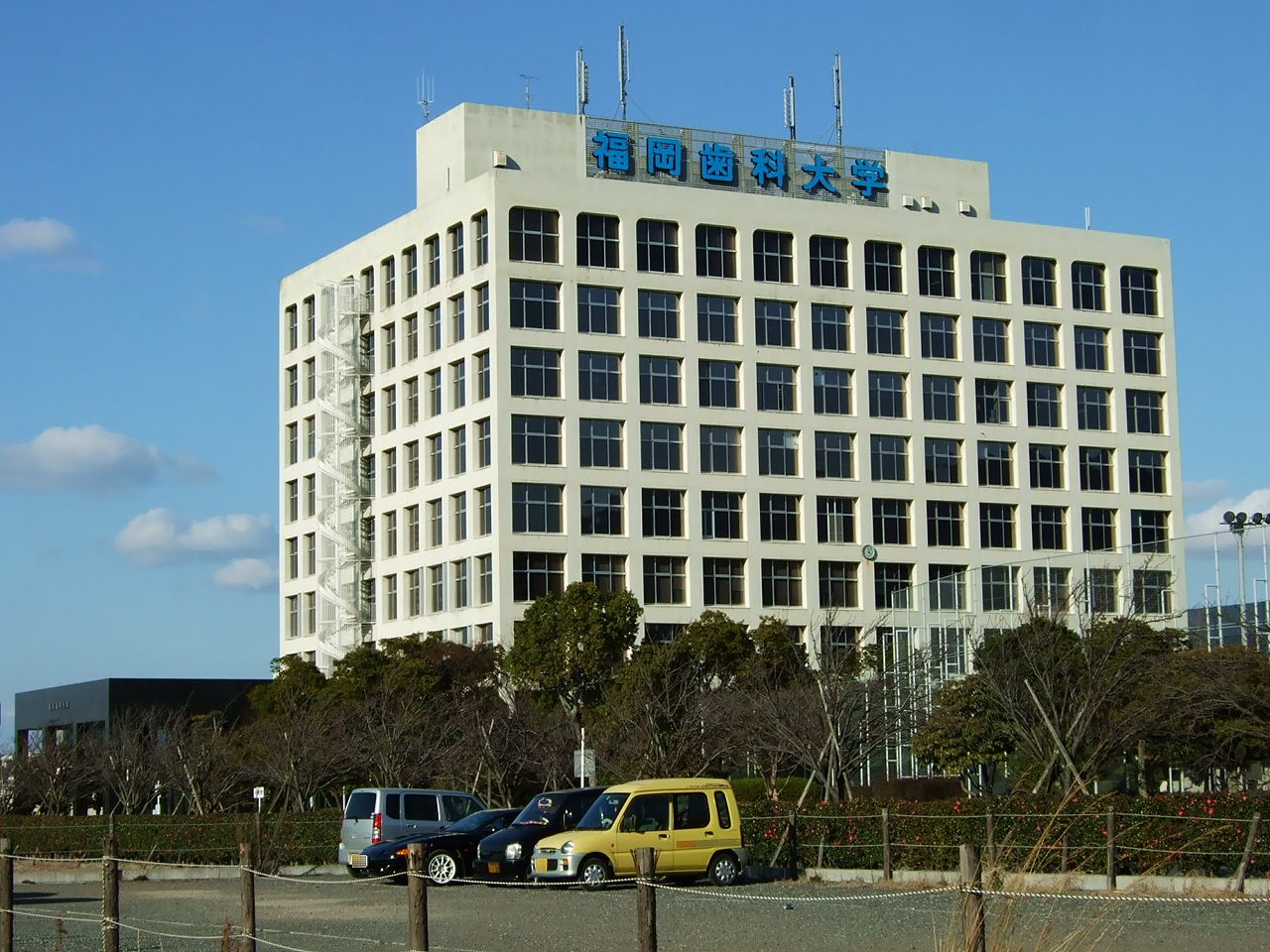
Fukuoka Dental College

Fukuoka Dental College (福岡歯科大学, Fukuoka shika daigaku) is a private university in Fukuoka, Fukuoka, Japan, established in 1973.
