= International University Audentes =

Private university in Estonia

Coordinates: 59°24′24″N 24°43′22″E

- Motto: Expanding international opportunities
- Type: Private
- Established: 1992
- Rector: Peeter Müürsepp
- Location: Tallinn, Estonia
- Website: Official website

International University Audentes (IUA; Estonian: Rahvusvaheline Ülikool Audentes) was Estonia's largest private university, situated in the country's capital city Tallinn.

As of 1 July 2008, it has merged with Tallinn University of Technology (TUT) and will constitute TUT's Faculty of Economics and Business Administration. The full structural merger was completed by June 2009.

== History ==
The number of students in the 2006/2007 academic year was 2300. The programs are offered in three languages - English, Estonian and Russian. Students came from 22 countries and the faculty from 12 countries. The university was built on three academic schools: a business school, a law school, and a school of social sciences and humanities.

All programs on bachelor, master and doctoral levels are compiled considering the international perspective and requirements.

Since the 1999/2000 academic year the university has had the Erasmus University Charter which enables it to sign Socrates/Erasmus bilateral agreements to exchange students and faculty, and to cooperate with European universities for joint cooperation projects. By the 2007/08 academic year IUA had bilateral agreements with 44 universities in Europe.

In 2003 Audentes University and Concordia International University Estonia merged. Since then studies in Estonian and Russian have been promoted under the name Audentes University and studies in English under the name International University Concordia Audentes. The University Government decided in spring 2006 to use one name for the whole university — International University Audentes (from September 2006).

The university was an institution of Audentes Ltd. Besides the university there are Audentes School, Audentes Sports School, Audentes Sports Club.

== See also ==
- Tallinn University of Technology
