= University Medical Center Utrecht =

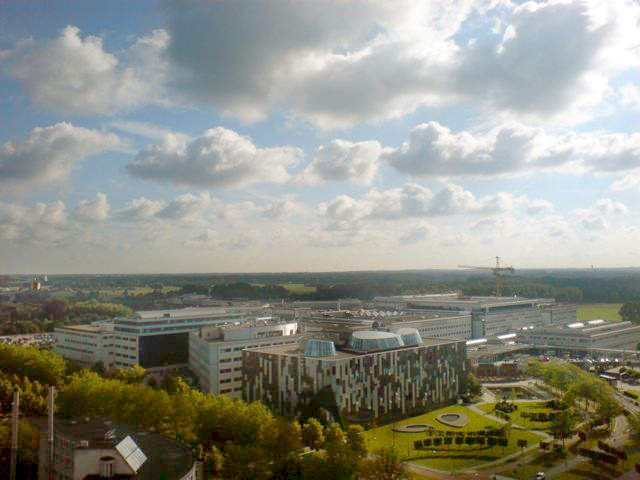

Geography
- Location: Utrecht, Netherlands
- Coordinates: 52°05′19″N 5°10′47″E

Organisation
- Type: Teaching
- Affiliated university: Utrecht University

Services
- Emergency department: I

History
- Opened: 1636

Links
- Website: www.umcutrecht.nl
- Lists: Hospitals in Netherlands

The University Medical Center Utrecht (UMCU; Dutch: Universitair Medisch Centrum Utrecht) is the University hospital of the city of Utrecht, Netherlands. It is affiliated with the Utrecht University. Since the foundation of the university in 1636 an academic hospital has existed in various forms. Nowadays the UMC Utrecht comprises the academic hospital, the faculty of Medicine as well as the Wilhelmina Children's hospital. In total approximately 10,000 people work at the UMCU including medical staff, nursing staff, residents, support personnel and researchers, making it one of the largest hospitals in the Netherlands.

== Special units ==
- Neurosurgery
- Cardiothoracic surgery
- Radiation oncology unit
- Neonatal and pediatric surgery and intensive care
- Pediatric oncology
- Level I trauma center

Adjacent to the UMCU lies the Central Military Hospital, or CMH, for military personnel.

The UMCU also features a Major Incident Hospital (Dutch: Calamiteitenhospitaal). This facility is intended for treating groups of more than five military or civilian casualties in case of major catastrophes, war casualties or in case of particular contagious diseases (for example, repatriated wounded Dutch citizens after the 2004 Indian Ocean earthquake and tsunami).

== Controversy and scandals ==
On November 3, 2015, Dutch current affairs television program Zembla reported on a "culture of fear" in the ear, nose and throat department of the UMCU, that would have led to "avoidable" and "serious, deadly complications" endangering the safety of patients. One case was reported in which a patient's carotid artery was accidentally cut during a surgery. The patient died a day later.

In April 2016 the Healthcare Inspectorate placed the UMCU on warning for poor healthcare and under increased supervision, after it was revealed that additional fatal incidents had been covered up.

In July 2016 it was revealed that in 2015 six patients had developed an eye infection following an eye surgery at the UMCU. Four of these six patients have gone blind and hold the UMCU responsible. The UMCU had to close one of the operating rooms as a result.

In December 2016 it was reported that at the UMCU dozens of women who underwent fertility treatment may have had eggs fertilized by sperm cells from someone other than the intended father due to a mix up. Half the women had become pregnant or given birth.
