= Sawara-ku =

Coordinates: 33°34′55″N 130°20′54″E

Sawara 早良区
- Ward
- Sawara Ward
- Flag Seal

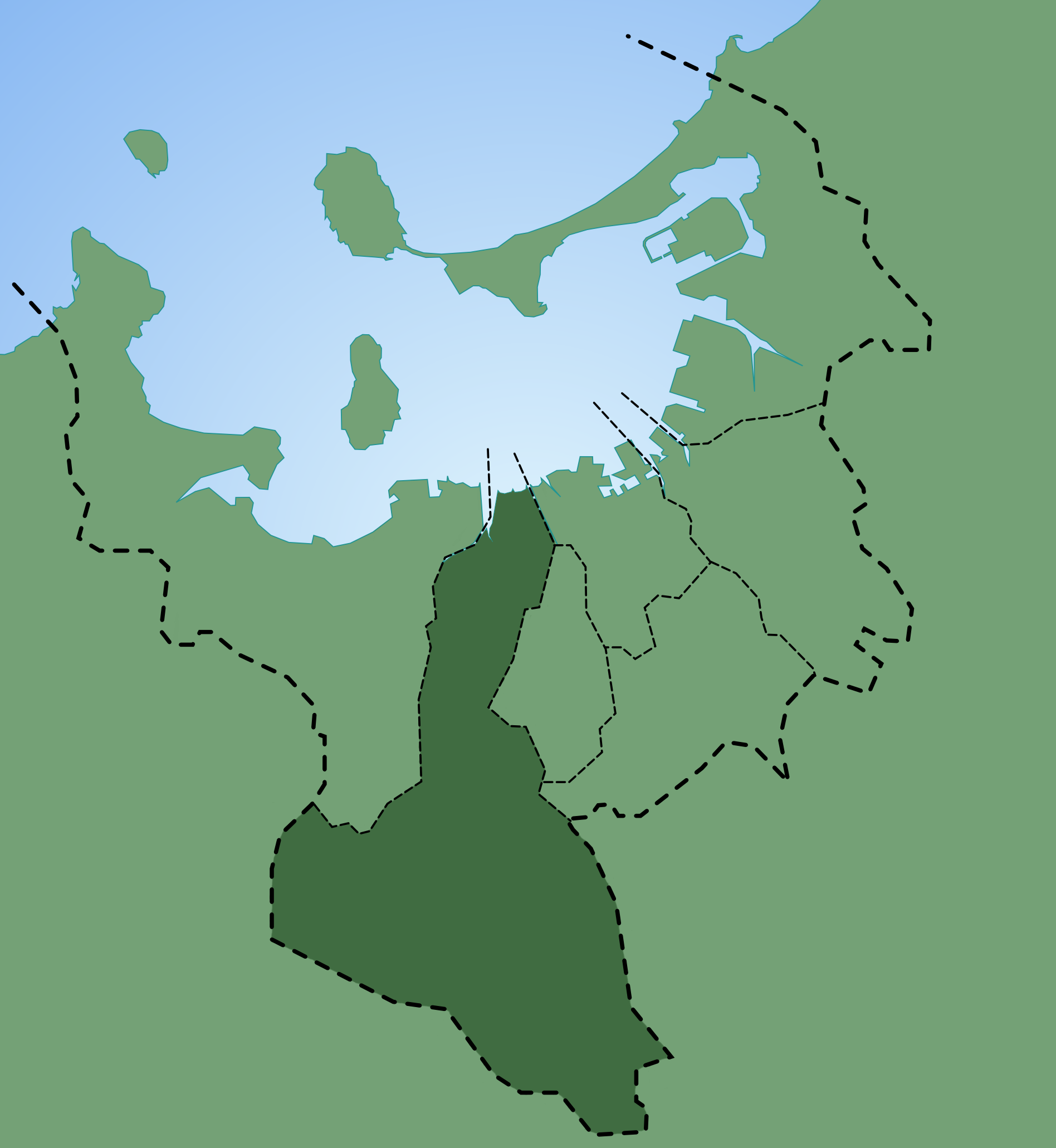
- Location of Sawara Ward in Fukuoka
- Country: Japan
- Region: Kyushu
- Prefecture: Fukuoka
- City: Fukuoka
- Time zone: UTC+9 (Japan Standard Time)

Sawara-ku (早良区) is one of the wards in Fukuoka-shi, Fukuoka-ken, Kyūshū, Japan.

== Data ==
- Population: 213,178 people (as of January 1, 2012)
- Area: 95.88 square kilometers (the largest in Fukuoka-shi)

== History ==
On April 1, 1889, Fukuoka-shi was founded. The northeastern part of Sawara-gun (早良郡) was merged into Fukuoka-shi.

On April 1, 1972, Fukuoka-shi was designated as a government ordinance city. Fukuoka-shi was subdivided into five wards: Hakata-ku, Chūō-ku, Higashi-ku, Minami-ku and the former Nishi-ku. The area of Sawara-ku was the central part of the former Nishi-ku.

On March 1, 1975, Sawara-machi (早良町) was merged into Fukuoka-shi.

On May 10, 1982, the former Nishi-ku was subdivided into three wards: Sawara-ku, Jōnan-ku and Nishi-ku. Sawara-ku was named after what had been the central part of Sawara-gun.

== Places ==
- Momochihama (百道浜): Fukuoka Tower, Fukuoka City Museum, Fukuoka City Library
- Nishijin (西新): Nishijin Praliva
- Fujisaki (藤崎): Sawara Ward Office, Fukuoka Prefecture Sawara Police Station, Fujisaki Bus Terminal
- Hara (原): Aeon Hara
- Noke (野芥)
- Higashiirube (東入部): Sawara Ward Irube Branch Office

== Schools ==
=== Universities and colleges ===
- Seinan Gakuin University at Nishijin
- Fukuoka Dental College at Tamura (田村)

=== Other schools ===
- Seinan Gakuin Junior and Senior High School at Momochihama
- Fukuoka Prefecture Shūyūkan High School at Nishijin
- Fukuoka International School at Momochi (百道)
- Fukuoka Prefecture Kōrinkan High School (the former Nishifukuoka High School) at Arita (有田)

== Stations ==
- Fukuoka City Subway Kūkō Line: Nishijin, Fujisaki, Muromi (室見)
- Fukuoka City Subway Nanakuma Line: Noke, Kamo (賀茂), Jirōmaru (次郎丸)

== Avenues and streets ==
=== National ===
- Route 202 (Imajuku-shindō)
- Route 202 Bypass (Fukuoka Sotokanjō-dōro)
- Route 263 (Sawara-gaidō (早良街道))

=== Prefectural ===
- Route 49
- Route 56
- Route 136
- Route 558 (Hara-dōri, the former Sawara-kaidō (旧早良街道))
- Route 559 (Imajuku-shindō)

=== Municipal ===
- Chiyo-Imajuku Line (Meiji-dōri)
- Nishijin-Arae Line (Sawara-gaidō)

== Rivers ==
- Muromi-gawa (室見川)
- Kanakuzu-gawa (金屑川)
- Aburayama-gawa (油山川)
