= Euphemia (given name) =

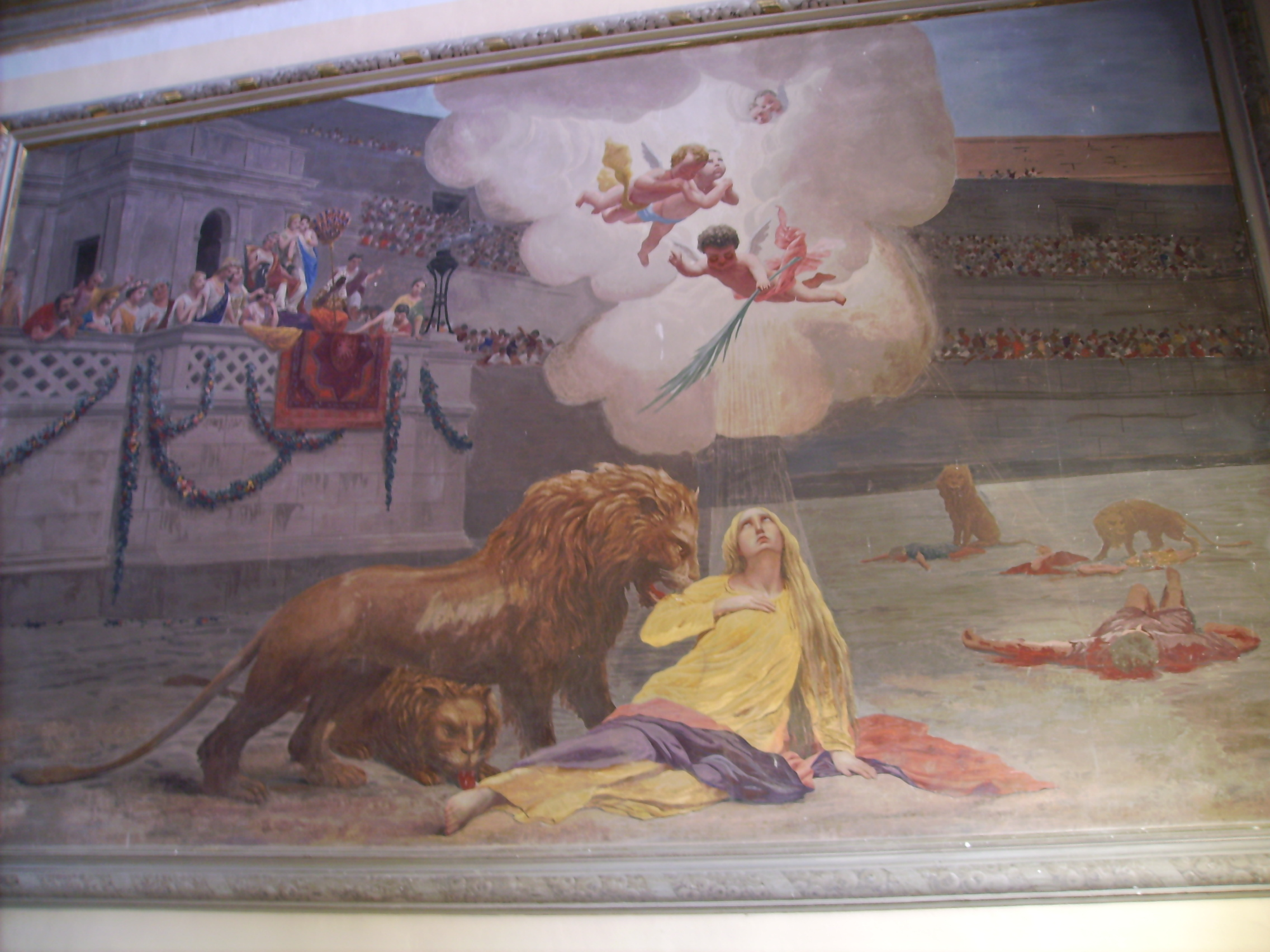
- A Croatian mural depicting the 3rd and 4th century virgin martyr Euphemia
- Pronunciation: you-FEE-mee-uh or you-FEH-mee-uh
- Gender: Female
- Language: Greek

Origin
- Meaning: "Well spoken of'", '"of good reputation"

Other names
- Related names: Effemy, Efim, Effie, Eppie, Eufemia, Euphame, Eupheme, Euphémie, Euphemios, Euphie, Femi, Femie, Fima, Fimka, Jefimija, Phemie, Evfimia, Yefim, Yevfymiy, Yevfymiya

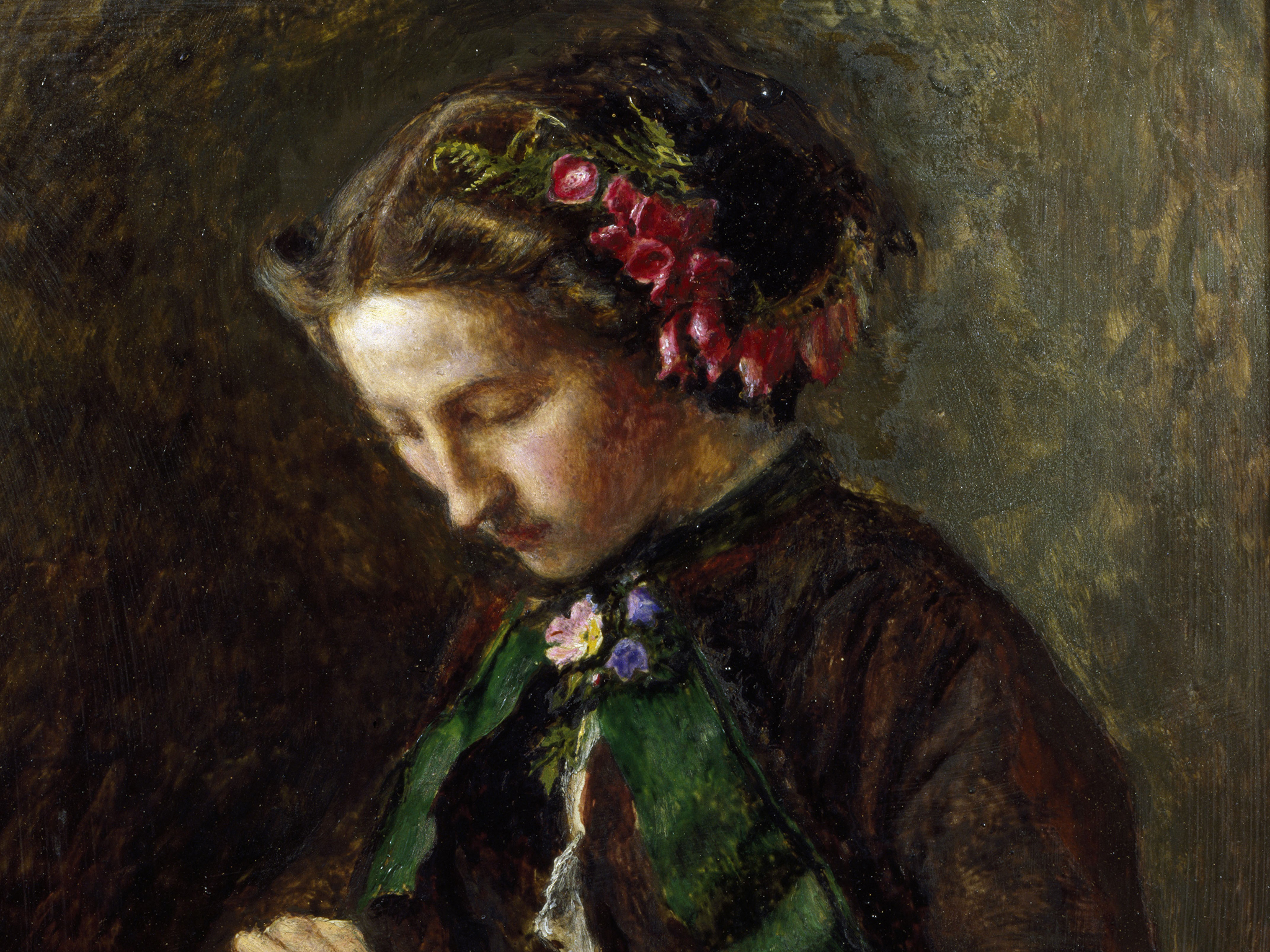
Effie Gray by John Everett Millais, 1853

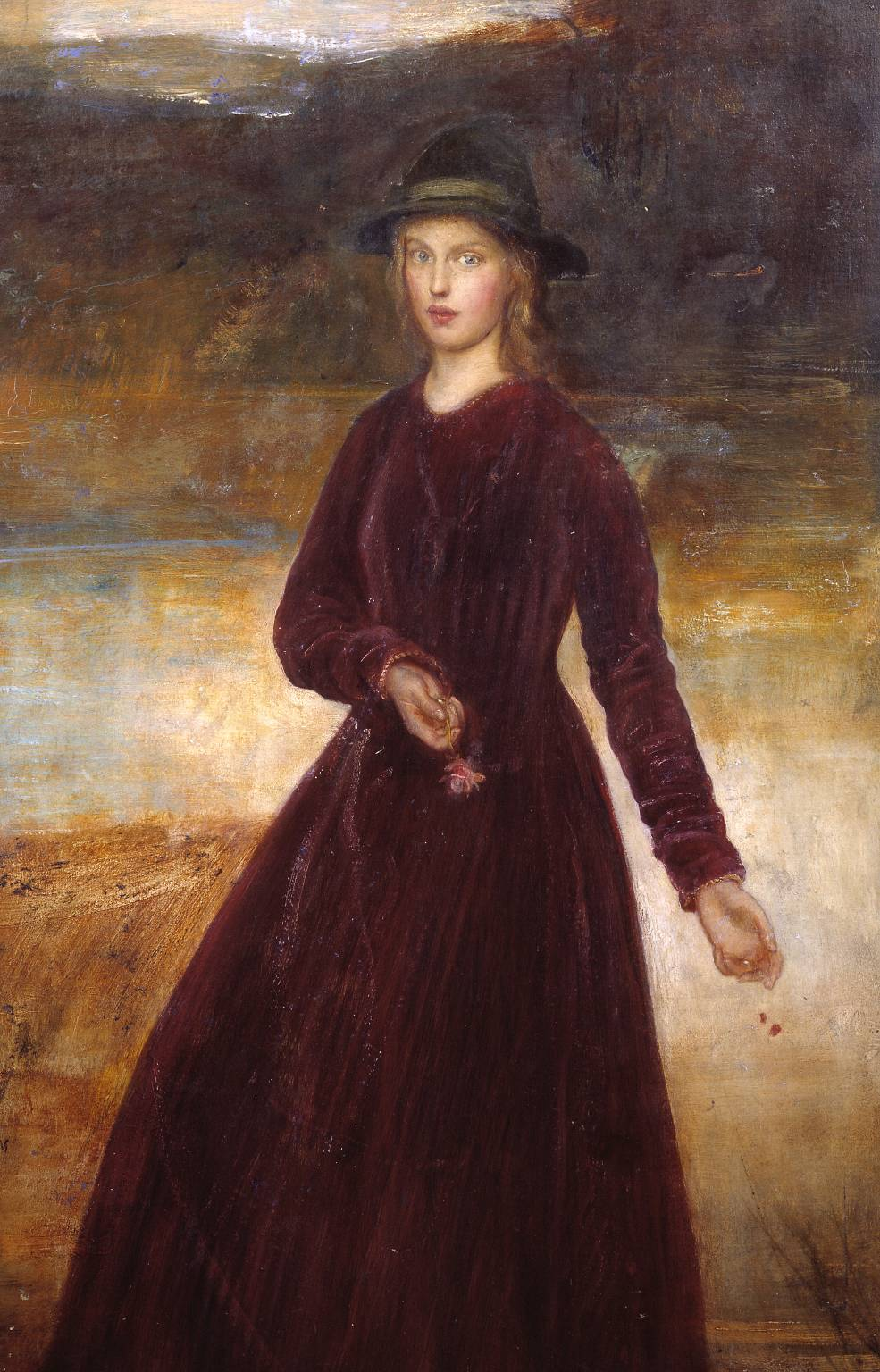
Euphemia Lamb as portrayed by Ambrose McEvoy, 1909

Euphemia, also spelled Eufemia, is a feminine given name of Greek origin meaning "well spoken", from a combination of the Greek word elements eu , meaning "good", and phēmí, "to speak". Several early Christian saints were called Euphemia. The name was in vogue in the Anglosphere during the 1800s and has traditionally been particularly well-used in Scotland.

== Variant forms ==
Effie and Eppie are diminutives. Effemy was an English vernacular form. Other diminutives include Euphie, Femie and Phemie. Other Scottish vernacular forms in use were Euphame or Eupheme. Variants in other languages include the Albanian Efimia and Efthimia, Brazilian Portuguese Eufêmia, French Euphémie, Greek Effimia, Italian and Spanish Eufemia, European Portuguese Eufémia, Russian Evfimia, Evfimiya, or Yevfimiya, with diminutives Fima or Fimka, Serbian Jefimija, and Ukrainian Yevfymiya.

== Usage ==
Euphemia, a traditional name in Scotland, was among the top 100 names for newborn girls in Scotland between 1935 and 1947 but then declined in use. It was among the top 1,000 names for newborn girls in the United States at different points between 1880 and 1903 and then declined in use. It is still in occasional use for girls in the United States: sixteen American girls were given the name in 2022.

== People ==
=== Saints ===
- Euphemia (died 303 CE), Christian martyr and saint

=== Royalty ===
- Euphemia (empress) (died 520s), Byzantine Empress
- Euphemia of Albania (14th century), Despotess Consort of Albania and Epirus
- Euphemia of Hungary (died 1111), Duchess Consort of Moravia
- Euphemia of Kiev (died 1139), Queen Consort of Hungary
- Euphemia of Kuyavia (c. 1285–1308), Kuyavian princess, who was Queen consort of Galicia-Volhynia
- Euphemia of Münsterberg (c. 1385–1447), a princess from the Münsterberg (Ziębice) branch of the Piast dynasty, by marriage Countess of Öttingen and sovereign Duchess of Münsterberg during 1435–1443
- Euphemia of Racibórz (1299/1301–1359), Dominican prioress
- Euphemia of Rügen (c. 1280–1312), Queen Consort of Norway
- Euphemia de Ross (1329–1386), Queen Consort of Scotland
- Euphemia of Sweden (1317–1370), Duchess Consort of Mecklenburg
- Euphemia of Pomerania (1285–1330), Queen Consort of Denmark
- Euphemia of Sicily (1330–1359), Sicilian princess regent

=== Nobles ===
- Euphemia Elphinstone (1509 – ?), mistress of James V of Scotland and mother of Robert Stewart, 1st Earl of Orkney
- Euphemia of Masovia (1395/97–1447), Polish duchess
- Euphemia of Greater Poland (c. 1230 – after 1281), wife of Władysław Opolski
- Euphemia I, Countess of Ross (died in the 1390s)
- Euphemia II, Countess of Ross (fl. early 15th century)
- Euphemia Stewart, Countess of Strathearn (died c.1434), medieval Scottish noblewoman
- Euphemia Fedorovna Vsevolozhskaya (1630–1657), Russian noble

== Other people ==
- Euphemia Eleanor Baker (1880–1968), Australian photographer, and follower and advocate of Baháʼí Faith
- Euphemia "Effie" Bakewell (1870–1921), American bookbinder
- Euphemia Cowan Barnett (1890–1970), Scottish botanist
- Eufemia "Femi" Benussi (born 1945), Italian actress
- Euphemia Vale Blake (1817–1904), American author, critic
- Euphemia Blenkinsop, born Catherine (1816–1887), Irish-born American religious sister and teacher, and visitatrix (provincial leader) of the Daughters of Charity in the United States
- Euphemia Bridges Bowes (1816–1900), Scottish suffragette and social activist
- Euphemia Cunningham (1892–1989), Scottish Medal of the Order of the British Empire recipient
- Euphemia Davison (1906–1996), Scottish dancer and photographer
- Euphemia "Effie" Ellsler (1855–1945), American stage and screen actress
- Euphemia "Effie" Gray (1828–1897), Scottish artists' model and writer and wife of John Everett Millais
- Euphemia Haynes (1890–1980), American mathematician and educator
- Euphemia Johnston (1824–?), Scottish lady's nurse
- Euphemia Lamb (1887–1957), English artists' model and wife of painter Henry Lamb
- Euphemia Leslie (1508–1570), Scottish prioress
- Euphemia McNaught (1901–2002), Canadian impressionist painter
- Euphemia Wilson Pitblado (1849–1928), Scottish-born American activist, social reformer
- Euphemia "Effie" Newbigging Richardson (née Johnstone) (1849–1928), New Zealand landowner and litigant
- Euphemia Johnson Richmond (née Guernsey), writing as Effie Johnson and Mrs. E.J. Richmond, (1825–1918), American author
- Euphemia Ritchie (1862–1941), Scottish craft entrepreneur
- Euphemia Sinclair (1915–2005), British aristocrat and socialite
- Euphemia Somerville (1860–1935), Scottish social worker and politician
- Euphemia LatiQue "Tika" Sumpter (born 1980), American actress and producer
- Euphemia de Walliers (1100s–1257), English nun of Flemish descent
- Euphemia Welby (1891–1987), British Women's Royal Naval Service superintendent
- Euphemia Mary Goldsborough Willson (1836–1896), American Civil War nurse

== As second name ==
- Marcia Euphemia, wife of Anthemius, Western Roman Emperor, 5th Century CE
- Elsie Euphemia Andrews (1888–1948), New Zealand teacher and community leader
- Emilia Isobel Euphemia Rose Clarke (1986–present), British actress, best known for her role as Daenerys Targaryen in the HBO fantasy series Game of Thrones
- Nellie Euphemia Coad (1883–1974), New Zealand teacher, community leader, women's advocate, and writer
- Mary Euphemia "Effie" Germon (1845–1914), American stage actress
- Anna Euphemia Morgan (1874–1935), Australian Aboriginal activist
- Jane Euphemia Saxby (1811–1898), British hymn writer
- Frances Euphemia Thompson (1896–1992), American artist and art educator of African-American descent

== Pen name ==
- Euphemia Kirk, pen name of Mary Church Terrell (1863–1954), American civil rights activist, journalist, and teacher

== Fictional characters ==
- Euphemia, in the 2022 film adaption of Death on the Nile
- Euphemia li Britannia, in the anime series Code Geass
