= Sainte-Euphémie (disambiguation) =

Sainte-Euphémie may refer to:

- Sainte-Euphémie, a commune in the Ain department in eastern France
- Sainte-Euphémie-sur-Rivière-du-Sud, Quebec, amunicipality in the Montmagny Regional County Municipality within the Chaudière-Appalaches region of Quebec
- Sainte-Euphémie-sur-Ouvèze, a commune in the Drôme department in southeastern France.
- Sainte-Euphémie Koleji, a high school in Kadıköy, Istanbul, Turkey.

== See also ==
- Euphemie (disambiguation)
- Santa Eufemia (disambiguation)
- Sant'Eufemia (disambiguation)
- Euphémie (given name)
