= Welby =

Welby may refer to:

== Entertainment ==
- Marcus Welby, M.D., a 1970s television series in the United States

== Places ==
- Welby, New South Wales, Australia, a town
- Welby, Lincolnshire, United Kingdom, a village
- Welby, Colorado, United States, a census-designated place

== People ==
- Welby baronets, created in 1801
- Sir Alfred Welby, English politician
- Alfredo Welby, Italian professional footballer
- Amelia Welby (1819–1852), American poet
- Sir Christopher Welby-Everard, British Army officer
- Euphemia Welby, Women's Royal Naval Service officer
- Henry Welby (died 1636), English recluse
- Justin Welby (born 1956), Archbishop of Canterbury 2013–2025
- Norrie May-Welby, Scottish-Australian transgender social activist
- Piergiorgio Welby, subject of a right-to-die debate in Italy
- Reginald Welby, 1st Baron Welby, British peer
- Siân Welby, English television presenter and radio host
- Thom Welby, American politician and broadcaster.
- Thomas Welby, English missionary
- Victoria, Lady Welby, self-educated English philosopher of language
- Welby Ings (born 1956), New Zealand film director, activist and academic
