= Eufemia =

Eufemia may refer to:

- Eufemia, a Greek female given name
- Catarina Eufémia, an illiterate harvester from Alentejo, Portugal
- Frank Eufemia, a former Major League Baseball relief pitcher

== See also ==
- Euphemia (disambiguation)
- Santa Eufemia (disambiguation)
- Sant'Eufemia (disambiguation)
