= Sant'Eufemia =

Sant'Eufemia (the Italian for Saint Euphemia) may refer to:

== Places in Italy ==
- Sant'Eufemia d'Aspromonte in the province of Reggio Calabria
- Sant'Eufemia della Fonte, a frazione of Brescia
  - Sant’Eufemia Buffalora (Brescia Metro), the metro station for Sant'Eufemia della Fonte
- Sant'Eufemia a Maiella in the province of Pescara
- Sant'Eufemia Lamezia, a district of Lamezia Terme in the province of Catanzaro

== Churches in Italy ==
- Basilica of Sant'Eufemia, Grado
- Sant'Eufemia, Piacenza
- Sant'Eufemia, Venice
- Sant'Eufemia, Verona

== See also ==
- Eufemia (disambiguation)
- Basilica of Sant'Eufemia (disambiguation)
- Santa Eufemia (disambiguation)
