= Euphemius =

Euphemius or Euphemios (Greek: Εὐφήμιος) can refer to:

- Euphemius of Constantinople (died 515), Patriarch of Constantinople in 489–495
- Euphemius (Sicily) (died 828), Byzantine commander and rebel who helped bring about the Muslim conquest of the island

== See also ==
- Euphemia (disambiguation)
