= Epie =

Epie may refer to:

- Epie language, spoken in Nigeria by the Epie-Atissa people
- Gilles Epié (born 1958), French chef and restaurateur, youngest chef to receive a Michelin Star

== See also ==
- Eppie (disambiguation), a nickname or given name
- Eppy (disambiguation)
