= Eppy =

Eppy may refer to:

- EPpy Awards, awarded to the best media-affiliated websites
- Bill Eppy, an American soccer player who earned one cap with the U.S. national team in 1957
- Brian Epstein, a British music entrepreneur who managed The Beatles, frequently referred to as Eppy

== See also ==
- Epinephrine
- Eppie (disambiguation)
- Epie (disambiguation)
