= Euphemia of Ross =

Euphemia of Ross may refer to:

- Euphemia I, Countess of Ross (died 1394–98)
- Euphemia II, Countess of Ross, daughter of Alexander Leslie, Earl of Ross and his wife Isabella Stewart
- Euphemia de Ross (died 1386), Queen Consort of Scotland

== See also ==
- Euphemia (disambiguation)
