= Euphémie (given name) =

- Pronunciation: French: øfemi
- Gender: Female

Origin
- Origin: French via Greek
- Meaning: Well spoken of, of good reputation

Other names
- Related names: Effemy, Effie, Eppie, Eufemia, Euphame, Eupheme, Euphemia, Euphie, Femi, Femie, Jefimija, Phemie, Evfimia, Yevfymiya

Euphémie, Anglicized as Euphemie, is a feminine given name, a French version of the name Euphemia, which is a Greek name meaning well spoken, from a combination of the Greek word elements eu , meaning good, and phēmí, meaning to speak.

Notable people with the name include:

- Euphémie Daguilh (died 1834), Haitian composer and choreographer, mistress of Emperor Jean-Jacques Dessalines
- Euphémie Muraton (1836–1914), French painter
