= Basilica of Sant'Eufemia =

Basilica of Sant'Eufemia may refer to:

- Basilica of Sant'Eufemia, Grado, is a minor basilica in Grado, Friuli-Venezia Giulia, Italy, formerly a cathedral.
- Basilica of Sant'Eufemia, Milan, a church in Milan, Italy.
