= Santa Eufemia del Barco =

Coordinates: 41°41′N 5°54′W

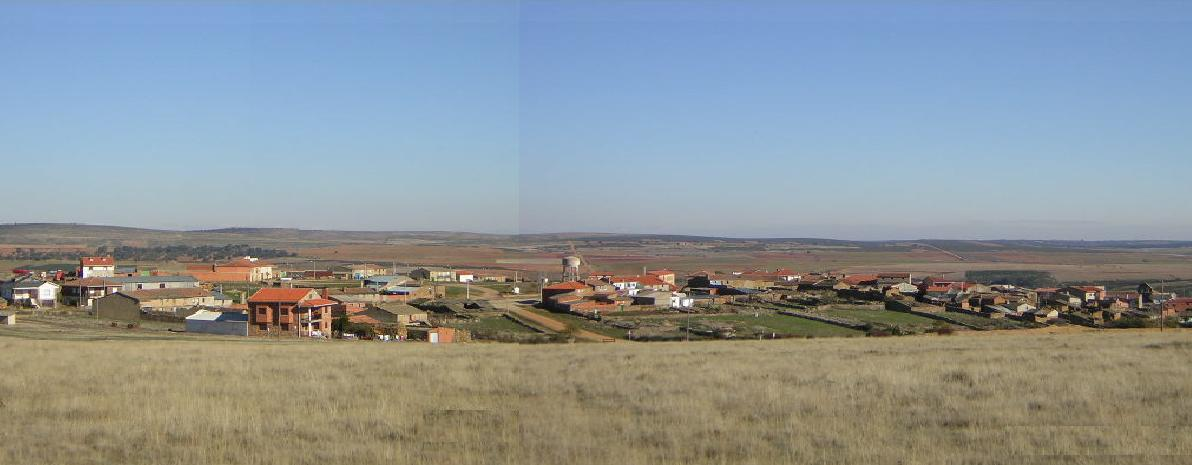
- Interactive map of Santa Eufemia del Barco
- Country: Spain
- Autonomous community: Castile and León
- Province: Zamora
- Municipality: Santa Eufemia del Barco

Area
  - Total: 52 km^{2} (20 sq mi)

Population (2025-01-01)
  - Total: 169
  - Density: 3.3/km^{2} (8.4/sq mi)
- Time zone: UTC+1 (CET)
  - Summer (DST): UTC+2 (CEST)

Santa Eufemia del Barco is a municipality located in the province of Zamora, Castile and León, Spain. According to the 2004 census (INE), the municipality has a population of 279 inhabitants.

== Town hall ==
Santa Eufemia del Barco is home to the town hall of 3 towns:

- Losilla (90 inhabitants, INE 2020).
- Santa Eufemia del Barco (77 inhabitants, INE 2020).
- San Pedro de las Cuevas (8 inhabitants, INE 2020).
