= Eppie =

Eppie is a nickname or given name which can refer to:

== People ==
- Eppie Archuleta (1922–2014), American master weaver and textile artisan
- Eppie Barnes (1900–1980), American Major League Baseball and professional basketball player
- Eppie Barney (1944–2004), American National Football League player in 1967–1968
- Eppie Bleeker (born 1949), Dutch retired speedskater
- Charlotte Epstein (1884–1938), American swimming coach and feminist
- Eppie Gibson, English rugby league footballer who played in the 1940s, 1950s and 1960s
- Eppie Lederer (1918–2002), American advice columnist under the pen name Ann Landers
- Eppie Wietzes (born 1938), Canadian Formula One racing driver

== Fictional characters ==
- Eppie, a major character in the novel Silas Marner
- the title heroine of "Eppie Morrie", one of the Scottish Child Ballads

== See also ==
- Eppy (disambiguation)
- Epie (disambiguation)
