= Frances Euphemia Thompson =

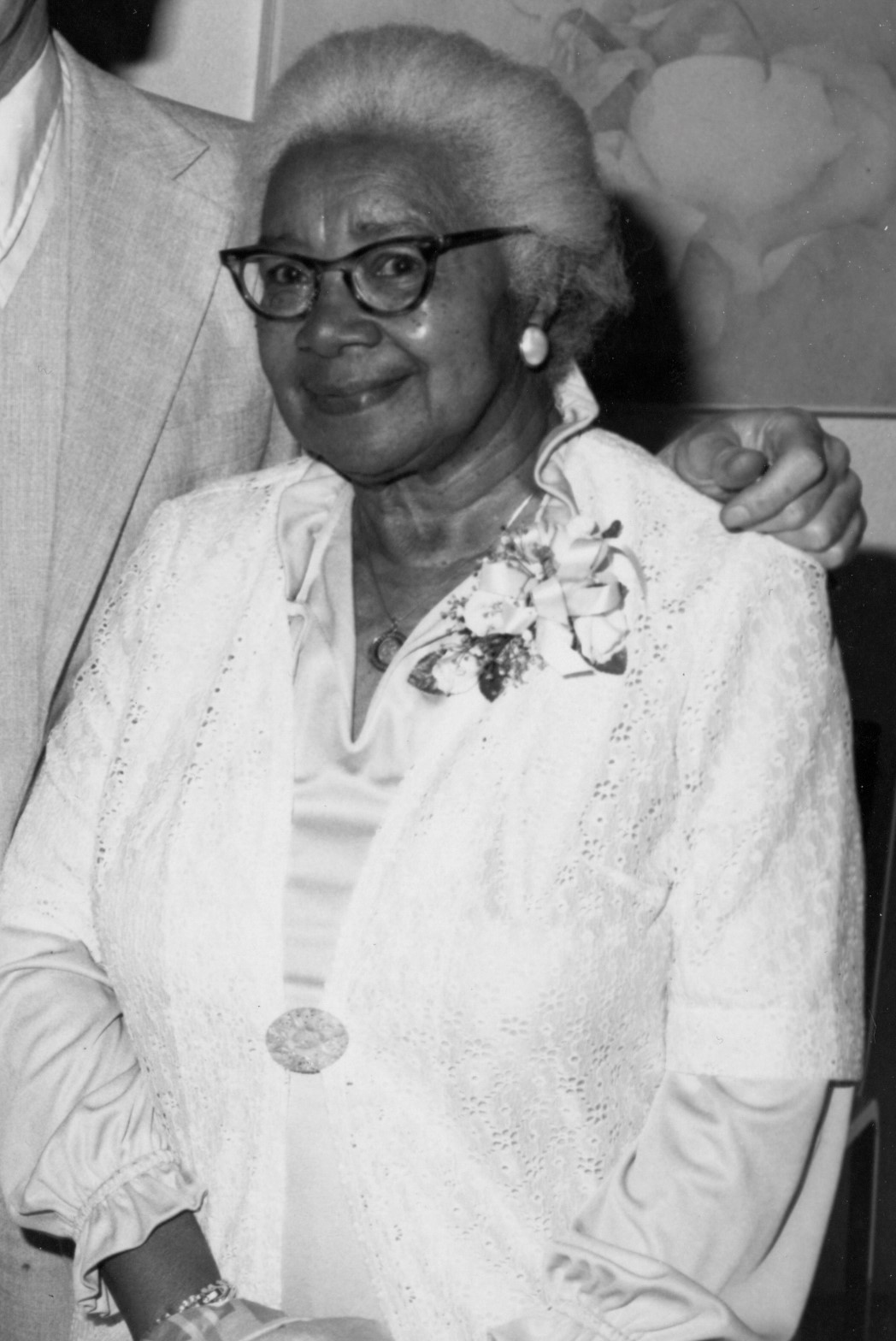
- Thompson at the dedication of the Frances Euphemia Thompson gallery at the Massachusetts College of Art and Design in 1979
- Born: July 11, 1896; Nashville, Tennessee
- Died: January 30, 1992 (aged 95); Warren, Ohio
- Occupation: Art educator
- Known for: Working to improve African American lives through art education

Frances Euphemia Thompson (July 11,1896 – January 30, 1992) was an African American artist and art educator dedicated to improving the lives of African Americans through art education. She was one of the first African American women to graduate from Massachusetts Normal Art School.

== Early life and education ==
Frances Thompson grew up in Nashville with eight siblings. After her father died, her mother raised the children with the help of a family friend and former slave they called Aunt Judy. Thompson attended high school at Tennessee Agricultural and Industrial State Normal School (now Tennessee State University), where one of her most influential teachers was Olive Gorane Taliaferro. Taliaferro had graduated from Massachusetts Normal Art School (now Massachusetts College of Art and Design) in 1915, and became a mentor to Thompson. She convinced Thompson to attend the Massachusetts Normal Art School, and sponsored her education there. She went on to study education and fine arts, at Radcliffe College (Harvard University) and in 1945 was awarded a Master of Arts in Teaching (MAT).

== Massachusetts Normal Art School and continuing studies ==
Thompson attended the Massachusetts Normal Art School (now Massachusetts College of Art and Design), graduating in 1923 from the Department in Teacher Training with a diploma in Elementary Teaching and Supervision. She later returned to the school to receive her bachelor's degree. Thompson was then awarded the Rosenwald Fellowship, which sponsored her continuing education in Europe. She traveled in Sweden, Denmark and Germany, settling in Prague, where she learned traditional Czech silversmithing and lacework. Germany military activities interrupted her fellowship and she returned to Tennessee.

== Artist and writer ==
Thompson's art included drawings, oil paintings, and murals. One of her most notable designs is the seal of Tennessee Agricultural and Industrial State Normal School (now Tennessee State University); she also created the bas-reliefs decorating many of the school's buildings.

Thompson's 1936 bachelor's thesis explored how art programs could be used to positive effect in rural segregated schools. In 1943, it was adapted and published by the Tennessee Board of Education as Art in the Elementary Schools: A Manual for Teachers.

== Teaching career ==
Thompson taught at Tennessee State University from 1923 to 1969.
