= Euphemia Fedorovna Vsevolozhskaya =

Euphemia Fedorovna Vsevolozhskaya (Russian: Евфимия (Ефимья) Фёдоровна Всеволожская; 1630–1657), was a Russian noble, the fiancee of Tsar Alexis of Russia.

Euphemia was chosen to be the future bride of the tsar in 1647, and brought to the imperial court. However, shortly after having been elected, she fainted. Due to political intrigues at court engineered by Boris Morozov, she was diagnosed as an epileptic and thereby disqualified as tsarina. Accused of concealing her "illness" from the tsar, she and her family were exiled to Tyumen (Russian: Тюмень), the first Russian settlement in Siberia.
