= Gilles Epié =

French chef

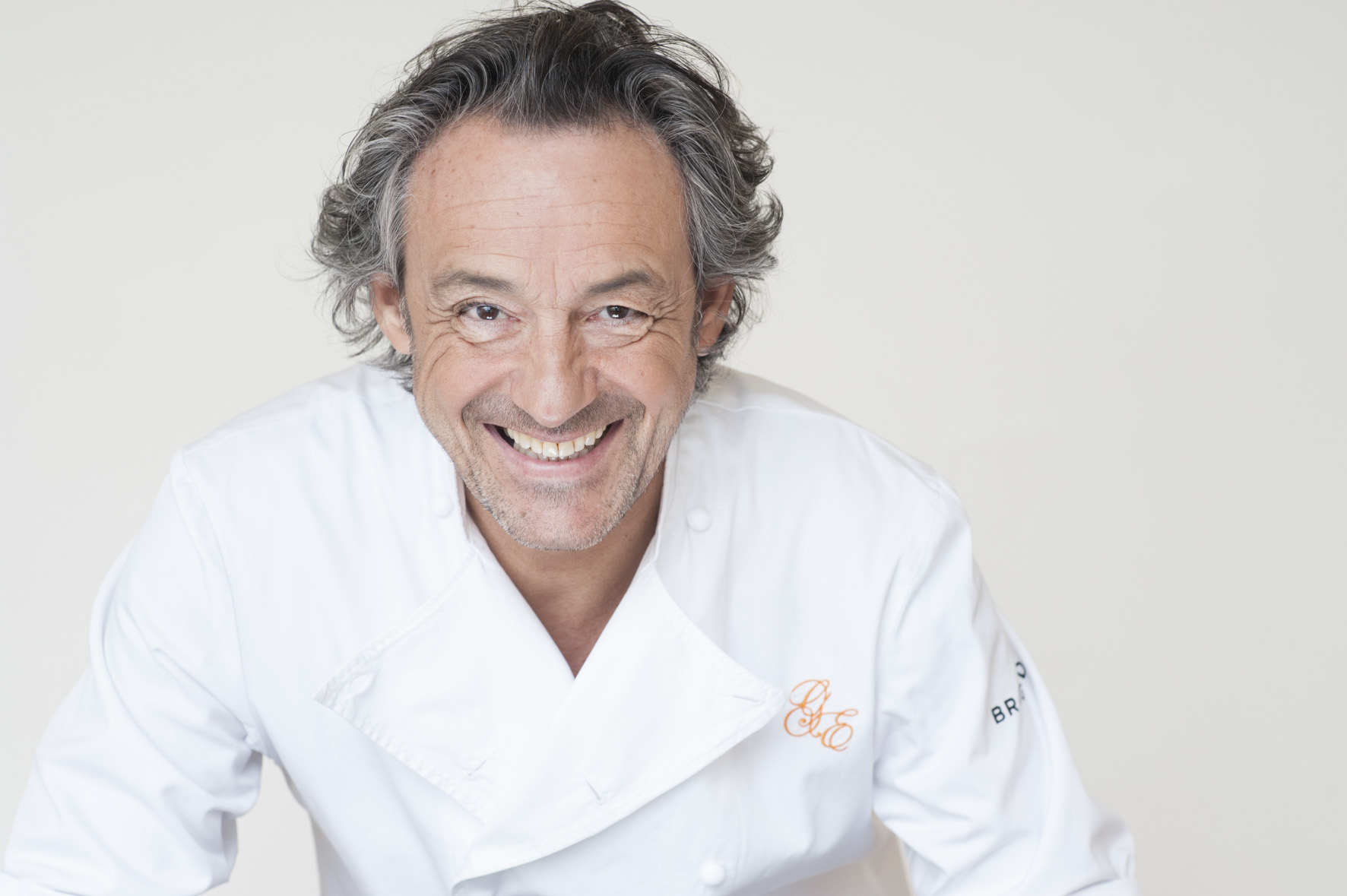
- Born: Nantes, France
- Culinary career
- Award won: Michelin Star Chef
- Website: www.chefgillesepie.com

Gilles Epié is a French chef who was the youngest chef in the world to receive a Michelin Star at the age of 22. He was the owner and executive chef of Citrus Etoile restaurant in Paris near the Champs-Élysées which he operated with his wife Elizabeth from 2005 to 2017. As of 2022, he works as the executive chef of L'Avant-Garde, a modern French brasserie in Georgetown, Washington, D.C.

== Career ==
Born in Nantes, Epié started working at the age of 14 and trained with Alain Senderens and Alain Ducasse at Lucas-Carton in Paris. He received his first Michelin Star in 1980 at Le Pavillon des Princes, near Paris.

In 1995, Epié worked as head chef of the French restaurant L'Orangerie in Los Angeles. He left in 1997 to operate the Beverly Hills restaurant Chez Gilles, which he purchased along with partner Jean Denoyer.

In 2005 Epié returned to Paris with his wife and opened the Citrus Etoile restaurant. In April 2013, Epié opened Frenchy's, a Parisian-style brasserie within Charles de Gaulle Airport's International Terminal 2. In 2018, Epié sold Citrus Etoile, moved to the United States, and became the corporate executive chef at Juvia, Miami Beach. In 2019, he became the culinary director and executive chef of the Montage Beverly Hills Hotel.

Epié also took part in various celebrity chef events in France and the United States from 2012 through 2019. He and his wife Elizabeth have starred in two French shows, one of which featured his restaurant Citrus Etoile.
