= Bill Eppy =

American soccer player and coach

Personal information
- Full name: William Eppy
- Position: Midfielder

Senior career*
Years	Team	Apps	(Gls)
1955–1958	St. Louis Kutis		

International career
1957	United States	1	(0)
Medal record
St. Louis Kutis
First place	National Challenge Cup	1957
- * Club domestic league appearances and goals

William Eppy was a U.S. soccer midfielder who earned one cap with the U.S. national team in 1957.

== Club career ==
Eppy played with St. Louis Kutis S.C. during the mid-1950s when they were a dominant U.S. team, winning the 1957 Amateur Cup and National Challenge Cup. He was the assistant coach for Kutis when it won the 1971 National Amateur Cup and was inducted into the St. Louis Soccer Hall of Fame in 1985.

== International career ==
After Kutis won the 1957 National Cup, the US Football Association decided to call up the entire team to represent the U.S. in two World Cup qualification games. As a result, Eppy earned one cap with the U.S. national team in a June 22, 1957 loss to Canada.

Eppy was also on the roster of the U.S. Olympic soccer team which failed to qualify for the 1964 Summer Olympics.
