= Euphemia (disambiguation) =

Euphemia was a virgin martyr, who died for her faith at Chalcedon in 303 AD.

Euphemia, also rendered as Eufemia and Eupham, may also refer to:

== People ==
- Euphemia (empress)
- Euphemia (given name)
- Euphémie (given name)

=== Surname ===
- Catarina Eufémia (1928–1954), Portuguese peasant who became a symbol of Portuguese communists
- Frank Eufemia (born 1959), retired Major League Baseball relief pitcher

== Fictional characters ==
- Effie Munro, in the Sherlock Holmes story "The Adventure of the Yellow Face"
- Effie Perine, detective Sam Spade's secretary in The Maltese Falcon
- Euphemia, in the 2022 film adaption of Death on the Nile
- Euphemia li Britannia, in the anime series Code Geass

== Other uses ==
- USS Euphemia (SP-539), a United States Navy patrol boat in commission from 1917 to 1919
- 630 Euphemia, a minor planet
- Euphemia (typeface), included in OS X
- "Euphemia", song by Area 11 from the albums Blackline and All the Lights in the Sky
- Gulf of Saint Euphemia, an Italian gulf

== See also ==
- Santa Eufemia (disambiguation) for a list of geographic locations named after Euphemia
