= Euphemia Davison =

- Born: Euphemia MacDonald; 9 October 1906; Townhead, Glasgow, Scotland
- Died: 26 November 1996 (aged 90); Glasgow, Scotland
- Other names: May Moxon
- Occupations: Dancer and choreographer
- Spouse: Edward William Davison (m. 1937)
- Children: 1

Euphemia Davison (née MacDonald; 9 October 1906—26 November 1996), also known by the stage name May Moxon), was a dancer and choreographer. Her stage name is thought to have been taken from her grandmother May and uncle Harold Moxon, an acrobat.

== Early life ==
Davison began her dance career performing with her mother Martha McCandlish and her brothers as 'The Four McLeans' at venues across Scotland.

== Car accident ==
Injuries sustained in a serious car accident on returning from a dance show in north east Scotland ended her dance career in 1934. Her legs were badly injured, but she refused to let the surgeons amputate as she was determined to continue a career in dance.

== The May Moxon Dancers ==
After her accident, Davison formed a dance troupe named 'The May Moxon Dancers'. They were deemed a success. She went on to form many more troupes who performed under various stage names including the 'Moxon Girls', 'Moxon Ladies' and 'May Moxon Lovelies' until her retirement in the 1970s.

== Personal life ==
Euphemia married Edward William Davison in Maryhill in 1937, and had one son.

She died on 26 November 1996.
