= Piergiorgio Welby =

Italian poet, painter, and activist (1945–2006)

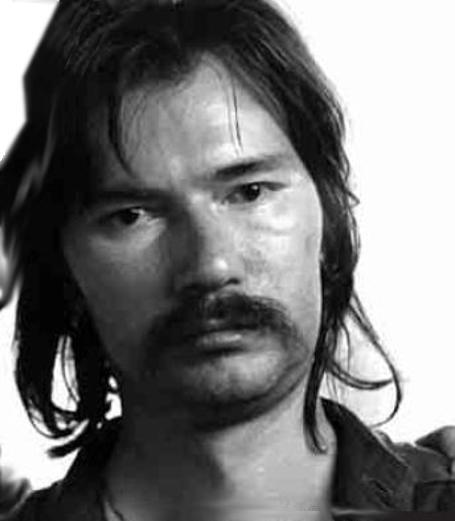
- Born: 26 December 1945; Rome, Italy
- Died: 20 December 2006 (aged 60); Rome, Italy
- Occupations: Poet; painter; blogger; euthanasia activist
- Spouse: Mina Welby
- Father: Alfredo Welby

Piergiorgio Welby (26 December 1945 – 20 December 2006) was an Italian poet, painter and activist whose three-month-long battle to establish his right to die led to a debate about euthanasia in his country.

Welby was diagnosed with muscular dystrophy as a teenager in the early 1960s. The disease progressed, and in 1997 he became unable to breathe on his own. He became politically active in the right-to-die movement, and in 2006 he publicly declared his wish to refuse the medical treatment that kept him alive. The case was controversial, with liberal politicians supporting him and conservatives and the Vatican speaking out against his cause. After three months, he was allowed to die, though he was denied a church burial.

== Life and career ==
Born in Rome, the son of Alfredo Welby, a footballer playing for A.S. Roma, Welby was diagnosed with muscular dystrophy at the age of 17.

During the 1960s, he became influenced by the hippie movement, extensively travelling throughout Europe from 1969 to 1971 and using drugs to help forget his disease; back in Italy, he devoted his life to poetry and painting, supporting himself by giving private lessons.

During the 1980s, he cured his drug dependency with the help of a methadone-based therapy which, while successfully detoxifying him, accelerated the progression of the disease, irreversibly paralyzing him from his waist down. At this time, he met his future wife Mina while she was traveling to Rome with her parish.

On 14 July 1997, Welby suffered a respiratory insufficiency that left him completely unable to breathe naturally. He depended on mechanical ventilation and artificial feeding and communicated through a speech-synthesizer.

== Activism ==
The last years of his life were marked by activism. He joined the Italian Radical Party and later the Associazione Luca Coscioni, which named him co-president in 2006, a group with close ties to the Radical Party, that advocates euthanasia, free access to assistive technology and freedom of scientific research. Welby used the Internet as his primary mean of communication by posting on web forums and, since 2003, on his own blog.

On 1 May 2002 he posted a message with the title Eutanasia (Italian for euthanasia) on Radical Party's on line forum, writing: "Everything still? Worse than the desert of the Tartars. ... while staring at the horizon. ... terminal patients like me. ... envy the Dutch people. ... WAKE UP" As of January 2007, the thread received over 20,000 replies.

In April 2003 he opened a blog, expressing his views on different topics, commenting on current political events and publishing small poems. Since his death, the blog has been maintained by his widow.

In May 2005, on the occasion of a referendum dealing, among other topics, with the use of human embryos for stem cell research, he specifically asked his fellow Radical Party members to take him to his local polling station, after his request to let disabled people who depend on life-support machinery to vote in their homes was denied.

In April 2006, a worsening of his muscular dystrophy paralyzed the finger which let him use the mouse, making him unable to use his computer and heavily limiting his communication. He decided to publicize his request to die, hoping to start a nationwide debate on euthanasia.

== Battle for euthanasia ==
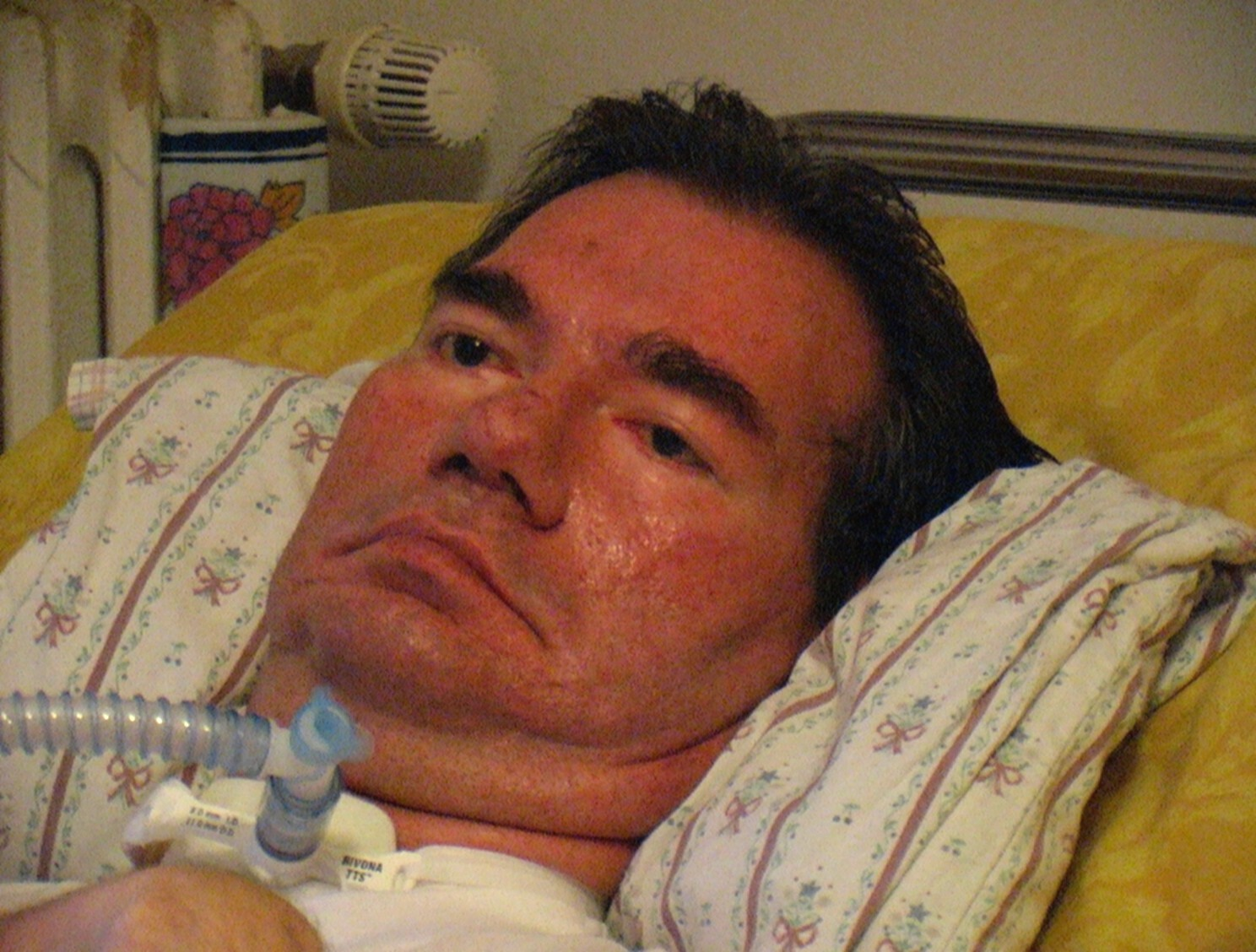
Welby in late 2006

On 22 September 2006, Welby sent an open video-letter to Italian President Giorgio Napolitano. It was shown on national television and made available for downloading on the Internet (see external links), describing his condition and explaining his desire to die. Napolitano answered he felt deeply touched by Welby's situation, inviting Italian politicians to a parliamentary debate on this and similar complex ethical issues.

Welby's case aroused a heated debate, involving political, ethical, religious and medical aspects. Radical Party members supported Welby's decision by organizing hunger-strikes and demonstrations; party founder Marco Pannella declared his readiness to turn the machines off himself as an "act of civil disobedience".

Most Catholic politicians adhered to the official position of the Roman Catholic Church, opposing both euthanasia and aggressive medical treatment. On a televised debate, Cardinal Javier Lozano Barragán declared that stopping mechanical ventilation would only be acceptable if it were judged futile or disproportionate by his doctors. Health Minister Livia Turco said that a parliamentary debate should focus more on improving palliative care rather than on euthanasia.

The head-physician and president of the "Italian Association of Sclerosis Patients", Mario Melazzini, had Amyotrophic lateral sclerosis, a similar sickness to Welby's. Melazzini decided to speak in Rome with other ALS patients, asking the help of the State for the right of such people to life. He declared to the weekly newspaper Oggi that "Only those who want death are listened to". That appeal gained the support of many Italians, including the writer Claudio Magris and the singer Ron. Subsequently, after Melazzini's statement, hundreds of patients (among them notable cases in medical ethics such as Nello Guerra Crescenzi, Enrico Canova, and Salvatore Crisafulli — who was famous for having come out of a 2-year coma) wrote letters to Welby asking him to "fight for his life".

Oncologist and long-time euthanasia supporter Umberto Veronesi and surgeon Ignazio Marino said Welby's right to refuse medical treatment was granted by Italian constitution and by the code of conduct of the Italian medical association. One of Welby's doctors noted that after switching off the ventilator, the code of conduct would force him to take proper action to revive the patient once he reached a state of unconsciousness.

The case was brought to a court which denied the request, finding no specific law governed it and urging Parliament to solve the problem.

In December 2006, anesthetist Mario Riccio contacted Radical Party member Marco Cappato, informing him that he would perform the operation, seeing no legal impediments. Doctor Riccio arrived in Rome and after ensuring Welby's request was voluntary and not dictated by external pressures, decided to grant his request.

== Death and aftermath ==
After the doctor agreed to his request, Welby asked to listen to Antonio Vivaldi's The Four Seasons; as it was not available, he then chose Bob Dylan. The procedure started with sedation at 11:00 p.m. on 20 December and ended at 11:40 p.m., when Welby was officially declared dead. His death was announced the following morning by Marco Pannella on radio; further details were given at a press conference held some hours later.

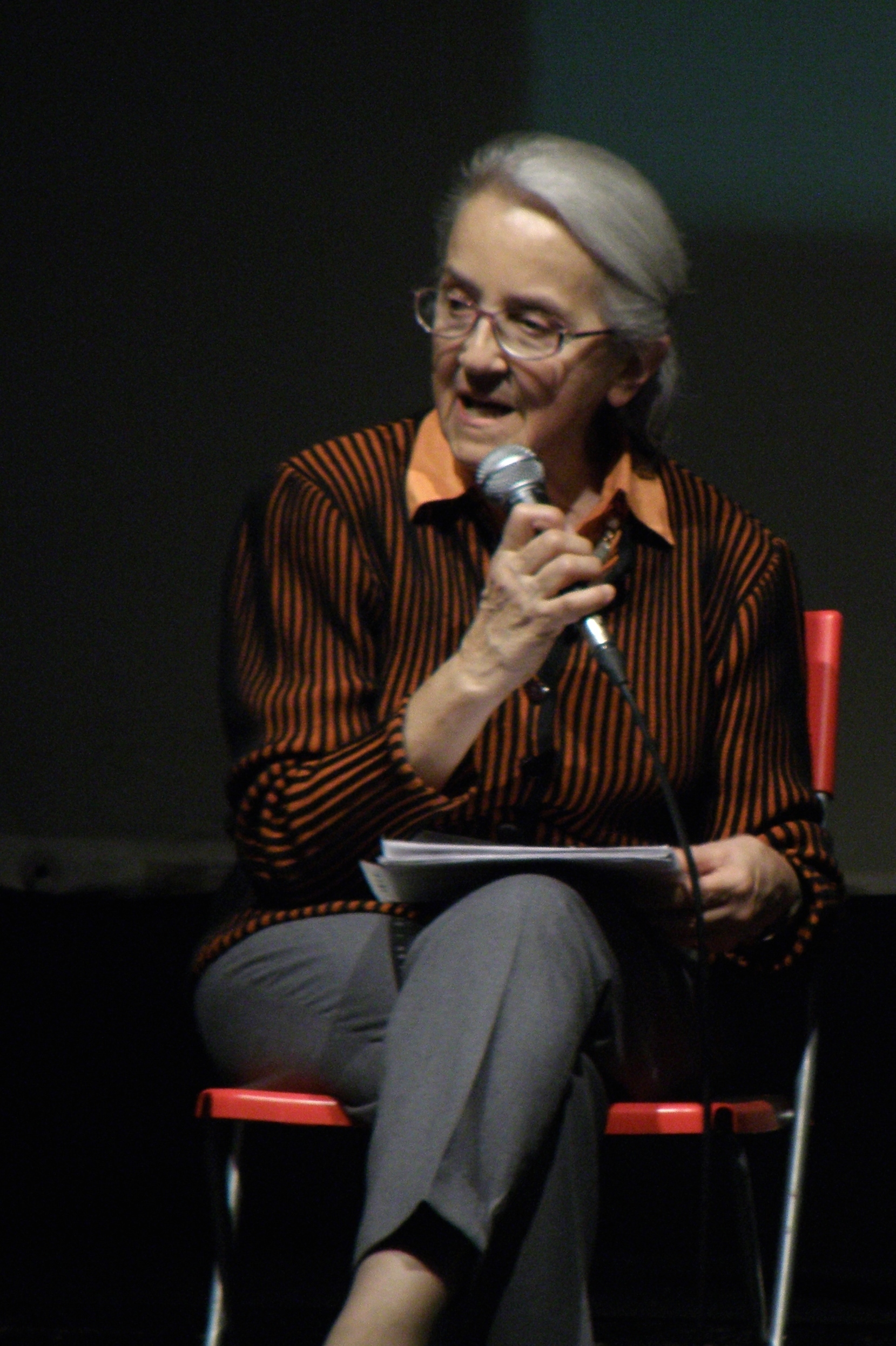
His wife Mina Welby in 2011

Italian politicians were divided after his death. Members of the Radical Party and of left wing expressed sorrow for Welby's death, together with relief for ending his long suffering. On the other hand, members of the Italian conservative parties criticized the doctor and the political use of Welby's case. Luca Volontè, of the Christian Democrats, requested the immediate arrest of "Welby's murderers." Despite strong pressure from public opinion, both the Ethical Committee of local Medical Association and the criminal court judged Doctor Riccio's conduct to be legitimate.

In a controversial move, the Roman Catholic Church refused to allow a religious funeral, officially declaring that "Welby had repeatedly and publicly affirmed his desire to end his own life, which is against Catholic doctrine." A civil funeral was celebrated in a public square in Rome. In 2015, commentators contrasted the church's denial of a ceremony for Welby with a ceremony for Vittorio Casamonica, an alleged mafia boss.

== See also ==
- Terri Schiavo
- Ramón Sampedro
