= Santa Eufemia =

Santa Eufemia may refer to:

- Santa Eufemia, Spain
- Santa Eufemia del Barco, Spain
- Santa Eufemia del Arroyo, Spain
- Sant'Eufemia d'Aspromonte, Reggio Calabria, Italy
- Sant'Eufemia a Maiella, Italy
- Santa Eufemia, Argentina, in Juárez Celman Department
- Gulf of Saint Euphemia, Italy

== See also ==
- Euphemia, the Christian saint after whom all of the above were named
- Eufemia (disambiguation)
- Sant'Eufemia (disambiguation)
