= Sant'Eufemia, Piacenza =

Building in Piacenza, Italy

Coordinates: 45°03′21″N 9°41′28″E

Sant'Eufemia is a Roman Catholic church located at the corner of the homonymous via and Via Boselli-Bonini in Piacenza, region of Emilia Romagna, Italy.

== History ==
A church at the site was present before the year 1000, but only after 1100, did the then Bishop Aldo Gabrielli, refurbish the church temple and adjoining monastery in the present layout. The Church is dedicated to Saint Euphemia, because her relics were supposedly interred within the church. The church had been intended as the burial place for bishop Aldo. In the 14th century, the church was supervised by Canonici Regolari di Santissimi Salvatore until the suppression during Napoleonic period.

After 1100, the portico with pillars Romanesque capitals was added. In the eighteenth century: a Baroque gate was introduced on the facade. The bell tower was demolished and only rebuilt only in 19th-century. The church has a remnant of a twelfth-century mosaic depicting St George and the Dragon. Much of the church was refurbished starting in 1652, when the apse and choir were rebuilt. Among the altarpieces in the church is a depiction of the Madonna and Child and four saints, including Eufemia, Vittore, and Sostene (1512) painted by Cesare Cesariano.
