= Eppie Morrie =

Traditional song

"Eppie Morrie" (Roud 2583, Child 223) is a folk ballad of Scottish origin. The author and date are unknown, and as is common with folk ballads, several versions exist. It was printed in James Maidment's anthology A North Country Garland in 1824. That version is reprinted in James Kinsley's The Oxford Book of Ballads, 1969. Although the lyrics were transcribed by Francis James Child, it is uncertain if the original melody has been retained. The earliest recordings are from the performances of Jimmy MacBeath in 1951 and later Ewan MacColl; a more recent version by Andrew Calhoun forms part of his border folk song anthology Telfer's Cows.

The ballad describes a young woman being forcefully taken from her home by a man named Willie and his companions. Willie's goal is to force Eppie to marry him. She refuses, in some versions because she already has a suitor, and in others because she considers Willie to be unworthy of her. First, Willie takes her to a priest, whom he tries to force at gunpoint to perform the marriage ceremony. When the priest refuses, Eppie is locked in a room with Willie, where he tries to rape her. After a prolonged struggle, Willie finally gives up. Eppie, having retained her virginity and avoided the forced marriage, is rescued by the arrival of a band of armed men, led by John Forsyth. After being rescued, Eppie triumphantly asks Willie to provide her with a horse to return home on. Place names mentioned suggest that the events happened in Aberdeenshire.

== Lyrics of the ballad ==
The following is a version of the lyrics of "Eppie Morrie", as related by Francis James Child (Version A):

Four-and-twenty Highland men Came a' from Carrie side To steal awa Eppie Morrie, Cause she would not be a bride. Out it's came her mother, It was a moonlight night, She could not see her daughter, Their swords they shin'd so bright. Haud far awa frae me, mother, Haud far awa frae me; There's not a man in a' Strathdon Shall wedded be with me.' They have taken Eppie Morrie, And horse back bound her on, And then awa to the Minister, As fast as horse could gang. He's taken out a pistol, And set it to the minister's breast: Marry me, marry me, minister, Or else I'll be your priest.' Haud far awa frae me, good sir, Haud far awa frae me; For there's not a man in all Strathdon That shall married be with me.' Haud far awa frae me, Willie, Haud far awa frae me; For I darna avow to marry you, Except she's as willing as ye.' They have taken Eppie Morrie, Since better could nae be, And they're awa to Carrie side, As fast as horse could flee. When mass was sung, and bells were rung, And all were bound for bed, Then Willie an Eppie Morrie In one bed they were laid.	Haud far awa frae me, Willie, Haud far awa frae me; Before I'll lose my maidenhead, I'll try my strength with thee.' She took the cap from off her head And threw it to the way; Said, Ere I lose my maidenhead, I'll fight with you till day. Then early in the morning, Before her clothes were on, In came the maiden of Scalletter, Gown and shirt alone. Get up, get up, young woman, And drink the wine wi me;' You might have called me maiden, I'm sure as leal as thee.' Wally fa you, Willie, That ye could nae prove a man And taen the lassie's maidenhead! She would have hired your han.' Haud far awa frae me, lady, Haud far awa frae me; There's not a man in a' Strathdon The day shall wed wi me.' Soon in there came Belbordlane, With a pistol on every side: Come awa hame, Eppie Morrie, And there you'll be my bride.' Go get to me a horse, Willie, And get it like a man, And send me back to my mother A maiden as I cam. The sun shines oer the westlin hills; By the light lamp of the moon, Just saddle your horse, young John Forsyth, And whistle, and I'll come soon.'

== Recordings ==
- A list of recordings is to be found here: Child Ballad Database
