= Alfredo Welby =

Italian footballer (1910-1998)

Personal information
- Date of birth: 16 December 1910
- Place of birth: Rome, Italy
- Date of death: 14 July 1998 (aged 87)
- Place of death: Rome, Italy
- Position: Midfielder

Youth career
- 1927: Roman
- 1927–1929: AS Roma

Senior career*
Years	Team	Apps	(Gls)
1929–1930	AS Roma		
1930–1932	Reggina	14	(1)
1932–1933	Cosenza		
1937–1938	MATER		
- * Club domestic league appearances and goals

Alfredo Welby (16 December 1910 – 14 July 1998) was an Italian professional footballer who played for AS Roma, Reggina, Cosenza and MATER.

He was the father of right-to-die activist Piergiorgio Welby. He was of Scottish origin.
