= Euphemia Welby =

British public servant (1891–1987)

Euphemia Violet Welby, CBE, JP (née Lyon; 28 September 1891 – 6 May 1987) was commissioned as a superintendent in the Women's Royal Naval Service (WRNS) on 12 June 1939. She was appointed Commander of the Order of the British Empire (CBE) on 1 January 1944.

== Background ==
Parents: Admiral Herbert Lyon and Frances Violet Inglis

- 1914–1916: Hon. Sec. SS&AFA Devonport (later Hon. Sec. SS/AFA)
- 1916–1919: Red Cross Cook, Malta
- 1939–1945: WRNS service:

12 June 1939 – July 1945: Staff of Commander-in-Chief, Plymouth [HMS Drake]

In civilian life, she did social work on committees in Plymouth and became Chairman of the Astor Institute and was a Justice of the Peace in Somerset, England in 1947.

== Family ==
Euphemia Violet Lyon married Richard Martin Welby (1886–1930), a naval officer who rose to the rank of Captain, who was the son of the Rev. Abraham Adlard Welby and Bertha Sobranoa. The couple had four children.

== Death ==
Euphemia Welby died in 1987, aged 95. She is buried alongside her mother in the graveyard of All Saints' Church, Freshwater.
