= Eufemia (given name) =

Eufemia is a feminine given name, a variant spelling of Euphemia in various languages.

Notable people with the name include:

- Eufemia "Femi" Benussi (born 1945), Yugoslav-Italian film actress
- Eufemia Cullamat (born 1960), Filipina farmer, activist, and politician
- Eufemia von Adlersfeld-Ballestrem (1854–1941), German novelist and aristocrat
