= Basilica of Sant'Eufemia, Grado =

Minor basilica in north-eastern Italy

Basilica of Sant'Eufemia
- Basilica di Sant'Eufemia
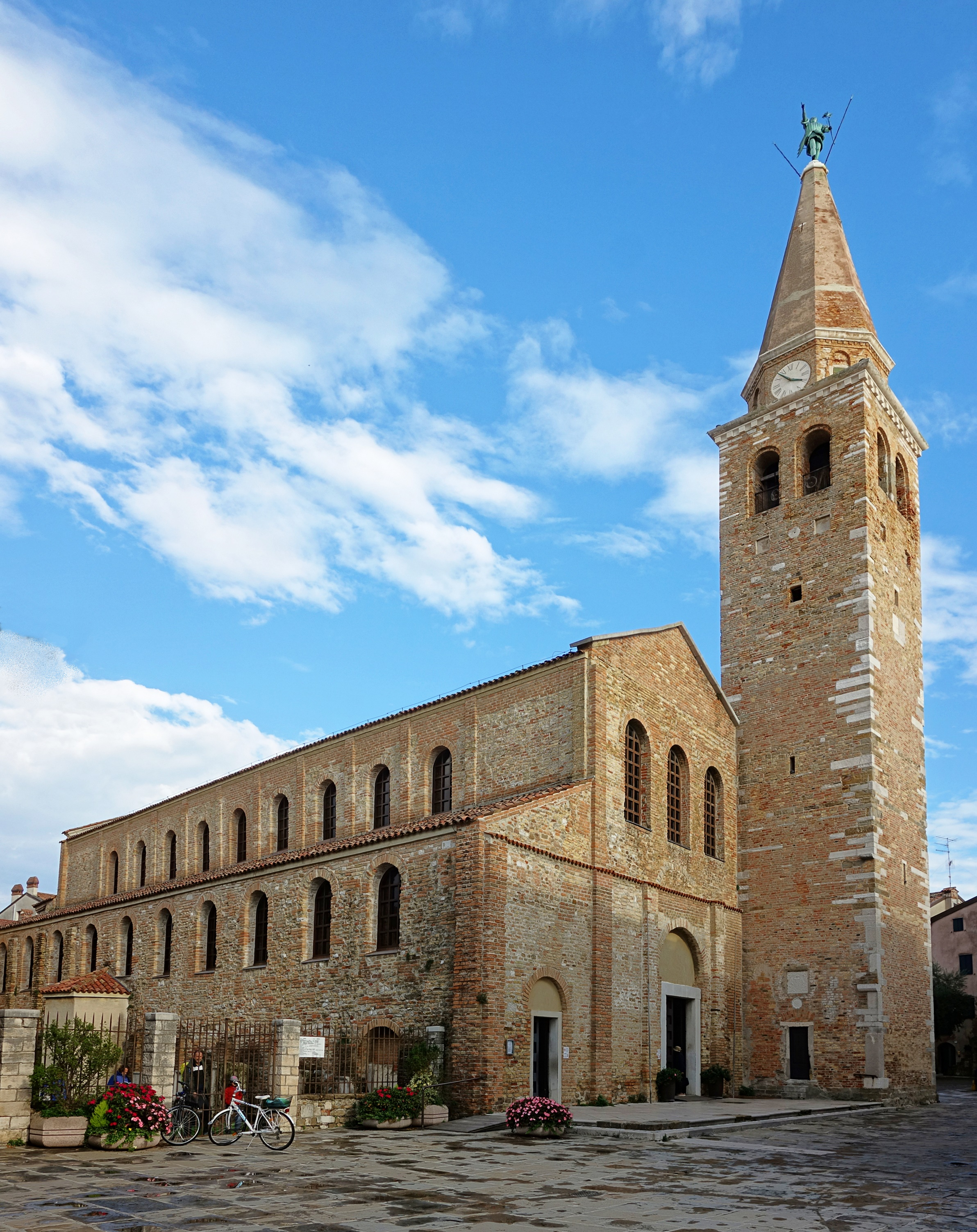
- Exterior view of the basilica and bell tower
- Basilica of Sant'Eufemia
- 45°40′35″N 13°23′07″E
- Location: Grado, Friuli-Venezia Giulia
- Country: Italy
- Denomination: Catholic Church
- Tradition: Roman

History
- Status: Minor basilica, parish church
- Founded: 4th century
- Dedication: Saint Euphemia

Architecture
- Architectural type: Church
- Style: Early Christian
- Completed: 579

Administration
- Diocese: Archdiocese of Gorizia

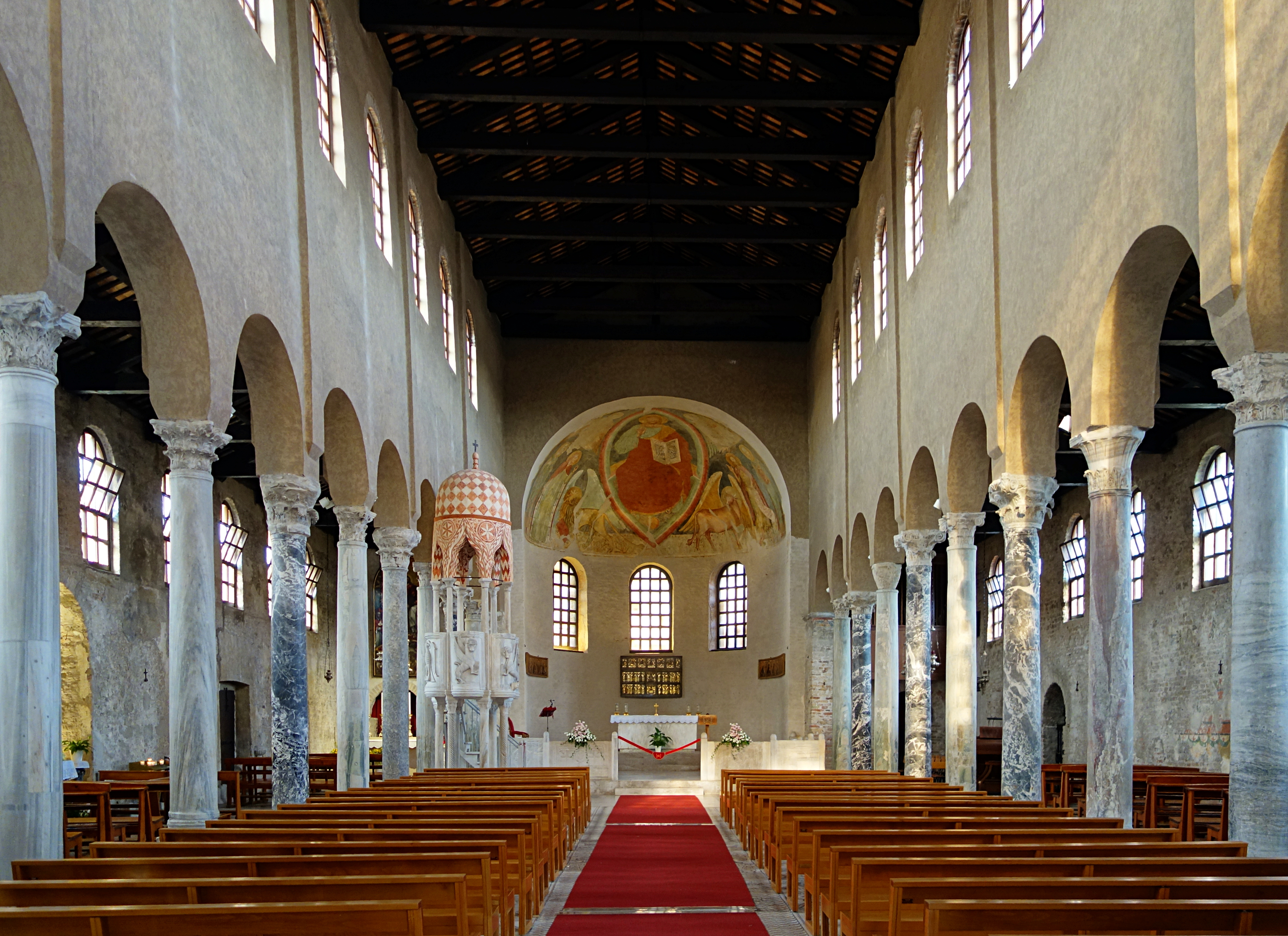
Interior

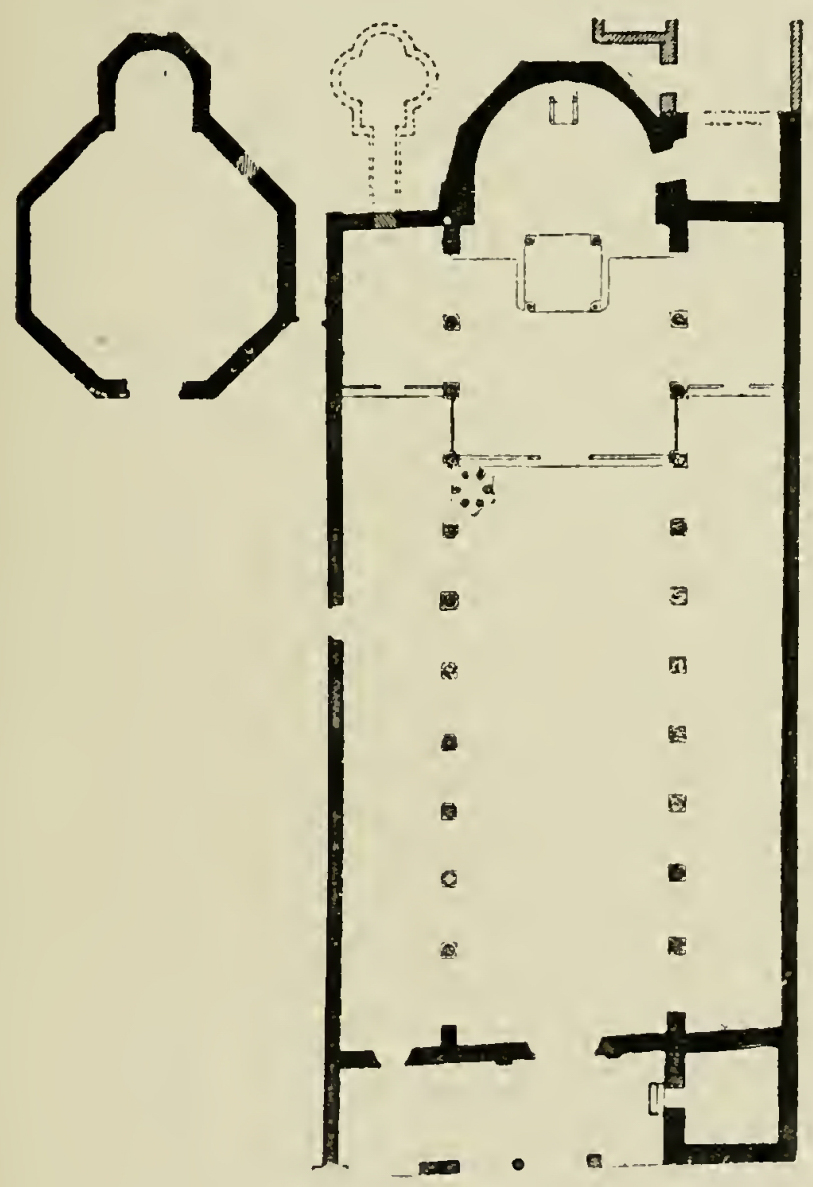
Ground plan (without the 15th ct. bell tower)

The Basilica of Sant'Eufemia (Italian: Basilica di Sant'Eufemia) is a minor basilica in Grado, Friuli Venezia Giulia, Italy, formerly a cathedral. It is dedicated to Saint Euphemia.

== History ==
The present basilica made of bricks and sandstone stands on a fourth century basilica, of which not much is known. Although some features are still visible. Traces of a former narthex can be seen under the windows of the façade pointing southwest. The church was ordered built by Elijah, Archbishop of Aquileia, after his retreat from the invasion of the Lombards in 568. In 571 Elijah proclaimed himself patriarch and dedicated the church to Saint Euphemia.

During the sixth through early seventh century the basilica was the seat of the pro-Roman and pro-Byzantine branch of the church until the formation of the Patriarchate of Grado in 606.

Due to the dissolving of the Grado patriarchate into the new Patriarchate of Venice in 1451 the church lost the title of cathedral, but shortly after in 1455 the bell tower was built, possibly to compensate for this.

Alterations to the church were made in the seventeenth and nineteenth centuries, although these were partly removed in twentieth-century restorations.

== Features ==
The brickwork of the basilica is mostly made of shells mixed with sand. The bell tower is topped with a cast copper weathervane statue of Archangel Michael, which has become a symbol of the city.

Much of the fame of the basilica comes from the incredibly well preserved sixth-century floor mosaics that decorate the basilica, as it is extremely rare to find the original floor mosaics preserved in an early Christian basilica.

Features from the fourth century basilica are visible in the nave, including a visible fragment of its floor mosaics and a Corinthian capital.

The half-dome of the apse is decorated with a thirteenth century Gothic fresco of Christ enthroned.

On the left side of the central nave stands a tall hexagonal pulpit of the last quarter of the 13th century or the beginning of the 14th century, with a canopy adorned by sculptured decorations which appeal to be Islamic. The preacher's cage itself shows the Symbols of the Four Evangelists.

Next to the basilica, at its north end, stands the octagonal baptistery of which the sixth-century floor mosaics are also preserved. It has an apse protruding to the northeast corresponding to the church's axis. In the center of the interior space the bricks of the large hexagonal dipping basin is covered by marble.

== Gallery ==
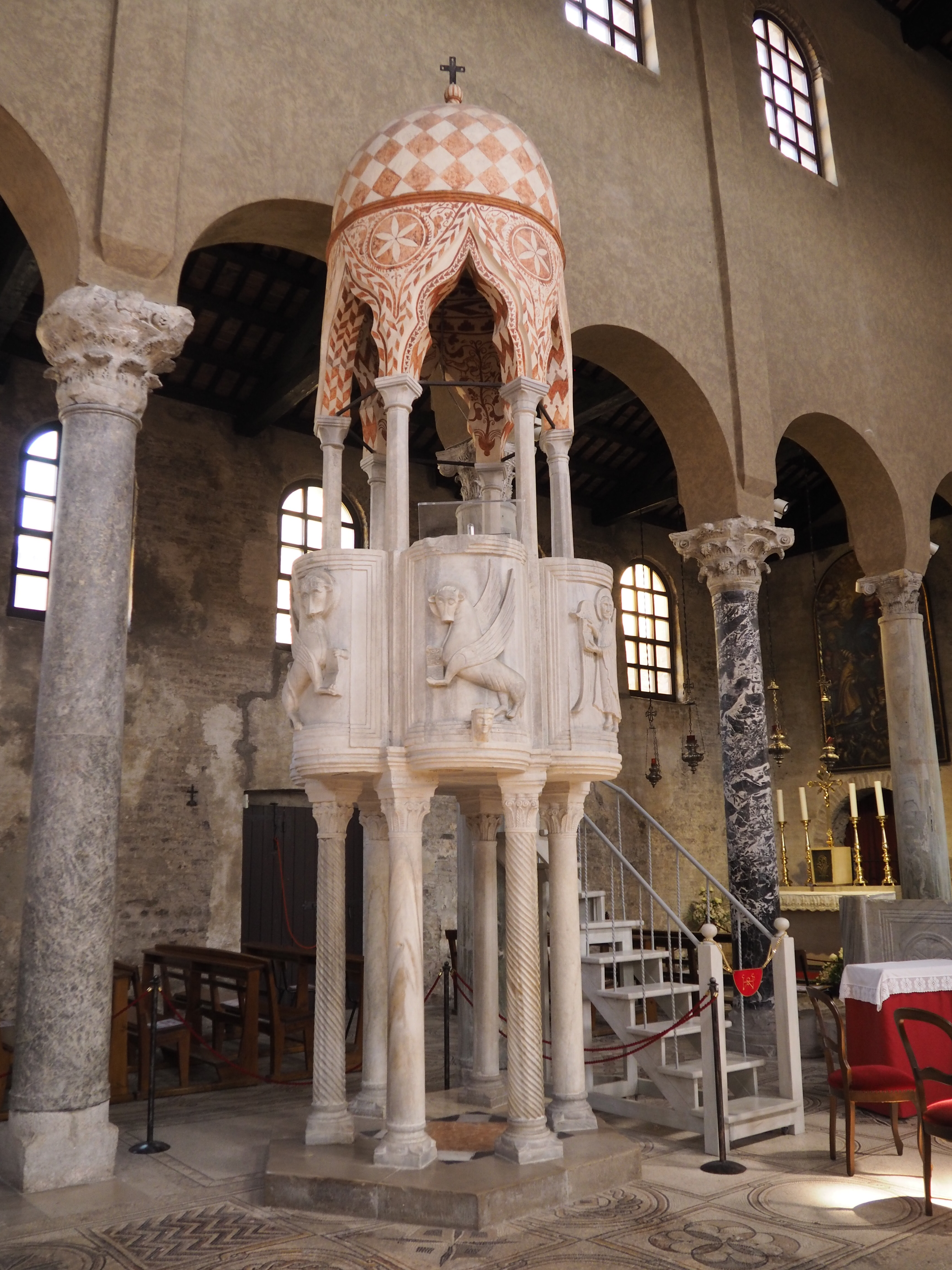
Pulpit with the Symbols of the Evangelists, ca. 1300

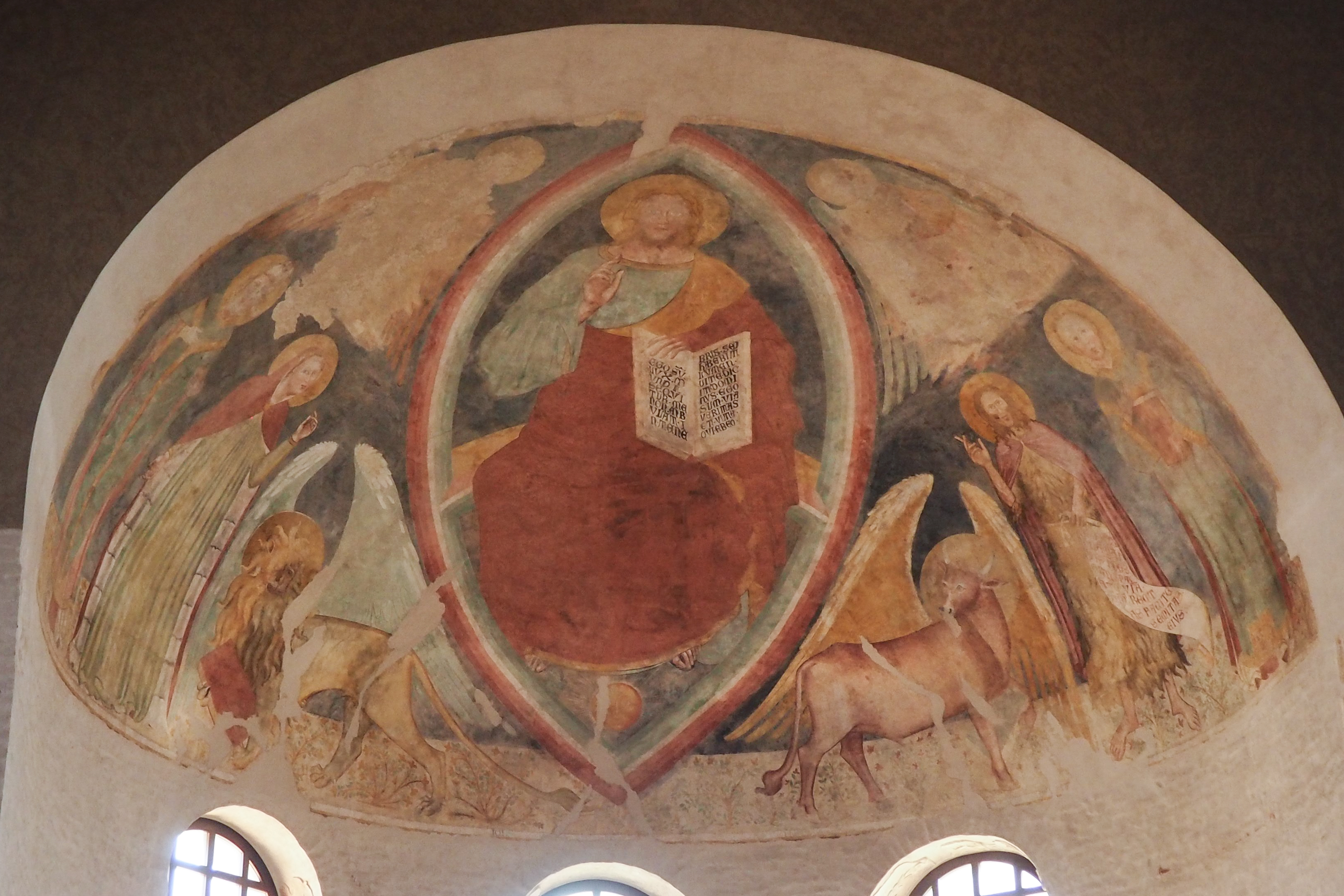
Majestas Domini, fresco of the apse, 12th/13th ct.

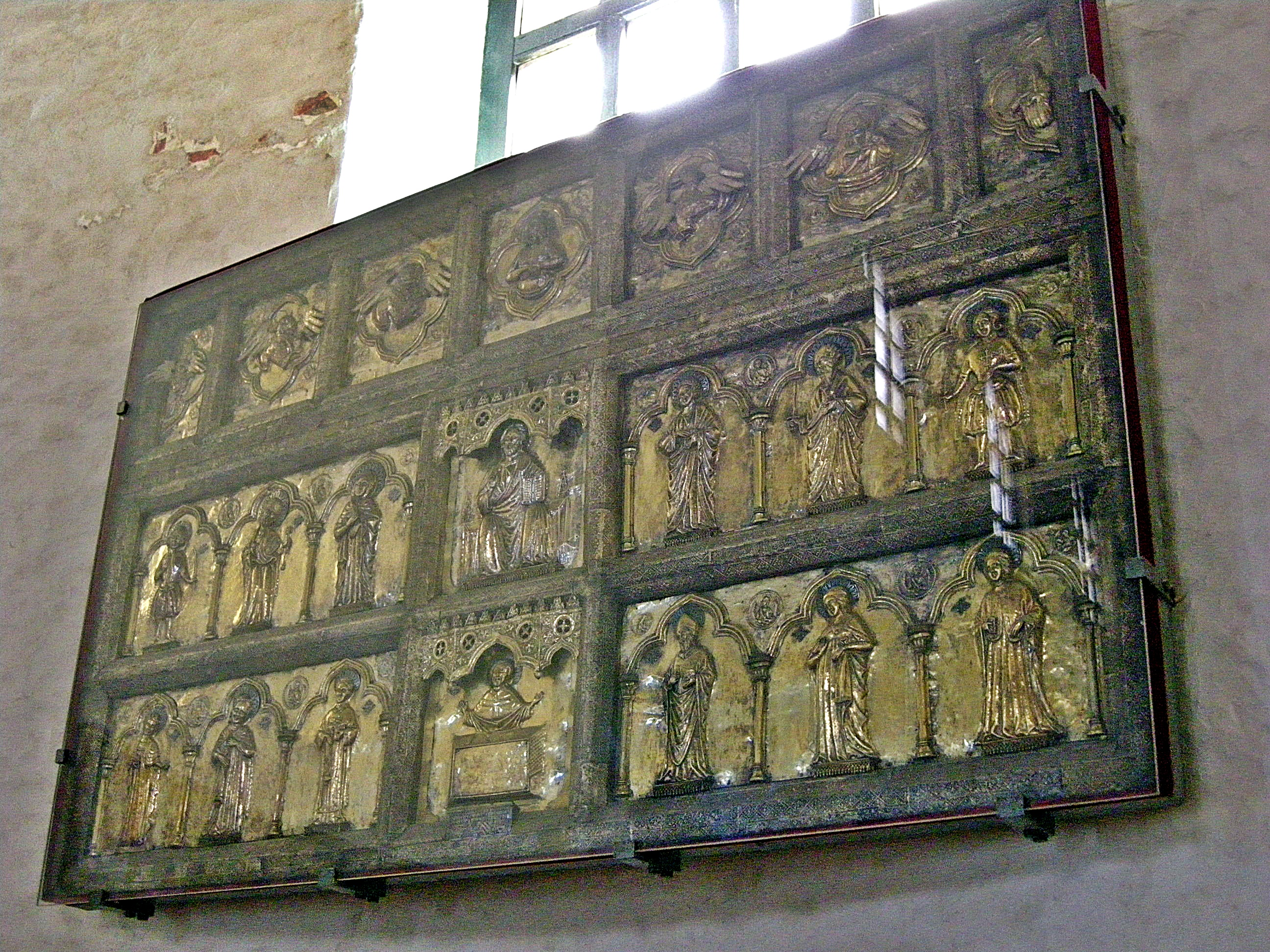
Retable in vermeil, 1372

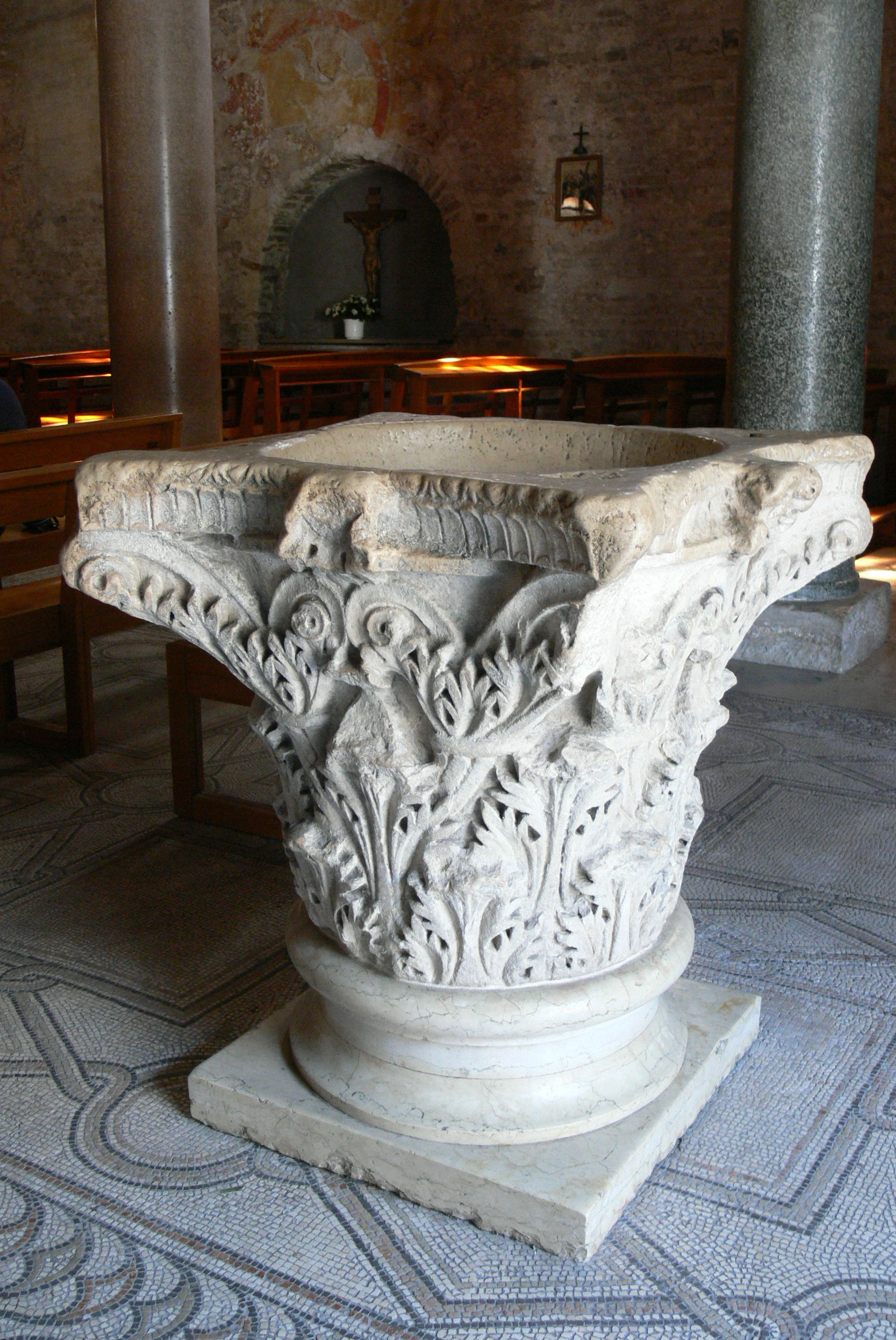
Baptismal font made of an antique capital

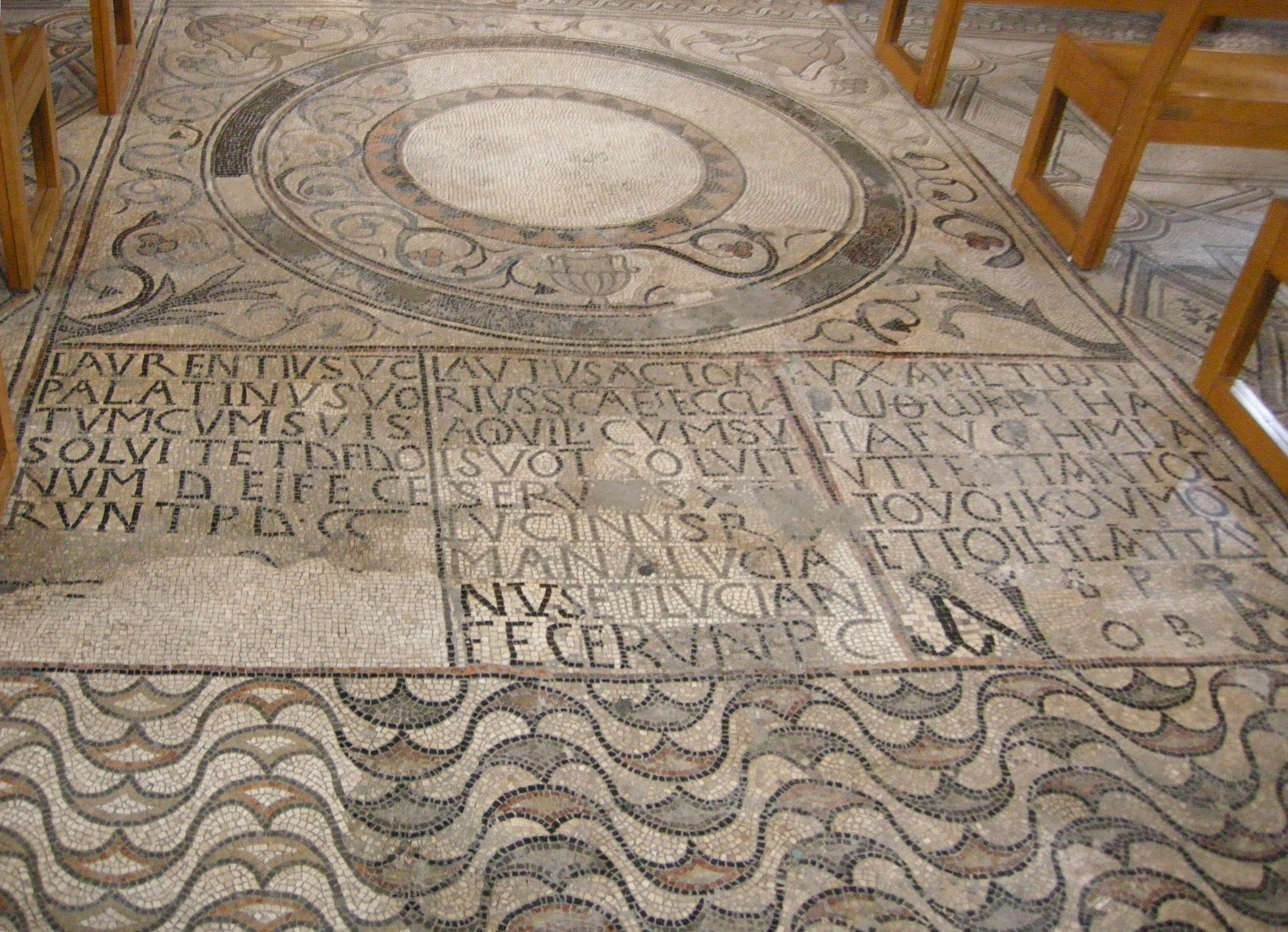
Floor mosaics of the nave, 6th ct.

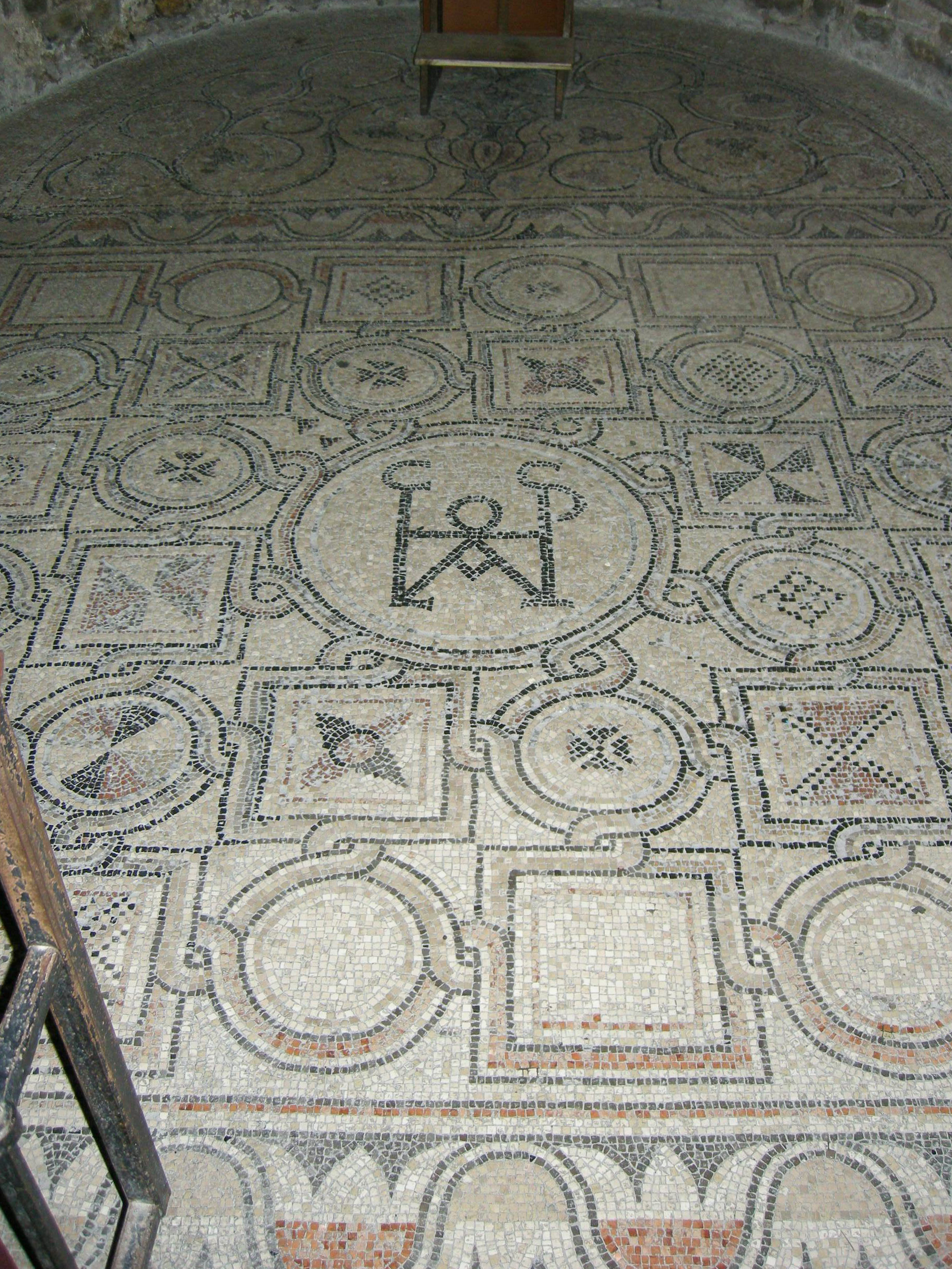
The mausoleum of bishop Elia (Helias Episcopus, 571–586), the floor mosaic bears his monogram

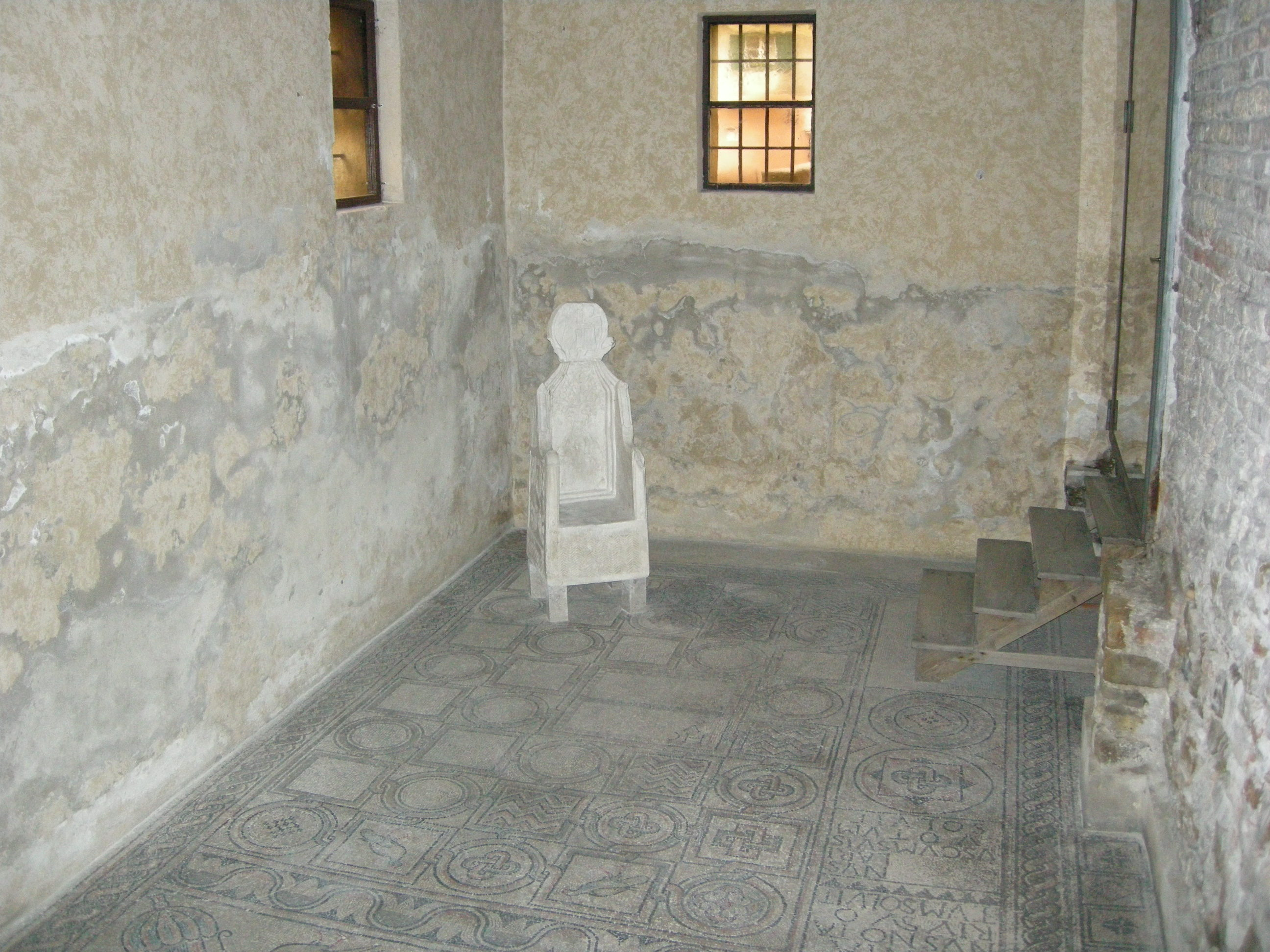
The chamber to the right of the entrance

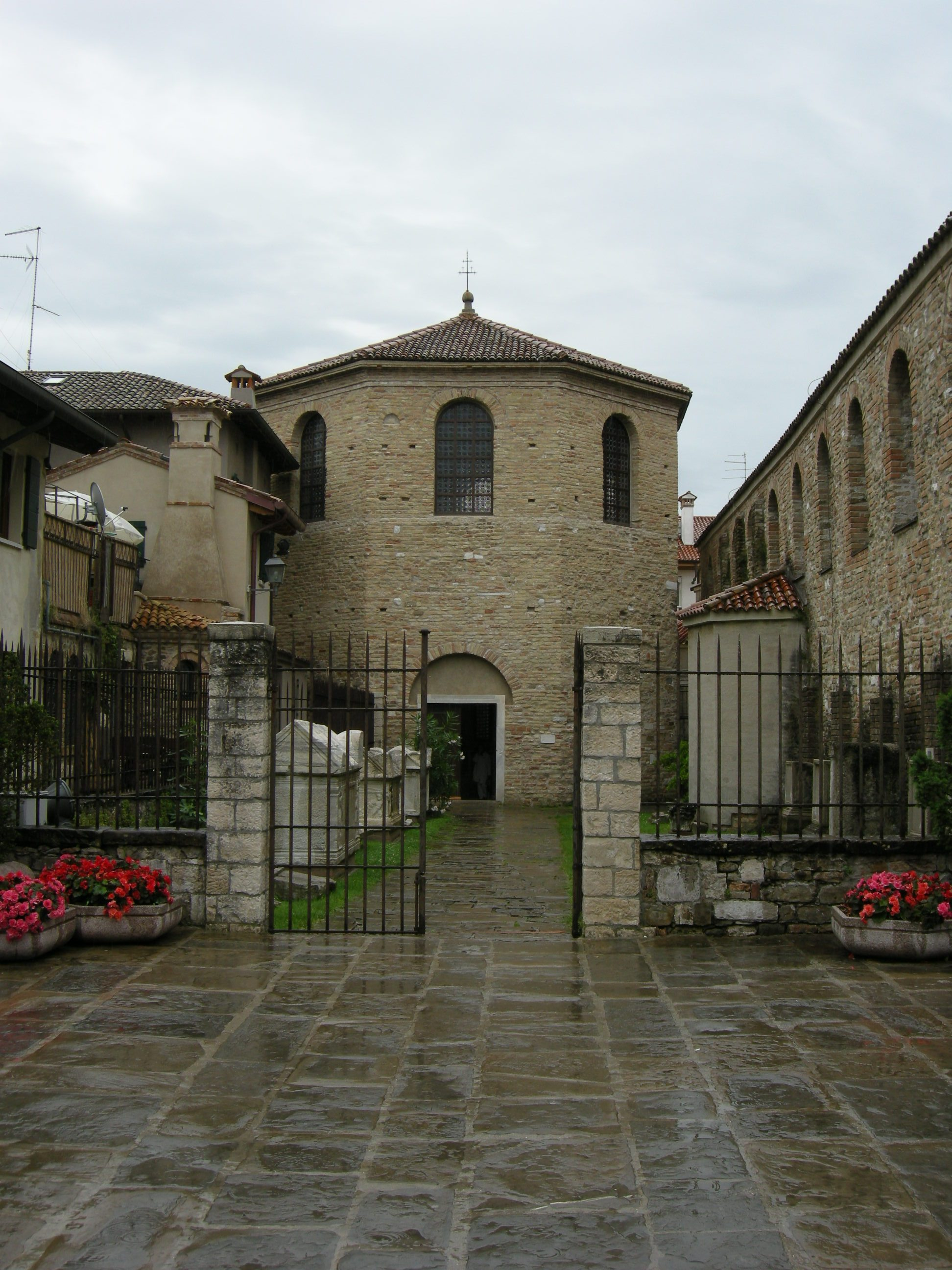
The baptistery on the north side of the church

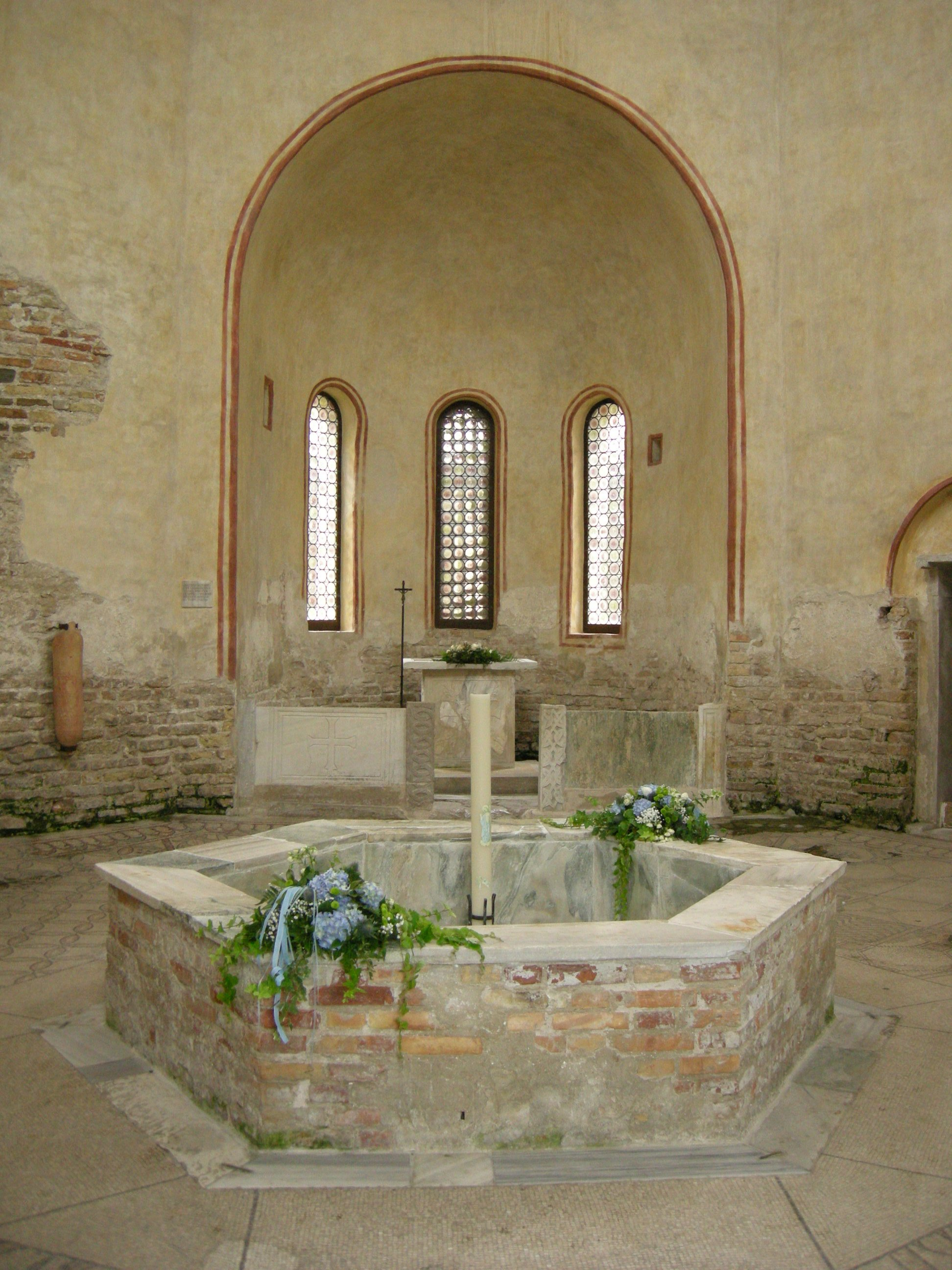
Baptistery, interior

== Sources ==
- Rentetzi, Efthalia, 2008: Un'inedita figura di pesce. Parentele stilistiche tra i mosaici pavimentali di s. Maria delle Grazie e s. Eufemia a Grado. Artonweb.it.

== Bibliography ==
- Bisconti, F., 2000: Temi di Iconografia Paleocristiana. Città del Vaticano.
- Bovini, G., 1973: Grado Paleocristiana in Archeologia Cristiana. Bologna.
- Farioli, R., 1975: Mosaici Pavimentali dell'alto Adriatico e dell'Africa settentrionale in età bizantina, in Antichità Altoadriatiche, vol. V. (paleocristiana). Ravenna.
- Farioli, R., 1975: Pavimenti musivi di Ravenna. Ravenna.
- Rentetzi, Efthalia, 2009: Un frammento inedito di S. Eufemia a Grado. Il pavimento musivo del Salutatorium, in Arte Cristiana, n. 850 (January–February) 2009, Vol. XCVII, pp. 51–52.
- Trovabene, Giordana, nd: Il salutatorium del vescovo Elia nella cattedrale di Grado: nuove considerazioni sul mosaico pavimentale, in Atti del XV colloquio dell'Associazione Italiana per lo Studio e la Conservazione del Mosaico, pp. 41–52
- Guida rossa: Friuli-Venezia Giulia. Milano: Touring Club editore, 1999, pp. 505–508, ISBN 88-365-0007-2.
