= Tierra del Pan =

Coordinates: 41.6089°N 5.6375°W

Location of the comarca in the province of Zamora.

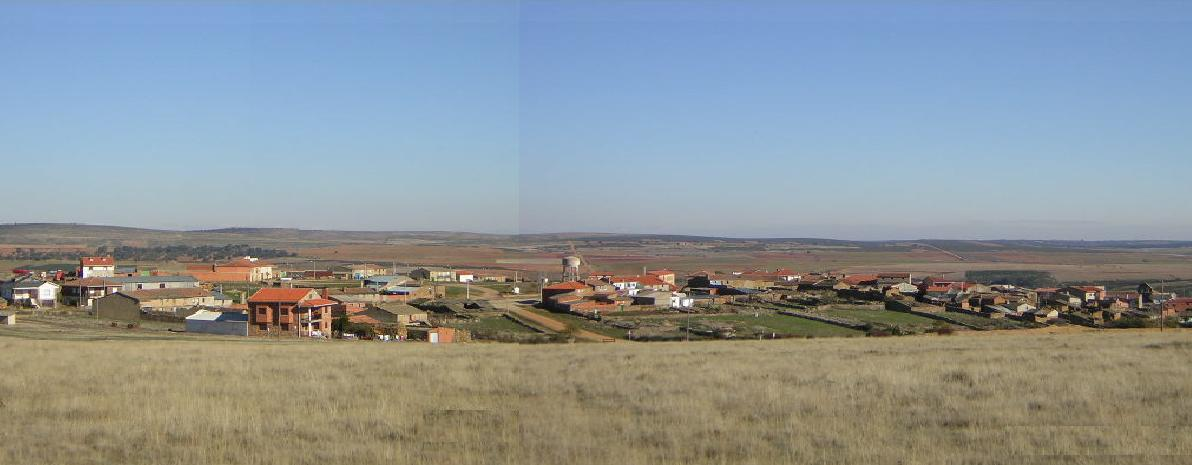
Typical landscape of Tierra del Pan in Losilla, Santa Eufemia del Barco.

Tierra del Pan (Land of Bread) is a comarca located in the center of the province of Zamora, western Spain. It belongs to the Autonomous Community of Castile and León. The city of Zamora, capital of the province, is included in this comarca.

Despite the strong identity of its inhabitants, this historical region has not been able to achieve the necessary legal recognition for its administrative development. Therefore its municipalities have resorted to organizing themselves in mancomunidad, the only legal formula that has allowed the region to manage its public municipal resources meaningfully. The comarca has a total of about 76,000 inhabitants.

The Tierra del Pan comarca has a surface of 849.59 km^{2}. Its geography is typical of the Meseta Central.

== Municipalities ==
- Algodre
- Almaraz de Duero
- Andavías
- Arquillinos
- Benegiles
- Cerecinos del Carrizal
- Coreses
- Cubillos
- La Hiniesta
- Manganeses de la Lampreana
  - Riego del Camino
- Matilla la Seca
- Molacillos
- Monfarracinos
- Montamarta
- Moreruela de los Infanzones
- Muelas del Pan
  - Cerezal de Aliste
  - Ricobayo
  - Villaflor
- Pajares de la Lampreana
- Palacios del Pan
- Piedrahita de Castro
- Roales del Pan
- San Cebrián de Castro
  - Fontanillas de Castro
- San Pedro de la Nave-Almendra
  - El Campillo
  - Valdeperdices
- Torres del Carrizal
- Valcabado
- Villaseco del Pan
- Zamora
