= Piedrahita (disambiguation) =

Piedrahita (meaning: standing stone) may refer to:

== Places ==
- Piedrahíta, a municipality in the province of Ávila, Spain
- Piedrahíta, Santoña, a village in Santoña municipality, Cantabria, Spain
- Piedrahita de Castro, a municipality in the province of Zamora, Spain
- Piedrahita de Muñó, a town in the province of Burgos, Spain
- Piedrahita Mountains, a mountain range in the province of Ávila, Spain
- site of the Battle of Atapuerca

== People ==
- Piedrahita (surname)
