= Pajares =

Pajares is a Spanish place-name and surname.

== Places ==
- Pajares de Adaja, municipality in the province of Ávila, Castile and León, Spain
- Pajares de la Laguna, municipality in the province of Salamanca, Castile and León, Spain
- Pajares de la Lampreana, municipality in the province of Zamora, Castile and León, Spain
- Pajares de los Oteros, municipality in the province of León, Castile and León, Spain
- Pajares Base Tunnel, railway tunnel in Spain, on the AVE line from Valladolid to Gijón
- Pajares, parish of Lena, municipality in Spain

== Surname ==
- María Felipe y Pajares (1848–1913) Spanish teacher and author
- Andrés Pajares (born 1940), Spanish actor
- Jacobo María Ynclán Pajares, or Jacobo Ynclán (born 1984), Spanish footballer
