= María Felipe y Pajares =

María Felipe y Pajares (1848–1913) was a late nineteenth-century Spanish teacher and educator. She was born in Trijueque, Guadalajara, Spain on 21 May 1848 and died in San Sebastián, Guipúzcoa, Spain on August 5, 1913.

== Career ==
María Felipe y Pajares was born the second of four sisters into a family of landed gentry in the province of Guadalajara. She studied at the Escuela Normal Superior in Guadalajara. She completed the first level of the elementary school teacher programme in 1867 and the superior level in 1868. In 1873, after working as a teacher in Ledanca and Marchamalo, she got the number one position in the primary school teachers competitions offered by the Casa Galera of Alcalá de Henares (Madrid), a women's correctional center.

Here, she served for thirteen years, stopping when the management of the establishment was taken over by the Sisters of Charity. While she was there, she also participated in the creation of the Sunday School, where she was a volunteer teacher. Later she taught at Manzanares Elementary School in Ciudad Real in 1898 and was appointed teacher at Peña Florida School of San Sebastián (Guipúzcoa), where she continued her educational work until her death.

== Work ==
María Felipe y Pajares was involved in the educational reform movements that swept Spain in the late nineteenth century. She was a lecturer, educator and member of the Royal Association of Sunday Schools. Over her career, she was awarded two Votes of Thanks (Votos de Gracia) from the City Council of San Sebastian and another from the Guipúzcoa Provincial Board of First Education, in gratitude for her work in teaching.

She also published several books. The Koldo Mitxelena Kulturunea representative of the County Council of Gipuzkoa acquired a copy of "Ways to preserve discipline in a school without corporal punishment", published in 1898, which corresponds to the dissertation Pajares presented in the Educational Conference cycle of that year in San Sebastian.
