= Roales =

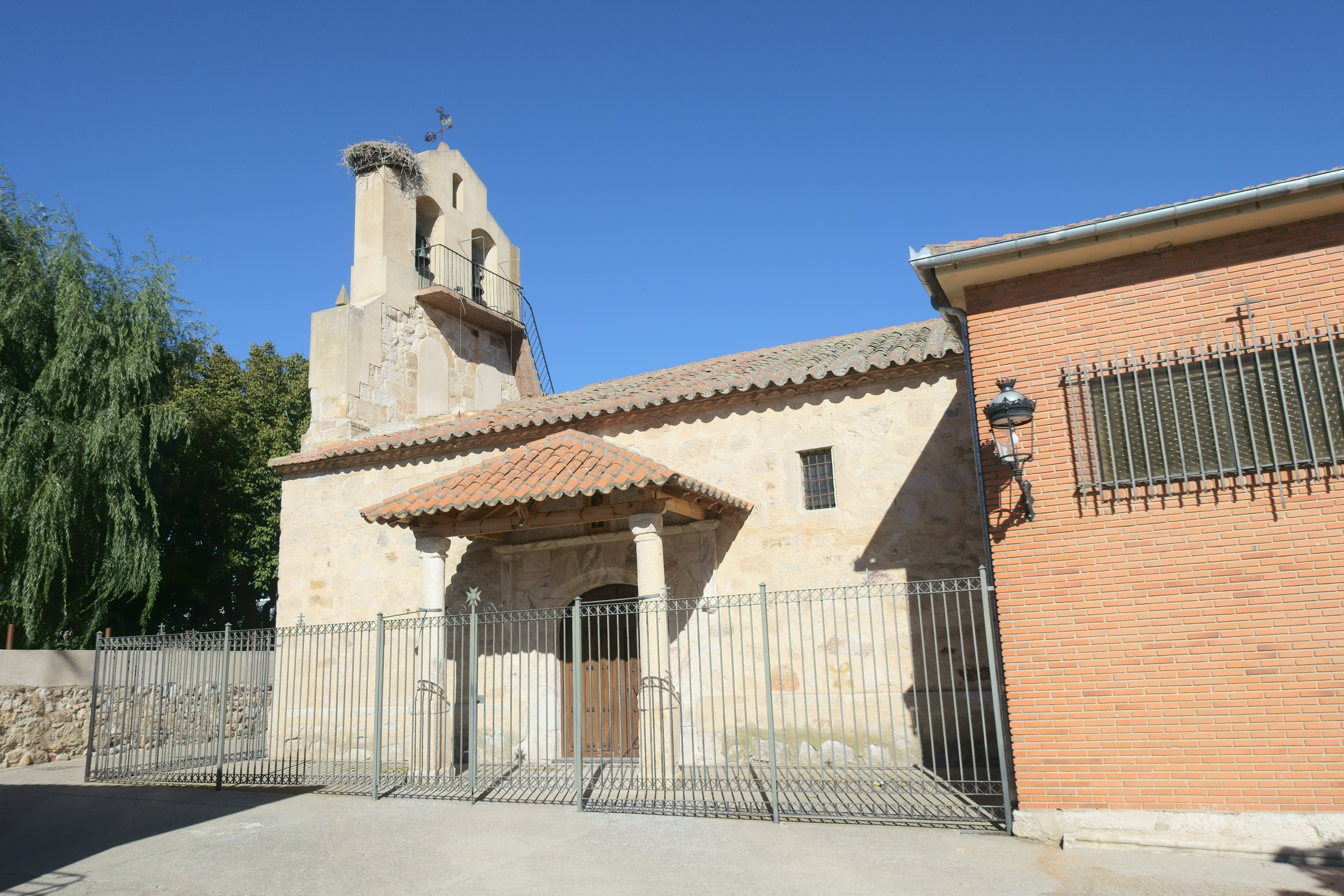

- Location in Spain
- Coordinates: 41°33′06″N 5°46′23″W
- Country: Spain
- Autonomous community: Castile and León
- Province: Zamora
- Municipality: Roales

Area
  - Total: 10 km^{2} (3.9 sq mi)

Population (2025-01-01)
  - Total: 1,019
  - Density: 100/km^{2} (260/sq mi)
- Time zone: UTC+1 (CET)
  - Summer (DST): UTC+2 (CEST)
- Climate: BSk
- Website: Official website

Roales or Roales del Pan is a municipality located in the Tierra del Pan comarca, province of Zamora, Castile and León, Spain. According to the 2004 census (INE), the municipality has a population of 501 inhabitants.

== See also ==
- Tierra del Pan
