= Villaseco del Pan =

Place in Castile and León, Spain

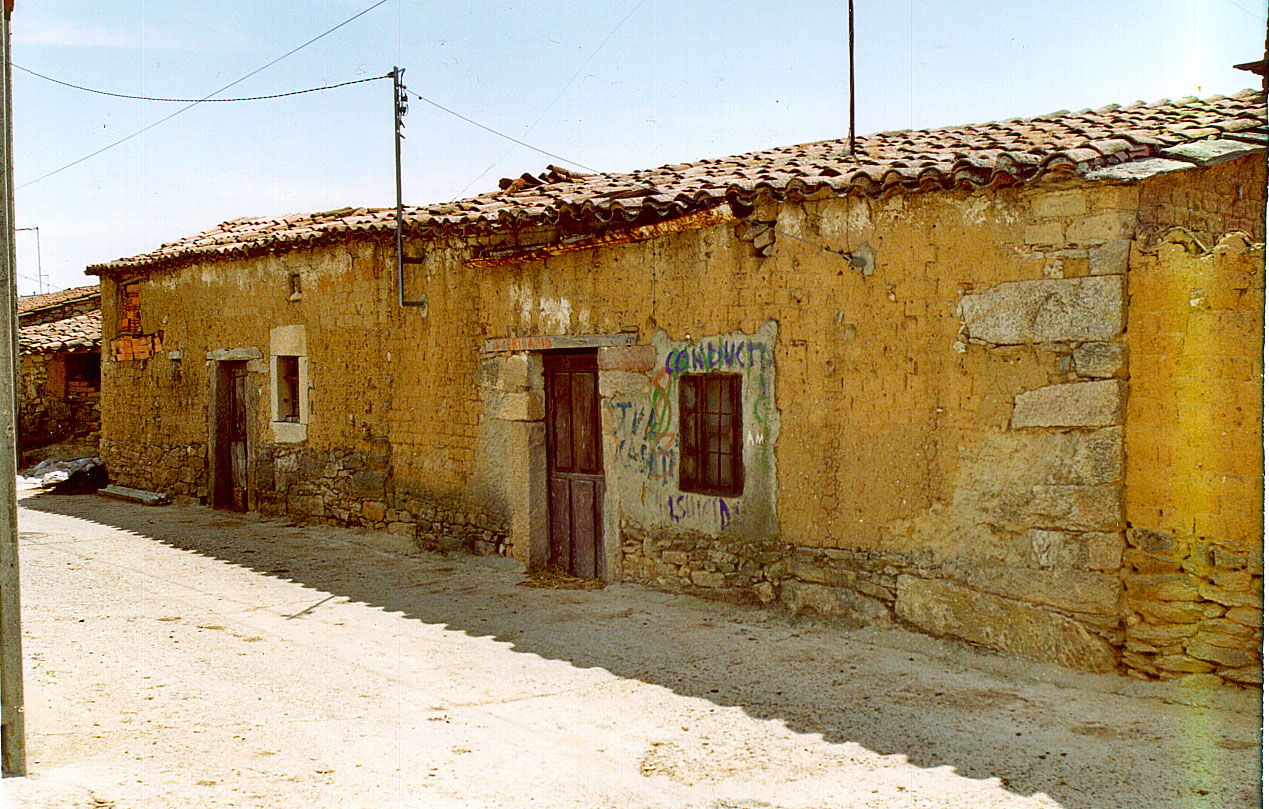

- Location in Spain
- Country: Spain
- Autonomous community: Castile and León
- Province: Zamora
- Municipality: Villaseco del Pan

Area
  - Total: 34 km^{2} (13 sq mi)

Population (2025-01-01)
  - Total: 201
  - Density: 5.9/km^{2} (15/sq mi)
- Time zone: UTC+1 (CET)
  - Summer (DST): UTC+2 (CEST)
- Climate: Csb

Villaseco del Pan is a municipality located in the province of Zamora, Castile and León, Spain. According to the 2004 census (INE), the municipality has a population of 276 inhabitants.

== See also ==
- Tierra del Pan
