= Almaraz de Duero =

- Municipality
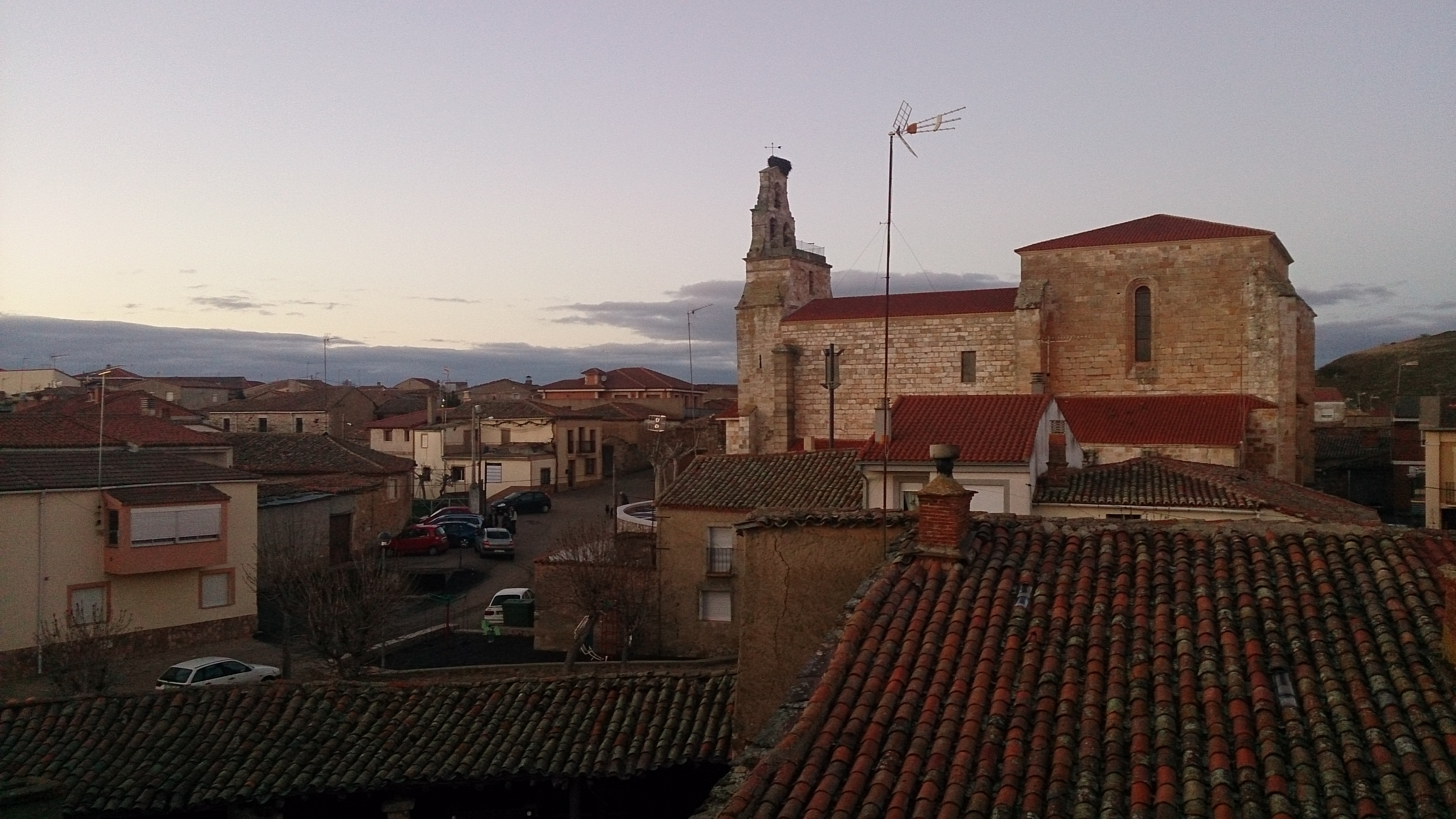

- Flag Coat of arms

- Location in Spain
- Coordinates: 41°28′N 5°55′W
- Country: Spain
- Autonomous community: Castile and León
- Province: Zamora
- Comarca: Tierra del Pan

Government
  - Alcalde: José Martín Pérez (2007) (PSOE)

Area
  - Total: 45.61 km^{2} (17.61 sq mi)
- Elevation: 710 m (2,330 ft)

Population (2025-01-01)
  - Total: 386
  - Density: 8.46/km^{2} (21.9/sq mi)
- Demonym: Almaraceño/a
- Time zone: UTC+1 (CET)
  - Summer (DST): UTC+2 (CEST)
- Postal code: 49180
- Dialing code: 980
- Climate: Csb
- Website: www.almarazdeduero.es

Almaraz de Duero is a municipality located in the province of Zamora, Castile and León, Spain. According to the 2007 census (INE), the municipality has a population of 435 inhabitants.
