= Monfarracinos =

Coordinates: 41°33′N 5°42′W

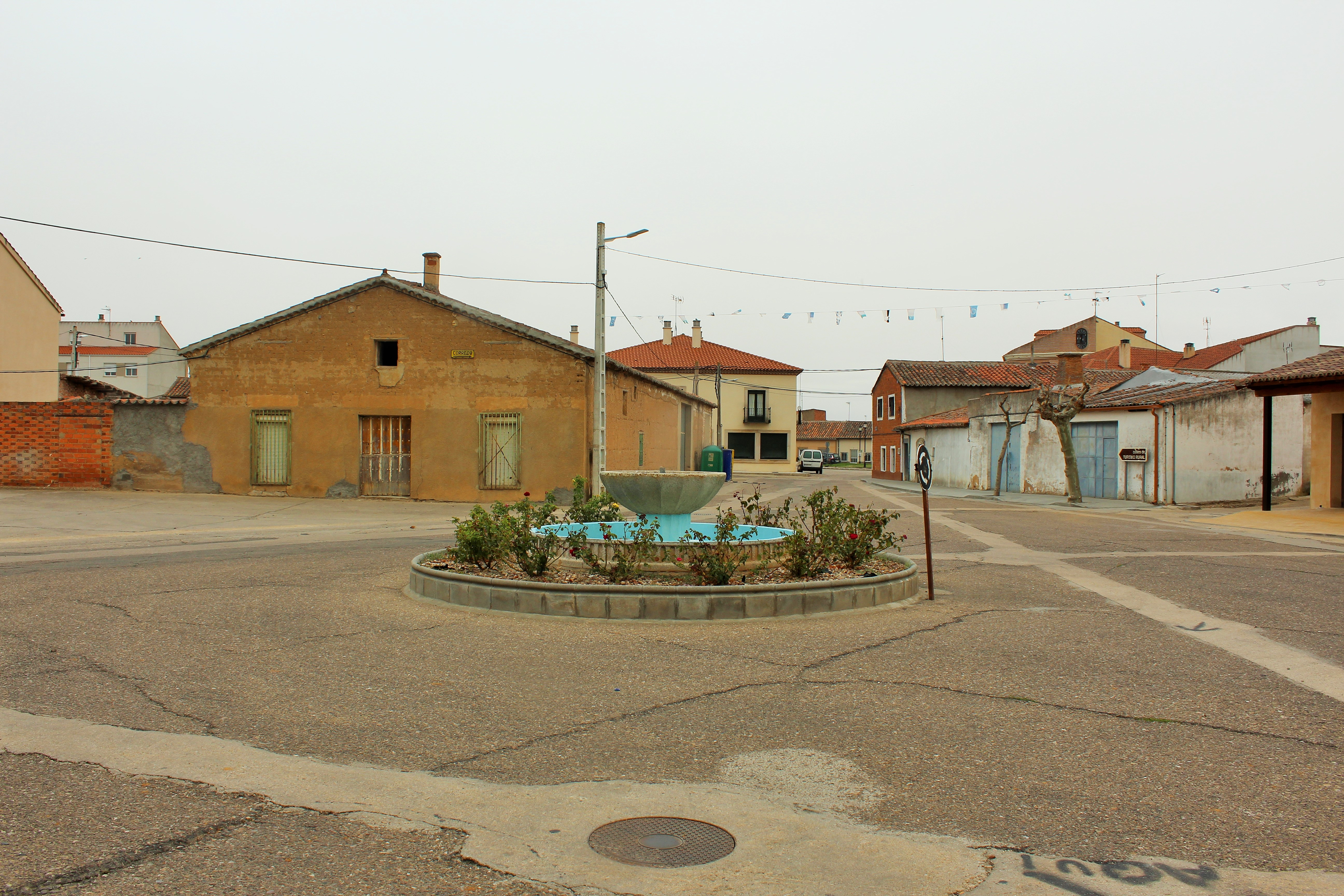

- Flag Coat of arms

- Location in Spain.
- Country: Spain
- Autonomous community: Castile and León
- Province: Zamora
- Municipality: Monfarracinos

Government
  - Mayor: Manuel Martín Pérez

Area
  - Total: 22.02 km^{2} (8.50 sq mi)

Population (2025-01-01)
  - Total: 998
  - Density: 45.3/km^{2} (117/sq mi)
- Time zone: UTC+1 (CET)
  - Summer (DST): UTC+2 (CEST)

Monfarracinos is a municipality in Zamora, a province in the autonomous community of Castile-Leon, Spain. It is located 5 km. north of the capital in the direction of Villalpando.
