= Ledanca =

Ledanca, Spain
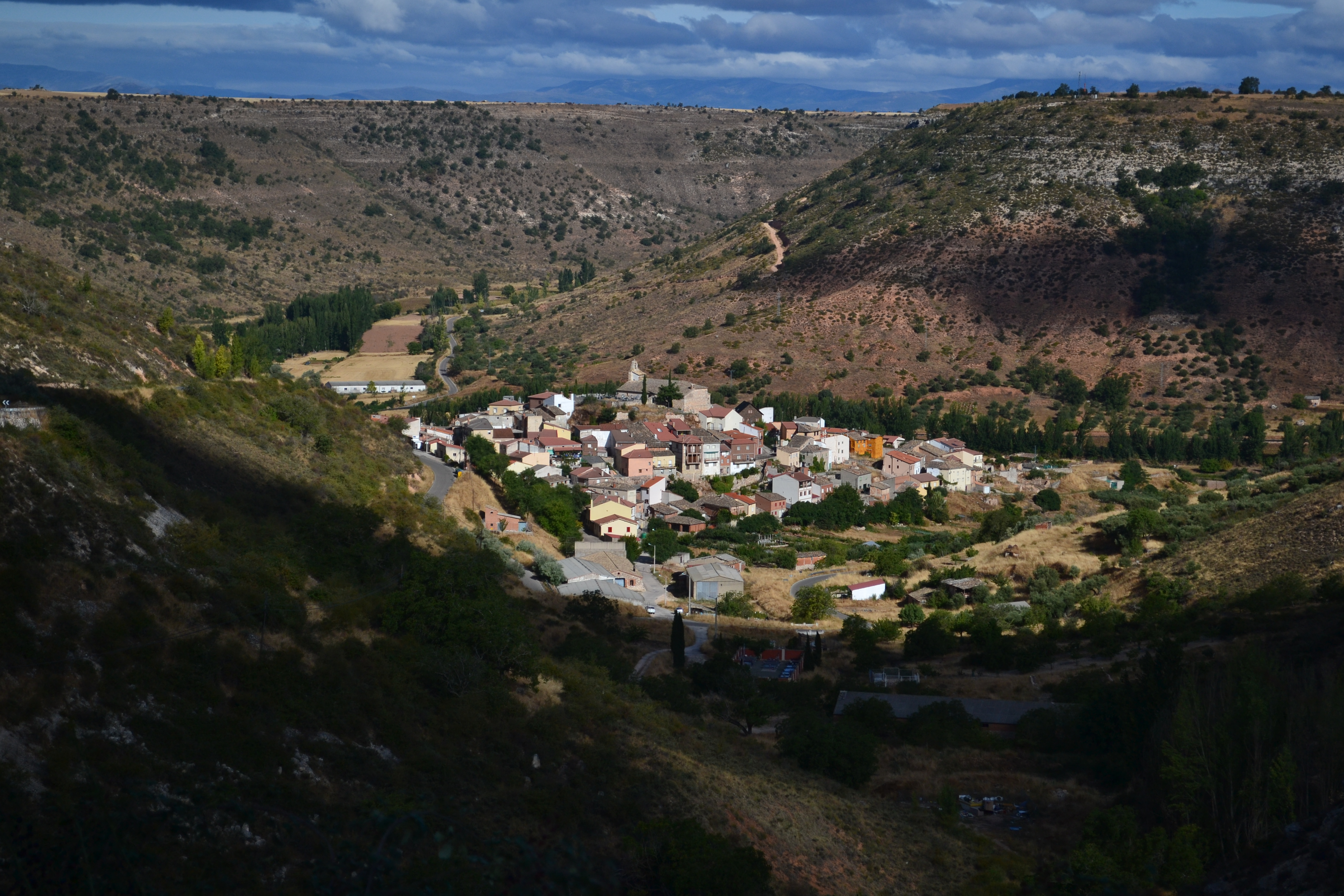

- Flag Coat of arms

- Location within Province of Guadalajara Location within Castilla-La Mancha Location within Spain
- Coordinates: 40°52′11″N 2°50′33″W
- Country: Spain
- Autonomous community: Castile-La Mancha
- Province: Guadalajara
- Municipality: Ledanca

Area
  - Total: 47 km^{2} (18 sq mi)

Population (2025-01-01)
  - Total: 98
  - Density: 2.1/km^{2} (5.4/sq mi)
- Time zone: UTC+1 (CET)
  - Summer (DST): UTC+2 (CEST)

Ledanca is a municipality located in the province of Guadalajara, Castile-La Mancha, Spain. According to the 2004 census (INE), the municipality has a population of 120 inhabitants.
