= Moreruela de los Infanzones =

Place in Castile and León, Spain

Coordinates: 41°38′N 5°42′W

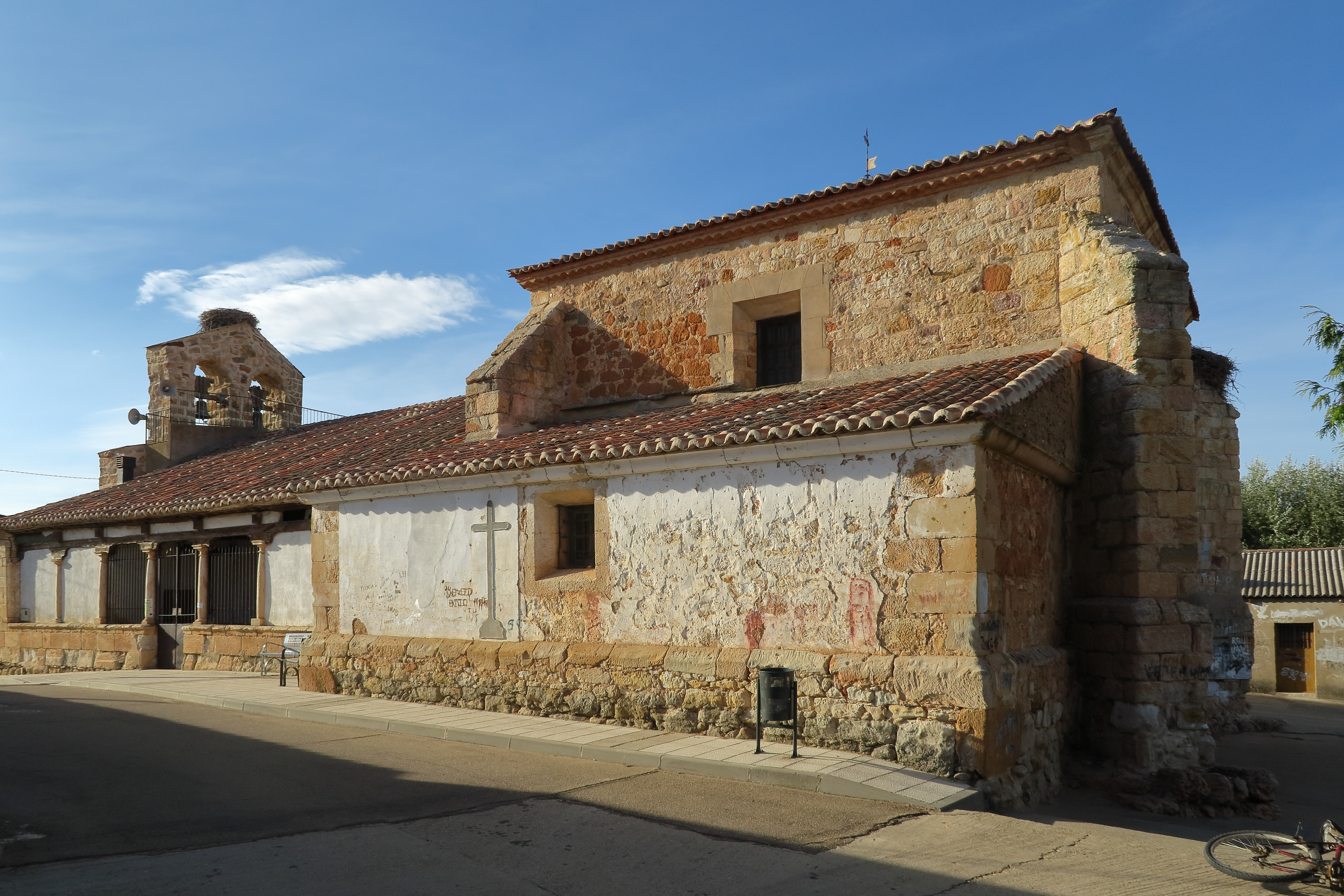

- Flag Coat of arms
- Interactive map of Moreruela de los Infanzones
- Country: Spain
- Autonomous community: Castile and León
- Province: Zamora
- Municipality: Moreruela de los Infanzones

Area
  - Total: 31.26 km^{2} (12.07 sq mi)
- Elevation: 668 m (2,192 ft)

Population (2025-01-01)
  - Total: 318
  - Density: 10.2/km^{2} (26.3/sq mi)
- Time zone: UTC+1 (CET)
  - Summer (DST): UTC+2 (CEST)
- Climate: BSk

Moreruela de los Infanzones is a municipality located in the province of Zamora, Castile and León, Spain. According to the 2004 census (INE), the municipality had a population of 429 inhabitants.
