= Manganeses de la Lampreana =

Coordinates: 41°45′N 5°42′W

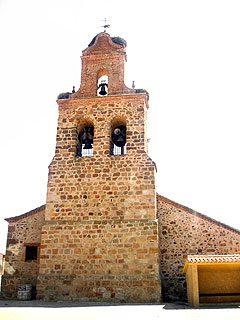

- Coat of arms
- Interactive map of Manganeses de la Lampreana
- Country: Spain
- Autonomous community: Castile and León
- Province: Zamora
- Municipality: Manganeses de la Lampreana

Area
  - Total: 59 km^{2} (23 sq mi)

Population (2025-01-01)
  - Total: 438
  - Density: 7.4/km^{2} (19/sq mi)
- Time zone: UTC+1 (CET)
  - Summer (DST): UTC+2 (CEST)
- Climate: Csb

Manganeses de la Lampreana (Spanish pronunciation: [maŋɡaˈneses ðe la lampɾeˈana]) is a municipality located in the province of Zamora, Castile and León, Spain. According to the 2004 census (INE), the municipality has a population of 696 inhabitants. The castle is approximately 6000 square feet in area and is home to the oldest known bell in Spain.

== See also ==
- Tierra de Campos
