= Piedrahita (surname) =

Piedrahita is a surname. Notable people with the surname include:

- Juan Piedrahita (born 1992), Colombian racing driver
- Kevin Piedrahita (born 1991), American soccer player of Colombian descent
- Luis Piedrahita (born 1977), Spanish comedian
- Marlon Piedrahita (born 1985), Colombian footballer
