= Piedrahita de Muñó =

Spanish town

Coordinates: 42°04′N 3°18′W

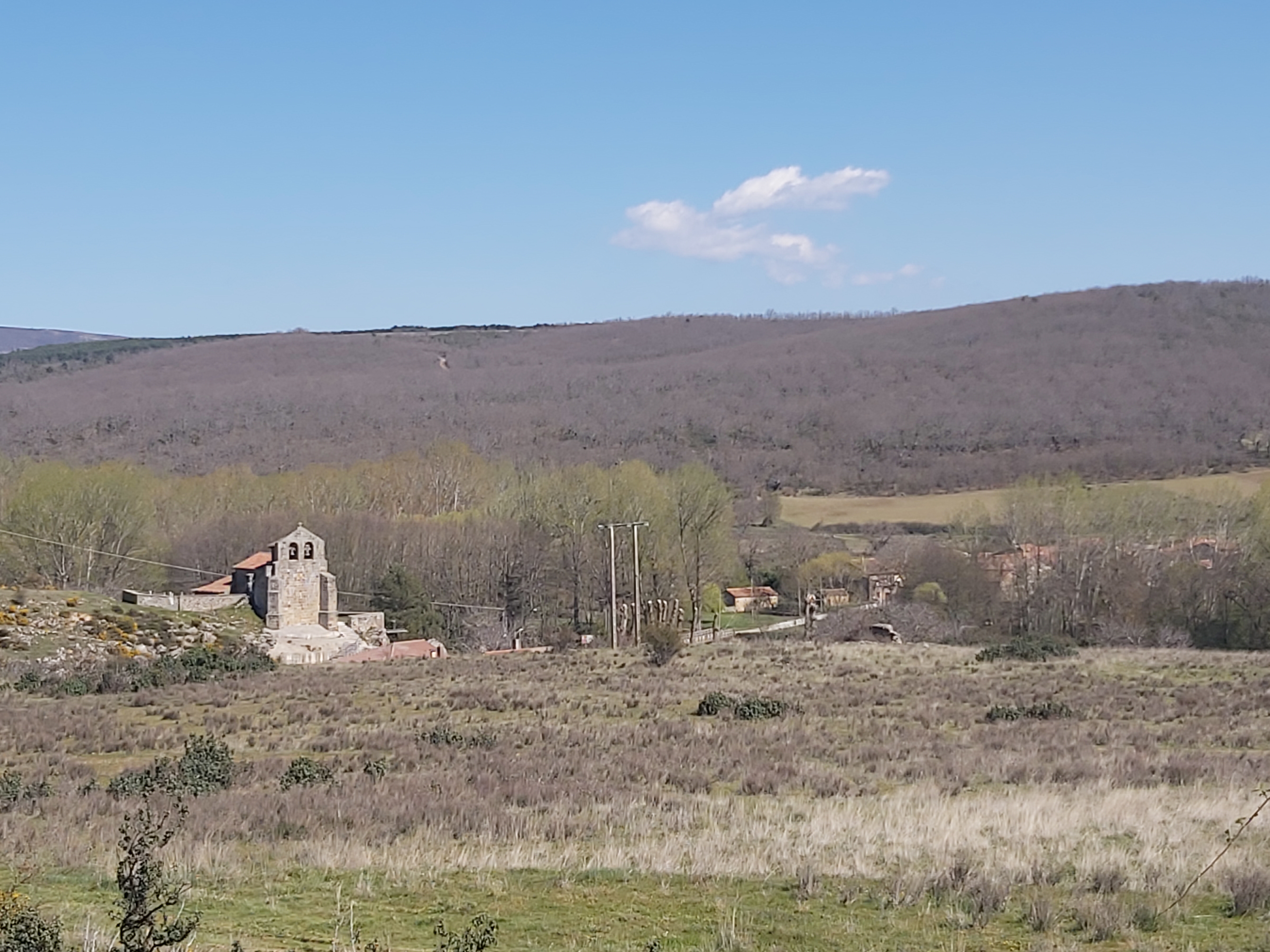
Piedrahita de Muñó with a church in the foreground

Piedrahita de Muñó is a Spanish town in the province of Burgos, Old Castile; an autonomous community of Castilla y León in the region of Sierra de la Demanda, judicial district of Salas.

== Sources ==
- Larruga, Eugenio. Memorias Políticas y Económicas.... 1794, v. 30, p. 159
- Arzobispado de Burgos Información beatos 2007
- Los Mártires Beatificados y Canonizados por el Papa Juan Pablo II. Una Reflexión Española
