= Arquillinos =

Place in Castile and León, Spain

Coordinates: 41°43′N 5°39′W

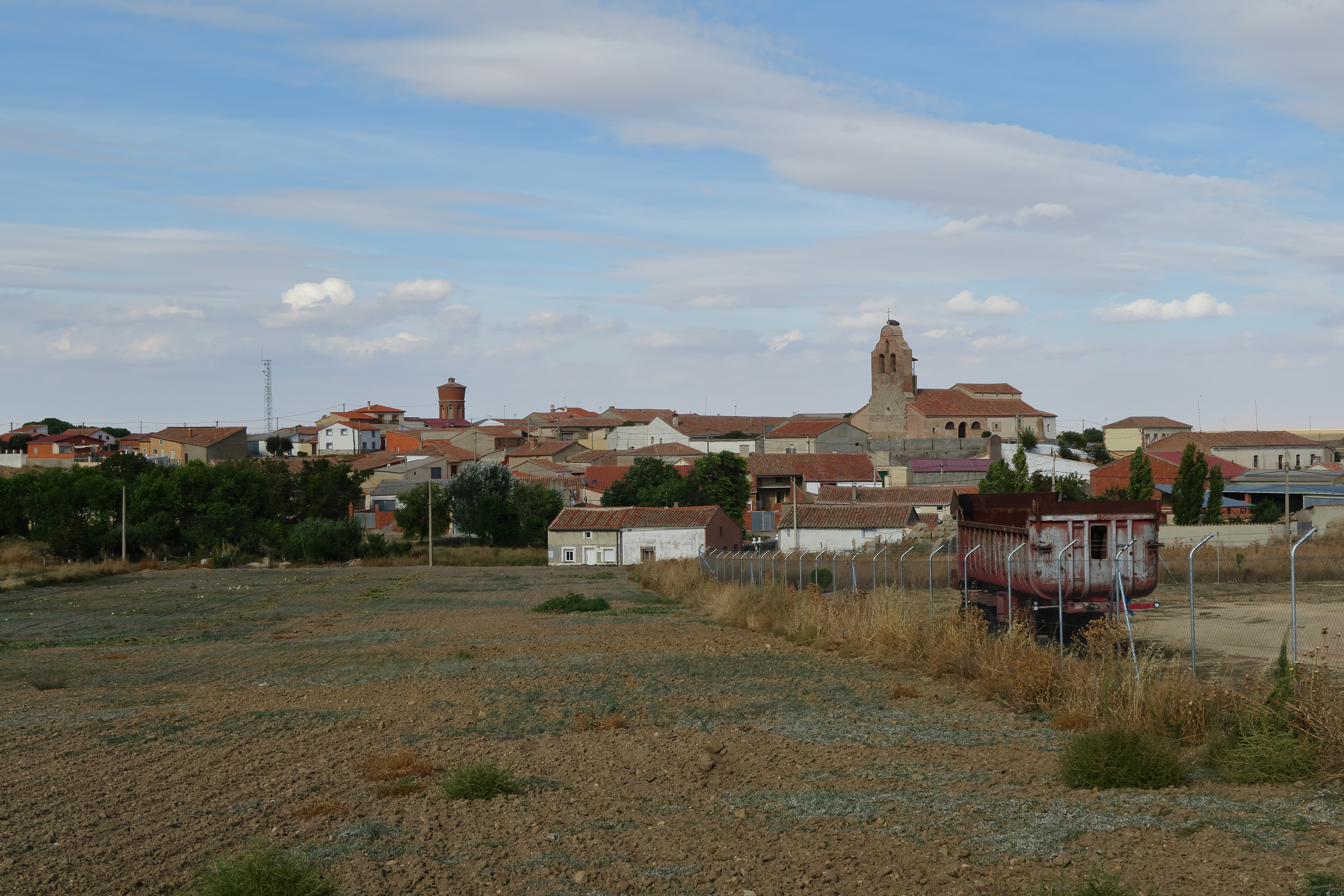

- Flag Coat of arms
- Interactive map of Arquillinos
- Country: Spain
- Autonomous community: Castile and León
- Province: Zamora
- Municipality: Arquillinos

Area
  - Total: 17 km^{2} (6.6 sq mi)

Population (2025-01-01)
  - Total: 105
  - Density: 6.2/km^{2} (16/sq mi)
- Time zone: UTC+1 (CET)
  - Summer (DST): UTC+2 (CEST)
- Climate: BSk

Arquillinos is a municipality located in the province of Zamora, Castile and León, Spain. According to the 2004 census (INE), the municipality has a population of 161 inhabitants.
