= Benegiles =

Place in Castile and León, Spain

Coordinates: 41°38′N 5°38′W

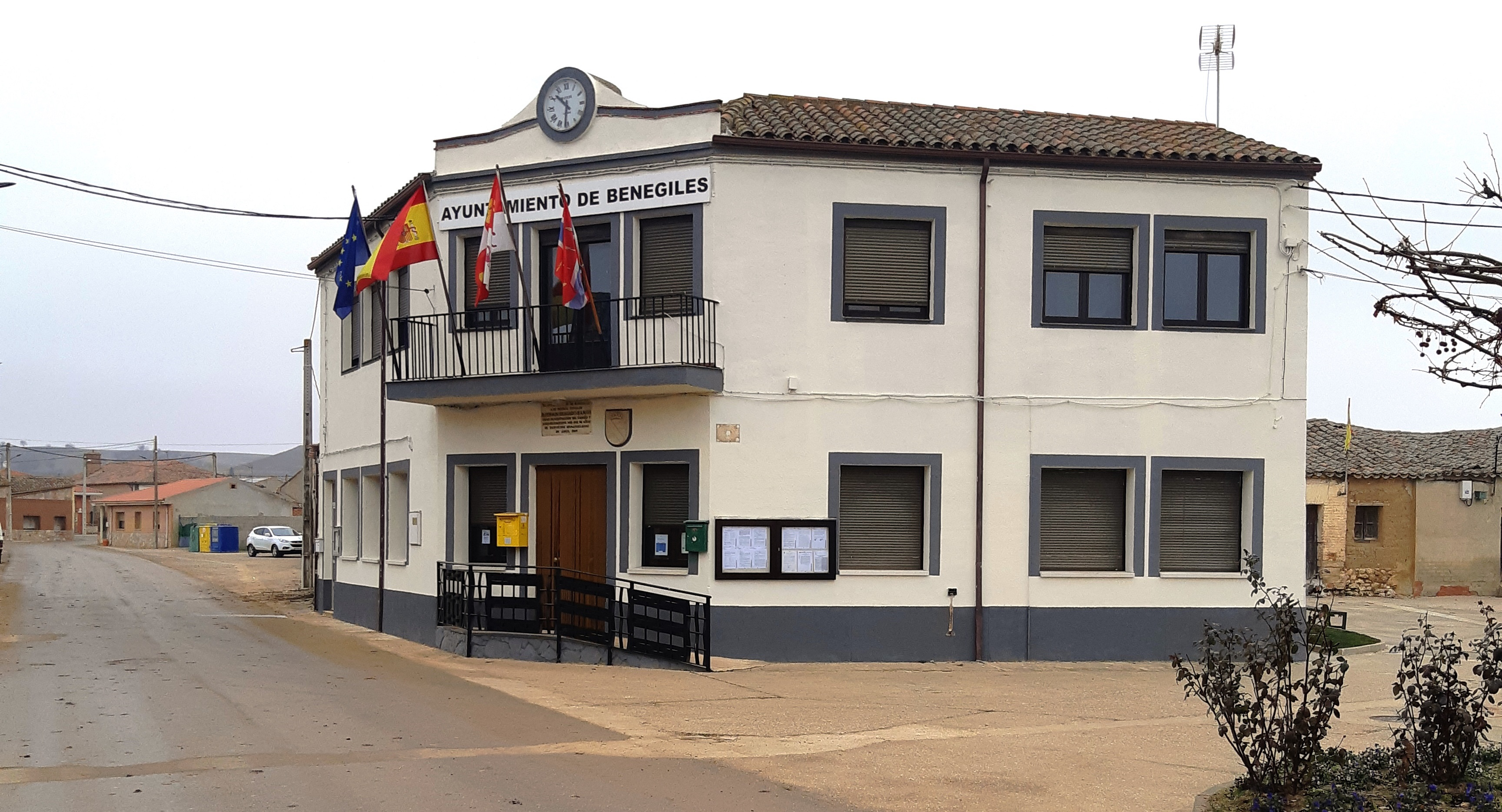
- City Hall

- Flag Coat of arms
- Interactive map of Benegiles
- Country: Spain
- Autonomous community: Castile and León
- Province: Zamora
- Municipality: Benegiles

Area
  - Total: 23 km^{2} (8.9 sq mi)

Population (2025-01-01)
  - Total: 266
  - Density: 12/km^{2} (30/sq mi)
- Time zone: UTC+1 (CET)
  - Summer (DST): UTC+2 (CEST)
- Climate: BSk

Benegiles is a municipality located in the province of Zamora, Castile and León, Spain. According to the 2004 census (INE), the municipality has a population of 399 inhabitants.
