= Torres del Carrizal =

Coordinates: 41°37′N 5°40′W

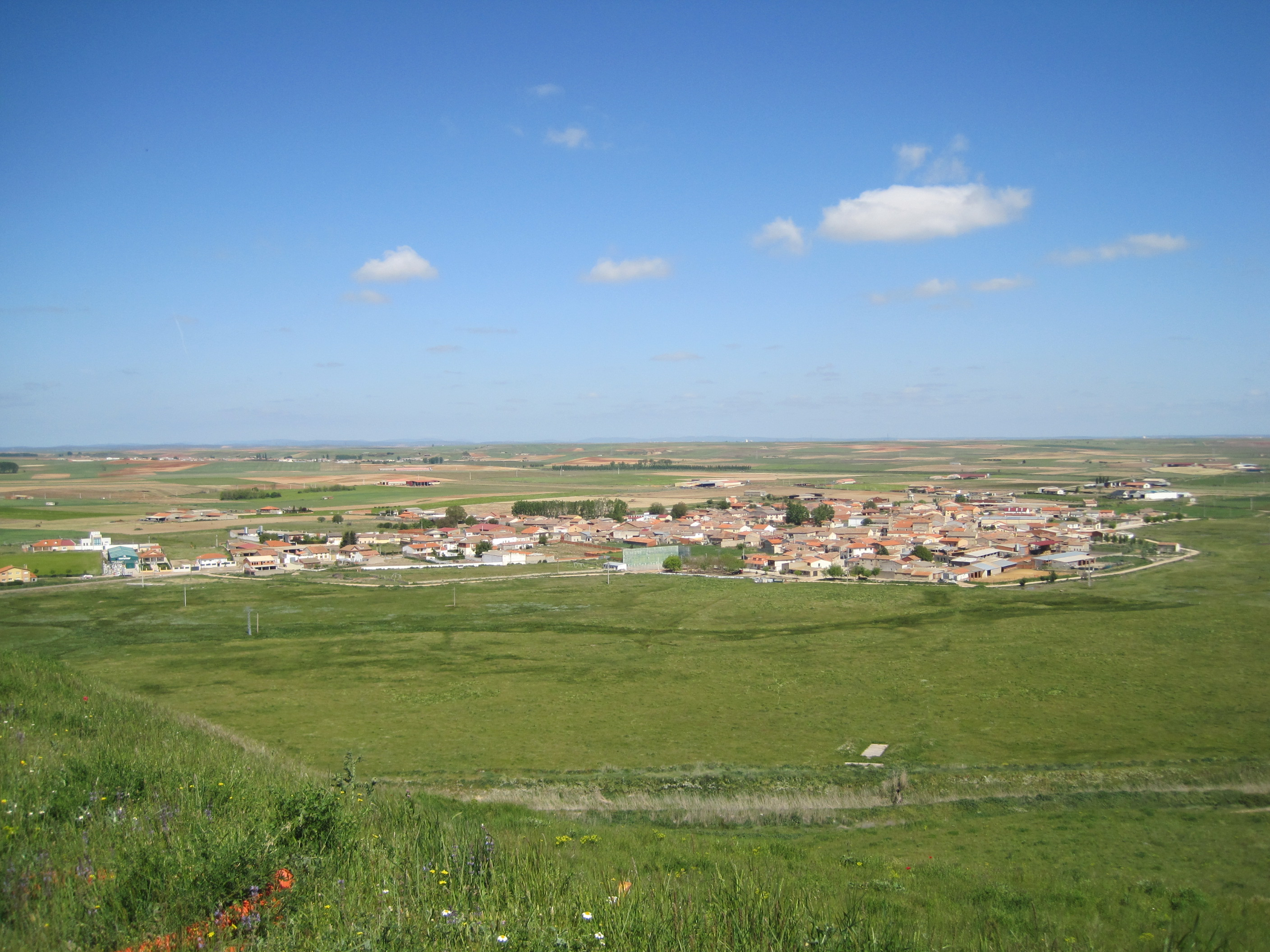
- Interactive map of Torres del Carrizal
- Country: Spain
- Autonomous community: Castile and León
- Province: Zamora
- Municipality: Torres del Carrizal

Area
  - Total: 30 km^{2} (12 sq mi)

Population (2025-01-01)
  - Total: 413
  - Density: 14/km^{2} (36/sq mi)
- Time zone: UTC+1 (CET)
  - Summer (DST): UTC+2 (CEST)
- Climate: BSk

Torres del Carrizal is a municipality located in the province of Zamora, Castile and León, Spain. According to the 2004 census (INE), the municipality has a population of 501 inhabitants.
