= Piedrahita de Castro =

Coordinates: 41°41′N 5°43′W

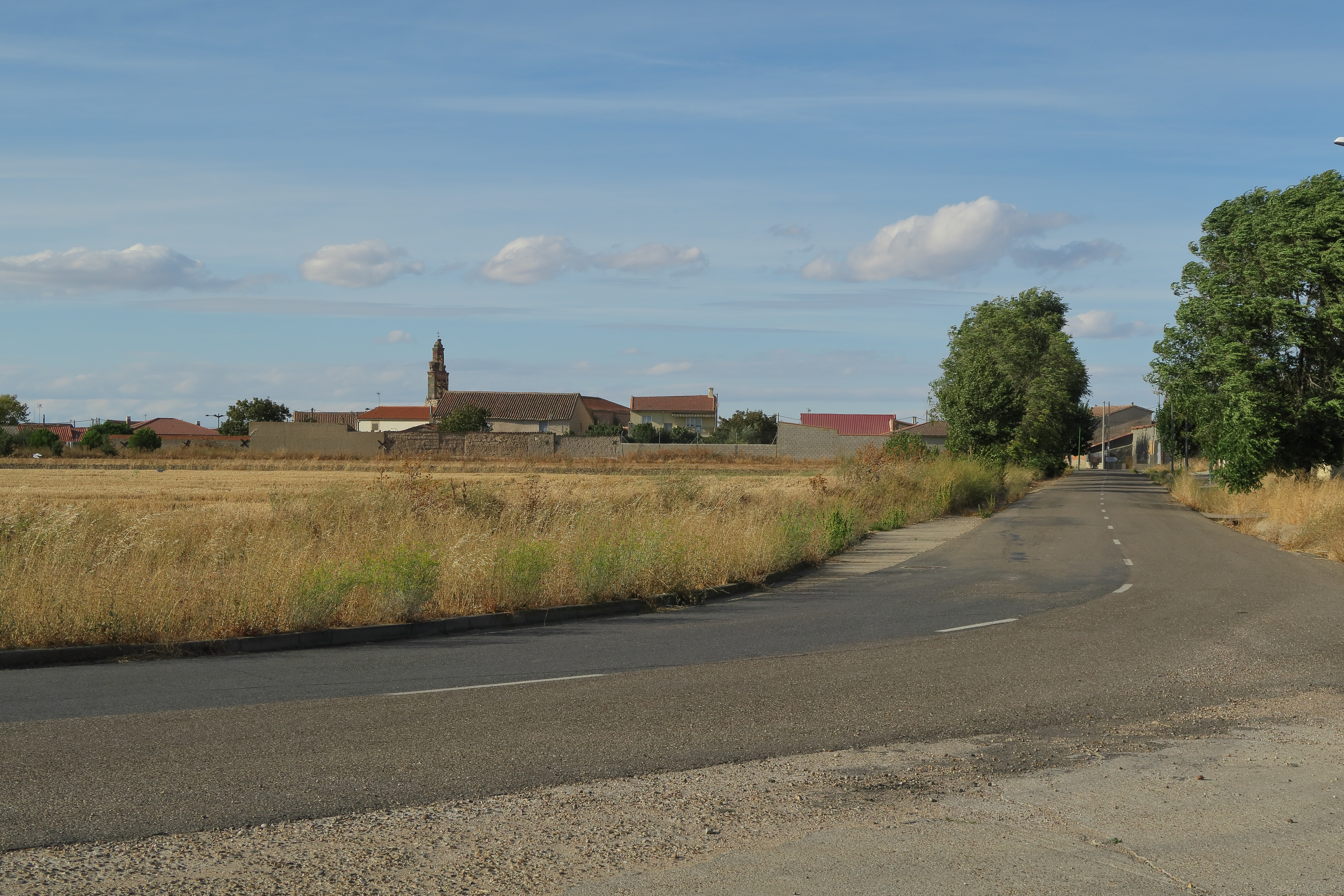

- Flag Coat of arms
- Interactive map of Piedrahita de Castro
- Country: Spain
- Autonomous community: Castile and León
- Province: Zamora
- Municipality: Piedrahita de Castro

Area
  - Total: 21 km^{2} (8.1 sq mi)

Population (2025-01-01)
  - Total: 104
  - Density: 5.0/km^{2} (13/sq mi)
- Time zone: UTC+1 (CET)
  - Summer (DST): UTC+2 (CEST)
- Climate: Csb

Piedrahita de Castro (Leonese: Piedrafita de Castru) is a municipality located in the province of Zamora, Castile and León, Spain. According to the 2004 census (INE), the municipality has a population of 138 inhabitants.
