= Pajares de la Lampreana =

Place in Castile and León, Spain

Coordinates: 41°43′N 5°42′W

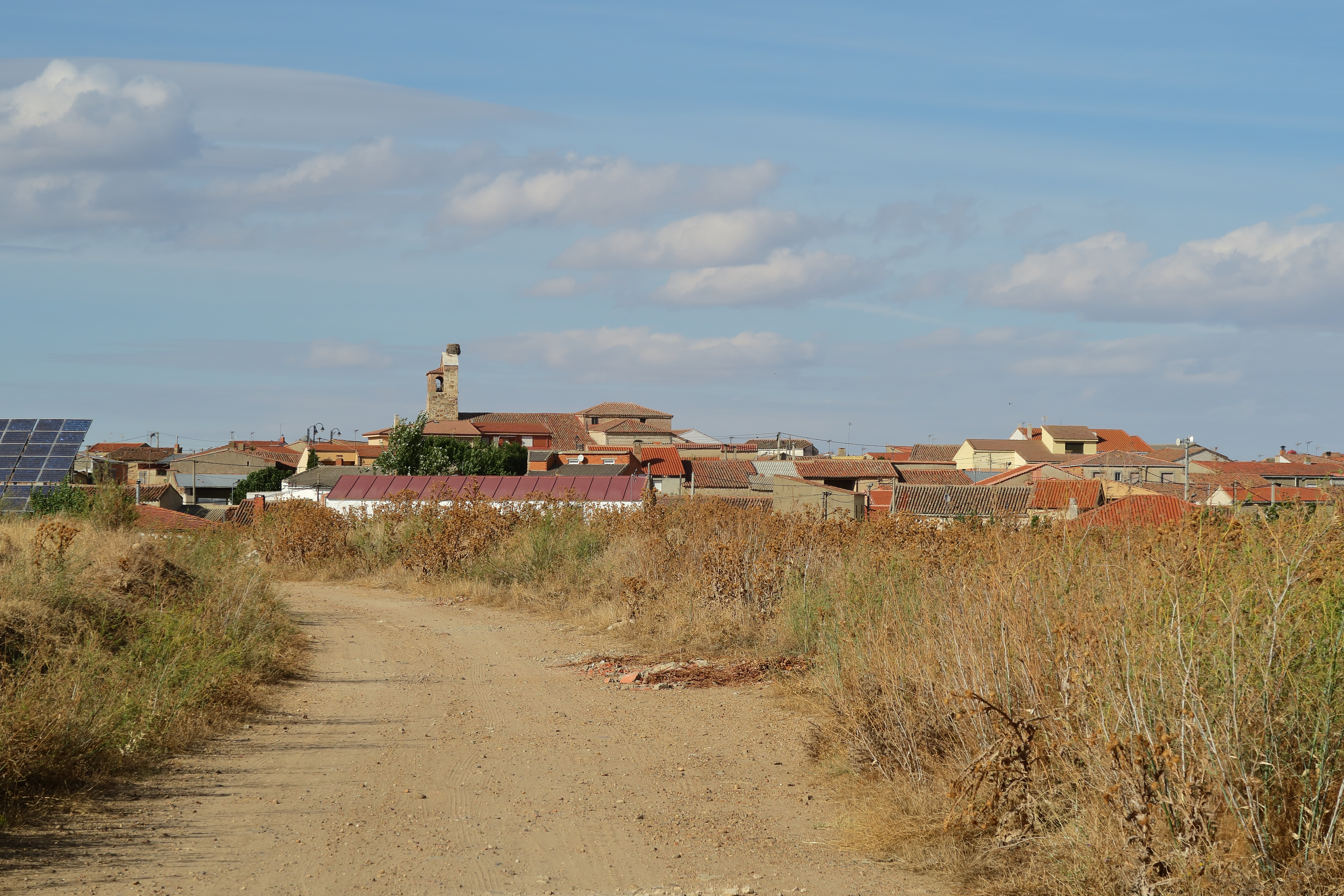

- Flag Coat of arms
- Interactive map of Pajares de la Lampreana
- Country: Spain
- Autonomous community: Castile and León
- Province: Zamora
- Municipality: Pajares de la Lampreana

Area
  - Total: 27.95 km^{2} (10.79 sq mi)
- Elevation: 696 m (2,283 ft)

Population (2025-01-01)
  - Total: 282
  - Density: 10.1/km^{2} (26.1/sq mi)
- Time zone: UTC+1 (CET)
  - Summer (DST): UTC+2 (CEST)
- Climate: Csb

Pajares de la Lampreana is a municipality located in the province of Zamora, Castile and León, Spain. According to the 2004 census (INE), the municipality had a population of 496 inhabitants.
