= Takeshita Station =

Railway station in Fukuoka, Japan

JB 01 Takeshita Station 竹下駅
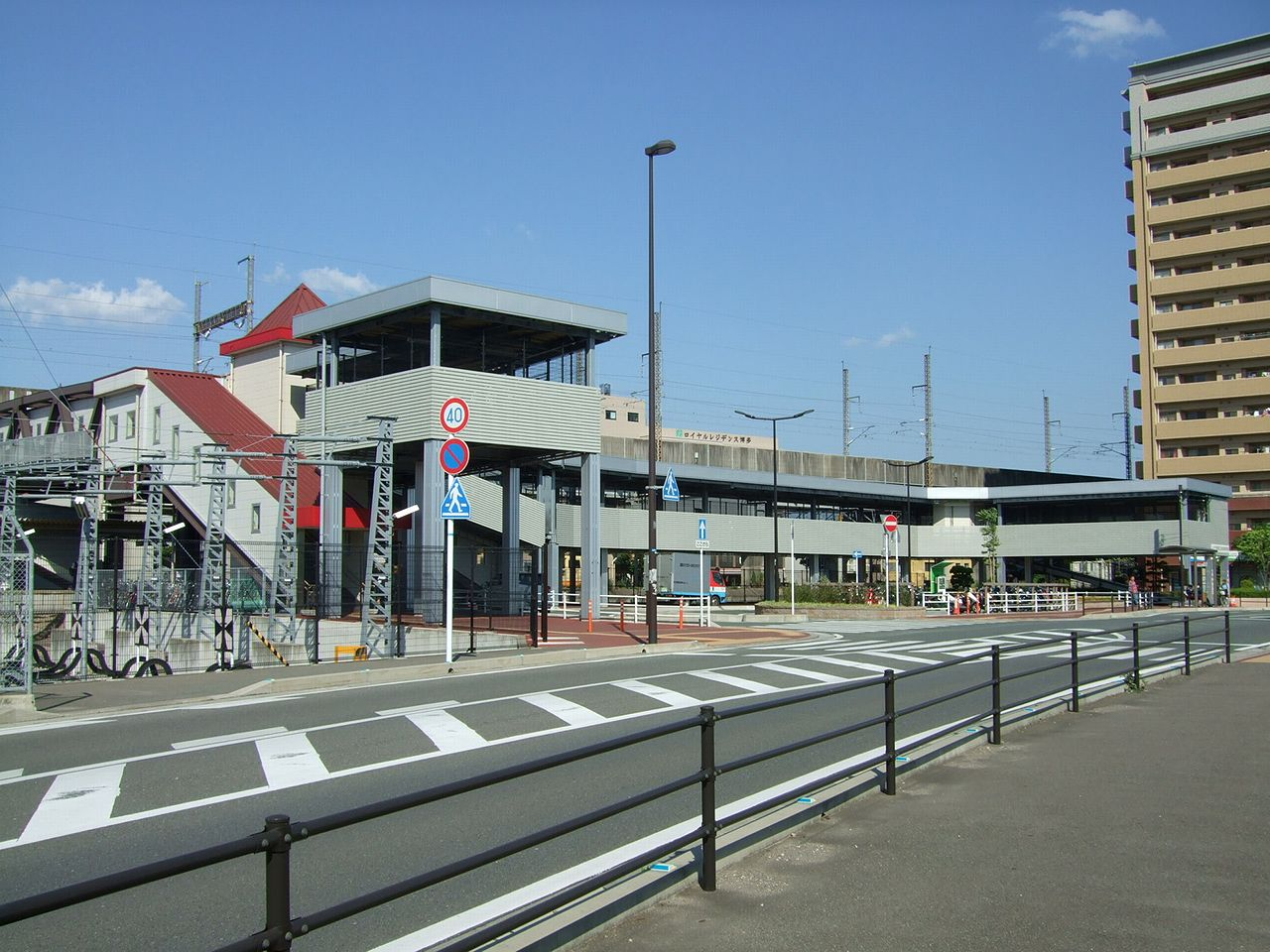
- Takeshita station in 2015

General information
- Location: 4-16-16 Takeshita, Hakata-ku, Fukuoka-shi, Fukuoka-ken; Japan
- Coordinates: 33°34′07″N 130°25′53″E
- Operator: JR Kyushu
- Line: JB Kagoshima Main Line
- Distance: 80.9 km (50.3 mi) from Mojikō
- Platforms: 1 island platform
- Tracks: 2 + 2 passing loops + numerous sidings

Construction
- Structure type: At grade

Other information
- Website: Official website

History
- Opened: 21 September 1913

Passengers
- FY2020: 6861 daily
- Rank: 16th (among JR Kyushu stations)

Services
Preceding station	JR Kyushu	Following station
Sasabaru towards Kagoshima	Kagoshima Main Line Local	Hakata towards Mojikō
Location
- Location within Fukuoka Prefecture Location within Japan

Takeshita Station (竹下駅, Takeshita-eki) is a passenger railway station located in Hakata-ku, Fukuoka, Fukuoka City, Fukuoka Prefecture, Japan. IT is operated by JR Kyushu.

== Lines ==
The station is served by the Kagoshima Main Line and is located 80.9 km from the starting point of the line at Mojikō.

== Layout ==
The station consists of an island platform serving two tracks, connected by an elevated station building. The station building is located under the elevated Kyushu Shinkansen tracks on the east side of the station, and although it is an elevated station, the station building is located east of the platforms. Two through-tracks run on either side of the platform tracks and several sidings branch these two tracks.

== History ==
The station was opened by Japanese Government Railways (JGR) on 21 September 1913 as an added station on the existing Kagoshima Main Line track. With the privatization of Japanese National Railways (JNR), the successor of JGR, on 1 April 1987, JR Kyushu took over control of the station.

Since 2009 the station has been subject to extensive renovations which have included the installation of elevators, roofing and new stairs. In the past, it was only possible to enter and exit the station from the east side of the station, but in 2011 a new passageway was built connecting the west side of the station and the station building, making it possible to enter and exit from the west side. Additionally, in 2013, a station plaza was constructed in front of the station's west exit.

== Bus connections ==
The station is served by the Nishitetsu local bus routes from Takeshita bus stop (竹下バス停, Takeshita-basu-tei)

- □ 46
  - Asahi Beer (アサヒビール前)→Eki-minami nichōme (駅南二丁目)→Ekimae yonchōme (駅前四丁目)→Hakata Station→Canal City Hakata→Haruyoshi (春吉)→Tenjin→Shimin kaikan mae (市民会館前)→Hakata Futō (博多埠頭)
- ■ 46
  - Gojūkawa itchome (五十川一丁目)→Gojūkawa (五十川)→Ijiri Station→Minami-Fukuoka Station→Zasshonokuma eigyōsho (雑餉隈営業所)

== Passenger statistics ==
In fiscal 2020, the station was used by an average of 6861 passengers daily (boarding passengers only), and it ranked 16th among the busiest stations of JR Kyushu.

== Surrounding area ==
- Asahi beer plant. This plant includes a beer garden that is popular with visitors during the summer season.
- Kyushu University School of Design.
- Nishitetsu Ōhashi Station (1.08 km south-west of Takeshita Station)

== See also ==
- List of railway stations in Japan
