= Ijiri Station =

Railway station in Fukuoka, Japan

Ijiri Station 井尻駅
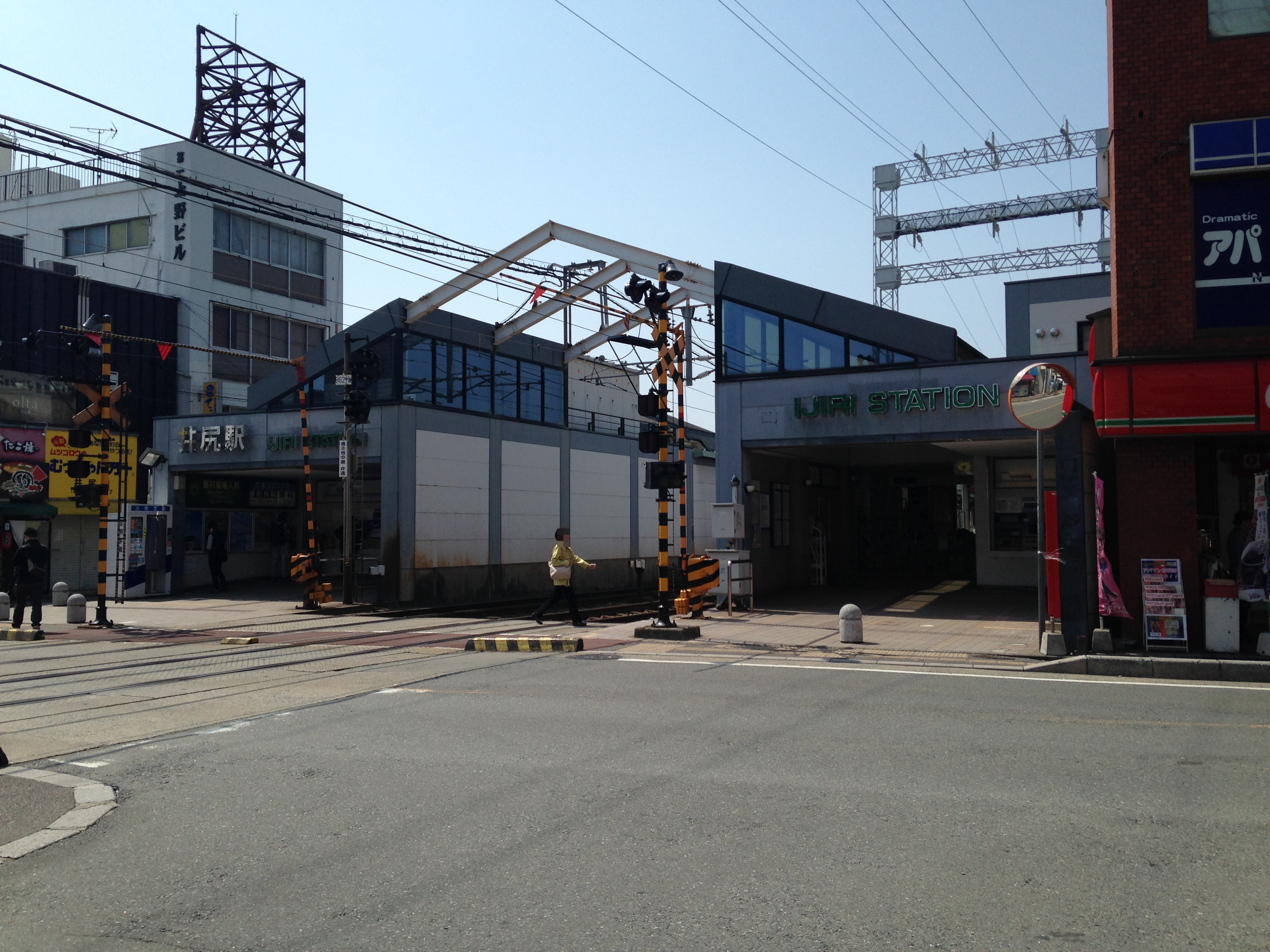
- Ijiri Station

General information
- Location: 1, Ijiri 5-chōme, Minami-ku, Fukuoka-shi, Fukuoka-ken; Japan
- Coordinates: 33°33′07″N 130°26′36″E
- Operator: Nishi-Nippon Railroad
- Line: ■ Tenjin Ōmuta Line
- Distance: 6.1 km from Nishitetsu Fukuoka (Tenjin) Station.
- Platforms: 2 side platforms
- Connections: Bus stop

Other information
- Station code: T06
- Website: Official website

History
- Opened: 12 April 1924

Passengers
- FY2022: 20,625

Services
Preceding station	Nishitetsu	Following station
Ōhashi towards Nishitetsu Fukuoka (Tenjin)	Tenjin Ōmuta Line Local	Zasshonokuma towards Ōmuta
Location
- Location within Fukuoka Prefecture Location within Japan

Ijiri Station (井尻駅, Ijiri-eki) is a passenger railway station located in Minami-ku, Fukuoka Fukuoka Prefecture, Japan. It is operated by the private transportation company Nishi-Nippon Railroad (NNR), and has station number T06.

== Lines ==
The station is served by the Nishitetsu Tenjin Ōmuta Line and is 6.1 kilometers from the starting point of the line at Nishitetsu Fukuoka (Tenjin) Station.

== Station layout ==
The station consists of two opposed side platforms connected by a footbridge.

== Platforms ==
1	■ Tenjin Ōmuta Line	for Futsukaichi, Kurume and Ōmuta
2	■ Tenjin Ōmuta Line	for Fukuoka

== History ==
The station was opened on 12 April 1924.

== Passenger statistics ==
In fiscal 2022, the station was used by 20,625 passengers daily.

== Surrounding area ==
- Sasabaru Station - Kyushu Railway Company (JR Kyushu) Kagoshima Main Line

== See also ==
- List of railway stations in Japan
