= Sakuranamiki Station =

Railway station in Fukuoka, Japan

Sakuranamiki Station 桜並木駅
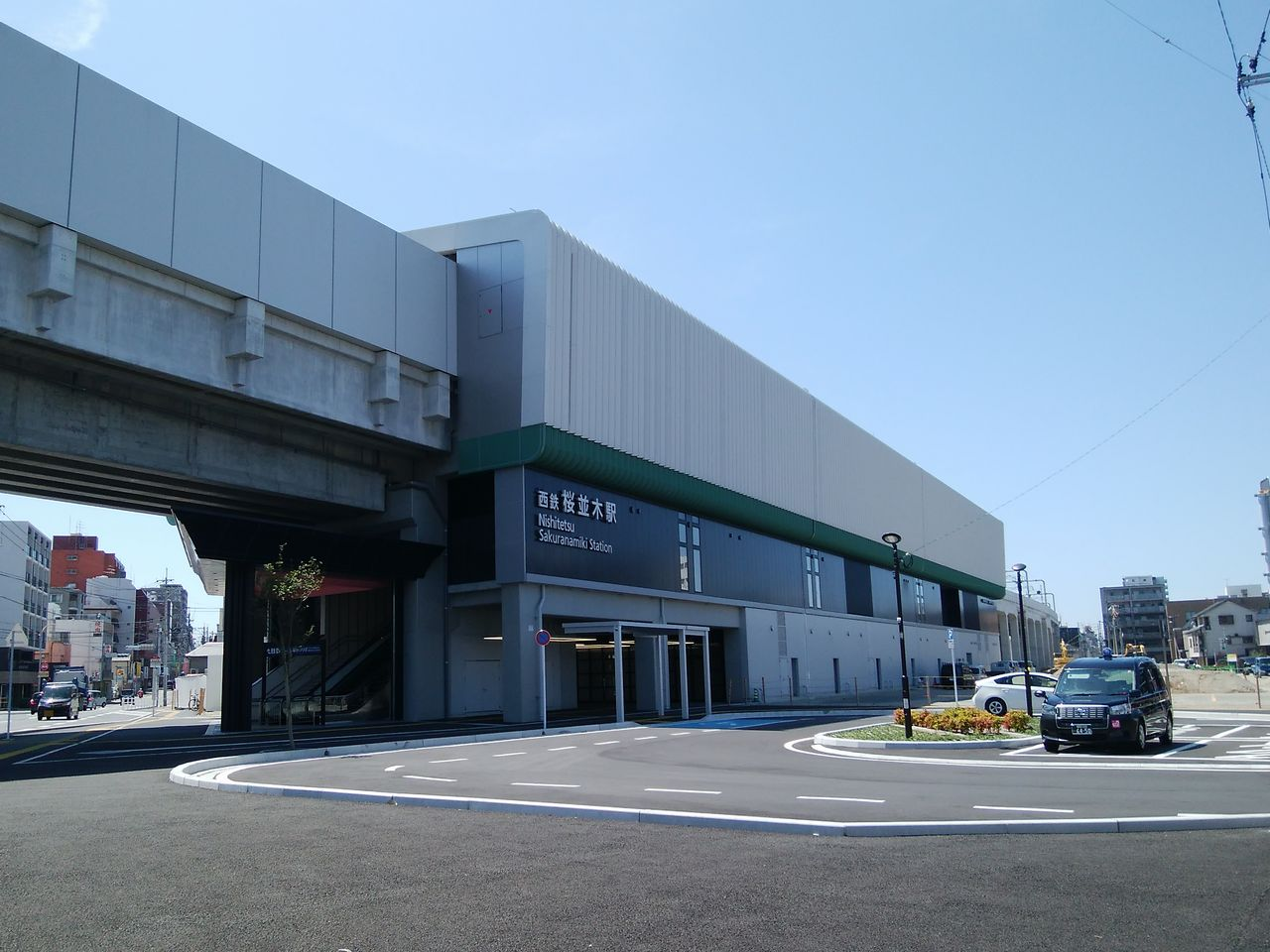
- Sakuranamiki Station in May 2024

General information
- Location: 3-4-1 Takeoka-cho, Hakata-ku, Fukuoka-shi, Fukuoka-ken; Japan
- Coordinates: 33°32′41″N 130°27′59″E
- Operator: Nishitetsu
- Line: ■ Tenjin Ōmuta Line
- Platforms: 2 side platforms
- Tracks: 2
- Connections: Bus stop

Construction
- Structure type: Elevated
- Accessible: Yes

Other information
- Station code: T08
- Website: Official website

History
- Opened: 16 March 2024

Passengers
- FY2024: 5368

Services
Preceding station	Nishitetsu	Following station
Zasshonokuma towards Nishitetsu Fukuoka (Tenjin)	Tenjin Ōmuta Line Local	Kasugabaru towards Ōmuta
Location
- Location within Fukuoka Prefecture Location within Japan

Sakuranamiki Station (桜並木駅, Sakuranamiki-eki) is a passenger railway station located in Hakata-ku, Fukuoka Fukuoka Prefecture, Japan. It is operated by the private railroad company Nishi-Nippon Railroad (NNR) and has station number T08.

== Lines ==
The station is served by the Nishitetsu Tenjin Ōmuta Line and the distance between this station and the adjacent Zasshonokuma Station is approximately 0.5 kilometres. Only Local trains serve the station.

== Layout ==
The station has two side platforms serving two tracks on the third floor of the building, ticket gates that lead to two exits on the second floor, and retail areas on the first and second floors. The platforms are able to accommodate trains that are up to eight cars long.

== History ==
Construction of a rail viaduct to elevate a section of the Tenjin Ōmuta Line from Zasshonokuma Station to Shimoōri Station commenced in 2010. Before then, the original plan included relocating Zasshonokuma Station to near the former Nishitetsu Zasshonokuma Bus Office. A subsequent change of plans in 2007 resulted in a new station being constructed in that area and Zasshonokuma Station remaining in its existing location instead.

Details of the new station were first officially announced on 19 November 2021. On 27 July 2022, the name of this station was finalised as "Sakuranamiki".

Sakuranamiki Station opened on 16 March 2024.

== Passenger statistics ==
In fiscal 2024, the station was used by an average of 5368 passengers daily.

== Surrounding area ==
- Minami-Fukuoka Station - Kyushu Railway Company (JR Kyushu) Kagoshima Main Line
