= Ōhashi Station =

Railway station in Fukuoka, Japan

Ōhashi Station 大橋駅
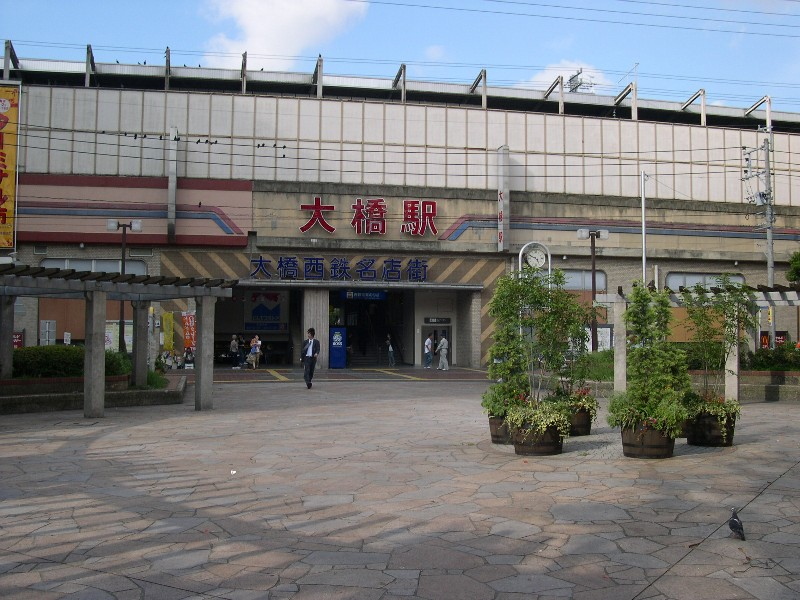
- Ōhashi Station

General information
- Location: 5-1, Ōhashi 1-chōme, Minami-ku, Fukuoka-shi, Fukuoka-ken; Japan
- Coordinates: 33°33′33″N 130°25′35″E
- Operator: Nishi-Nippon Railroad
- Line: ■ Tenjin Ōmuta Line
- Platforms: 2 island platforms
- Connections: Bus terminal

Construction
- Structure type: Elevated
- Accessible: Yes

Other information
- Station code: T05
- Website: Official website

History
- Opened: 12 April 1924

Passengers
- FY2022: 27,294

Services
Preceding station	Nishitetsu	Following station
Takamiya towards Nishitetsu Fukuoka (Tenjin)	Tenjin Ōmuta Line Local	Ijiri towards Ōmuta
Yakuin towards Nishitetsu Fukuoka (Tenjin)	Tenjin Ōmuta Line Express	Kasugabaru towards Ōmuta
Yakuin towards Nishitetsu Fukuoka (Tenjin)	Tenjin Ōmuta Line Limited Express	Kasugabaru towards Ōmuta
Location
- Location within Fukuoka Prefecture Location within Japan

Ōhashi Station (大橋駅, Ōhashi-eki) is a passenger railway station located in Minami-ku, Fukuoka Fukuoka Prefecture, Japan. It is operated by the private transportation company Nishi-Nippon Railroad (NNR), and has station number T05.

== Lines ==
The station is served by the Nishitetsu Tenjin Ōmuta Line and is 4.3 kilometers from the starting point of the line at Nishitetsu Fukuoka (Tenjin) Station.

== Station layout ==
The station consists of two elevated island platforms with the station building underneath.

== Platforms ==
1, 2	■ Tenjin Ōmuta Line	for Futsukaichi, Kurume and Ōmuta
3, 4	■ Tenjin Ōmuta Line	for Fukuoka

== History ==
The station was opened on 12 April 1924.

== Passenger statistics ==
In fiscal 2022, the station was used by 27,294 passengers daily.

== Surrounding area ==
- Fukuoka City Minami Ward Office
- Kyushu Central Hospital
- Kyushu University Ohashi Campus

== See also ==
- List of railway stations in Japan
