= Link Airs =

Link Airs リンク
IATA	ICAO	Call sign
-	-	-
- Founded: 5 April 2012
- Ceased operations: Early 2014 (filed for bankruptcy before starting operations)
- Hubs: Fukuoka Airport; Kitakyushu Airport
- Fleet size: 0 (planned:3)
- Destinations: 0 (planned:4)
- Headquarters: Hakata-ku, Fukuoka, Japan
- Key people: Akira Tosaya
- Website: linkairs.jp

Link Inc. (株式会社リンク, Kabushiki Gaisha Rinku) was a regional airline startup headquartered on the fifth floor of the Fukuoka Gion Daiichi Seimei Building (福岡祇園第一生命ビル Fukuoka Gion Daiichi Seimei Biru) in Hakata-ku, Fukuoka, Japan, which planned to serve Fukuoka Airport, Kitakyushu Airport, Matsuyama Airport and Miyazaki Airport. It filed for bankruptcy liquidation in January 2014 after failing to raise adequate capital for its operations, with 900 million yen of reported debt to around eighty creditors.

Link planned to begin operations in 2014 as a low-cost carrier that would offer beverages and other services at no additional charge. The airline had a technical and training support agreement with StarFlyer, and hoped to eventually have an initial public offering. It applied for an operating certificate in July 2013.

Link planned to take delivery of three ATR 72-600 aircraft in 2013 and 2014, to be leased from NAC Aviation Norway A/S, and would have been the first operator of ATR aircraft in Japan. CEO Koichi Sugiyama commented that the airline chose to use turboprop aircraft due to the short route lengths to be operated, where turboprop flight times would only be about five minutes longer than regional jet flight times.
