= Tōchō-ji =

Buddhist temple in Hakata, Fukuoka, Japan

- 東長寺
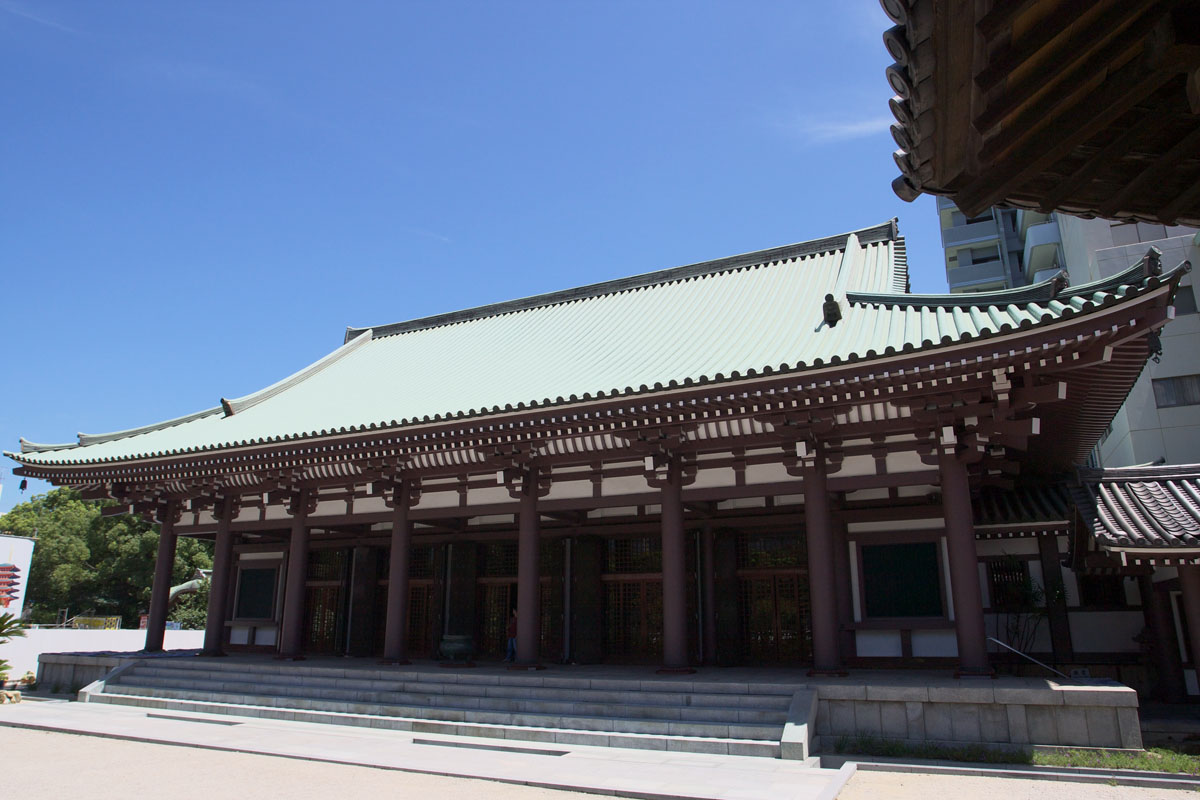
- Main hall of Tōchō-ji

Religion
- Affiliation: Buddhism
- Deity: Kannon
- Rite: Shingon

Location
- Location: Fukuoka
- Country: Japan
- Interactive map of Tōchō-ji
- Coordinates: 33.5952°N 130.4141°E

Architecture
- Founder: Kūkai
- Established: 806

Tōchō-ji (東長寺) is a Shingon temple in Hakata, Fukuoka, Japan. Its honorary sangō prefix is Nangakuzan (南岳山). It was founded by Kūkai in 806, making it the oldest Shingon temple on the island of Kyushu.

== History ==
According to tradition, Kūkai or Kobo-daishi set up this temple when he came back from China and prayed for the eastward dissemination of Tantric Buddhism. It was originally situated by the seaside, but after burning down at the end of the 16th century, it was relocated to the present site by Kuroda Tadayuki, the second lord of Chikuzen province. The second, the third, and the eighth lord of the Kuroda clan are buried here.

== Senju kannon ==
The temple houses a senju kannon ('thousand-armed Goddess of Mercy', Avalokiteshvara) statue made in the Heian era. It was carved from a single log of Chinese black pine. The statue is only 87 centimeters in height but stands up with a stately atmosphere. As a "hidden Buddha" it is concealed and can only be seen during the birthday celebrations for Kūkai. In 1904, it was designated as a national treasure.

== Rokkaku-dō ==
This is a hexagonal (rokkaku) building with revolving bookshelves for sutras and sculptures. In 1842, the local merchant Bungoya Eizō raised money from merchants throughout western Japan and invited a carpenter named Itō Hirazaemon to build this sanctum. The building is open on the 28th of every month

== Daibutsu ==
The carving of a daibutsu, or large Buddhist statue, started in 1988 and it took four years to finish. The statue is 10.8 meters (35 ft) in height and 30 tons in weight. After the daibutsus of Nara and Kamakura, this is the largest statue of a seated Buddha in Japan. The ring of light behind the Buddha stands 16.1 meters (53 ft) in height and is carved with numerous images of Buddha. Besides the statue is a treasure exhibition hall.

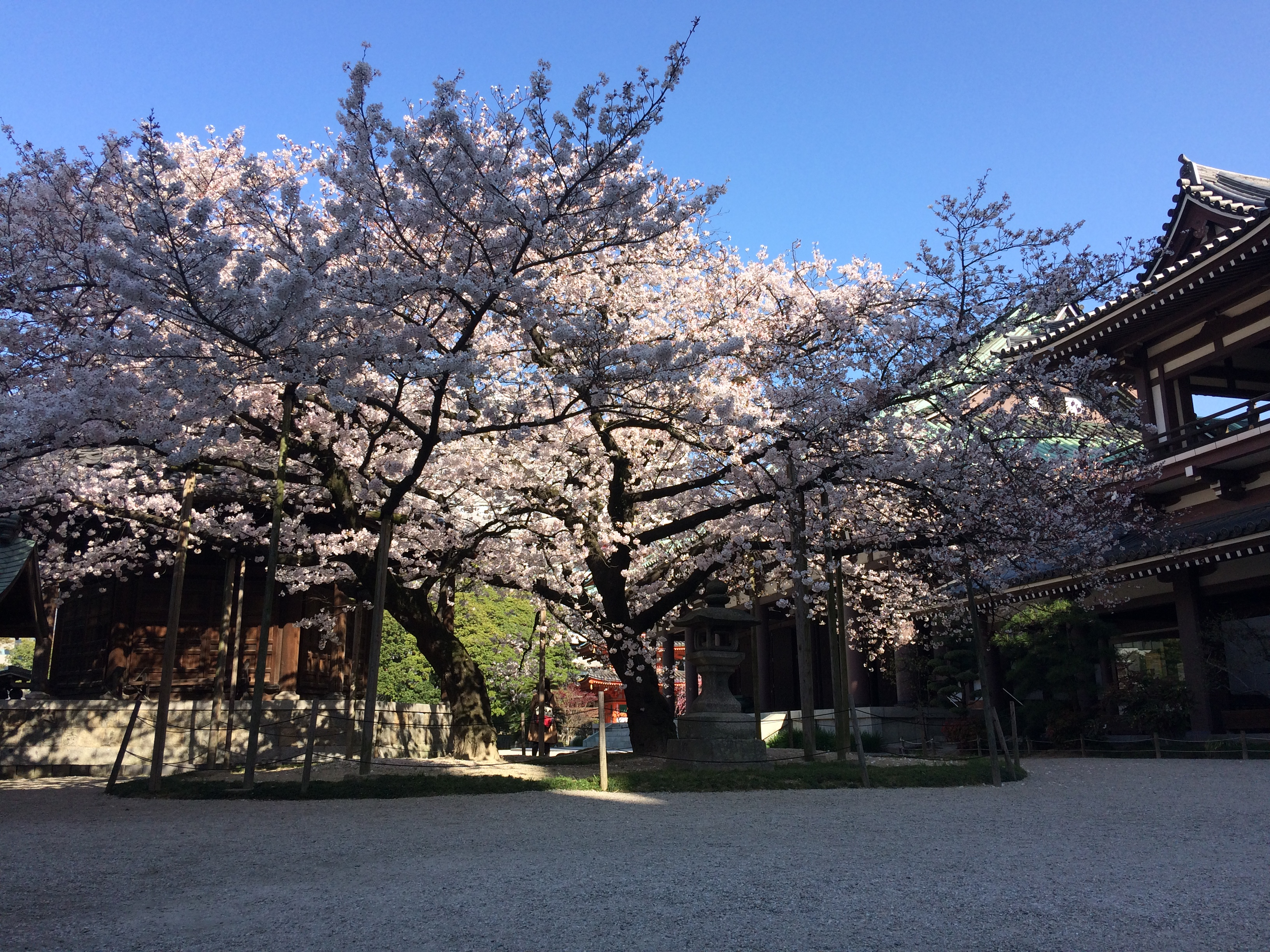

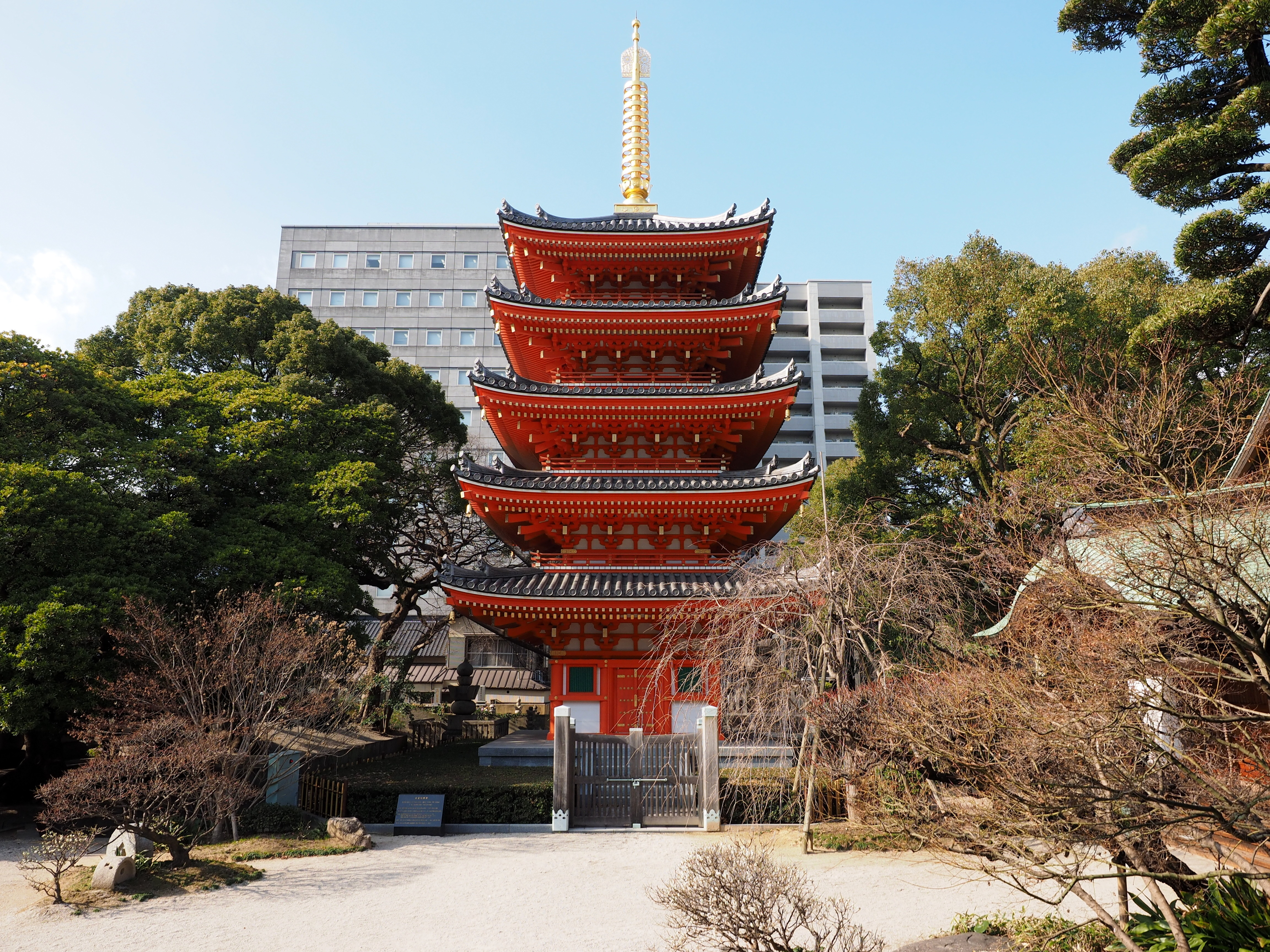

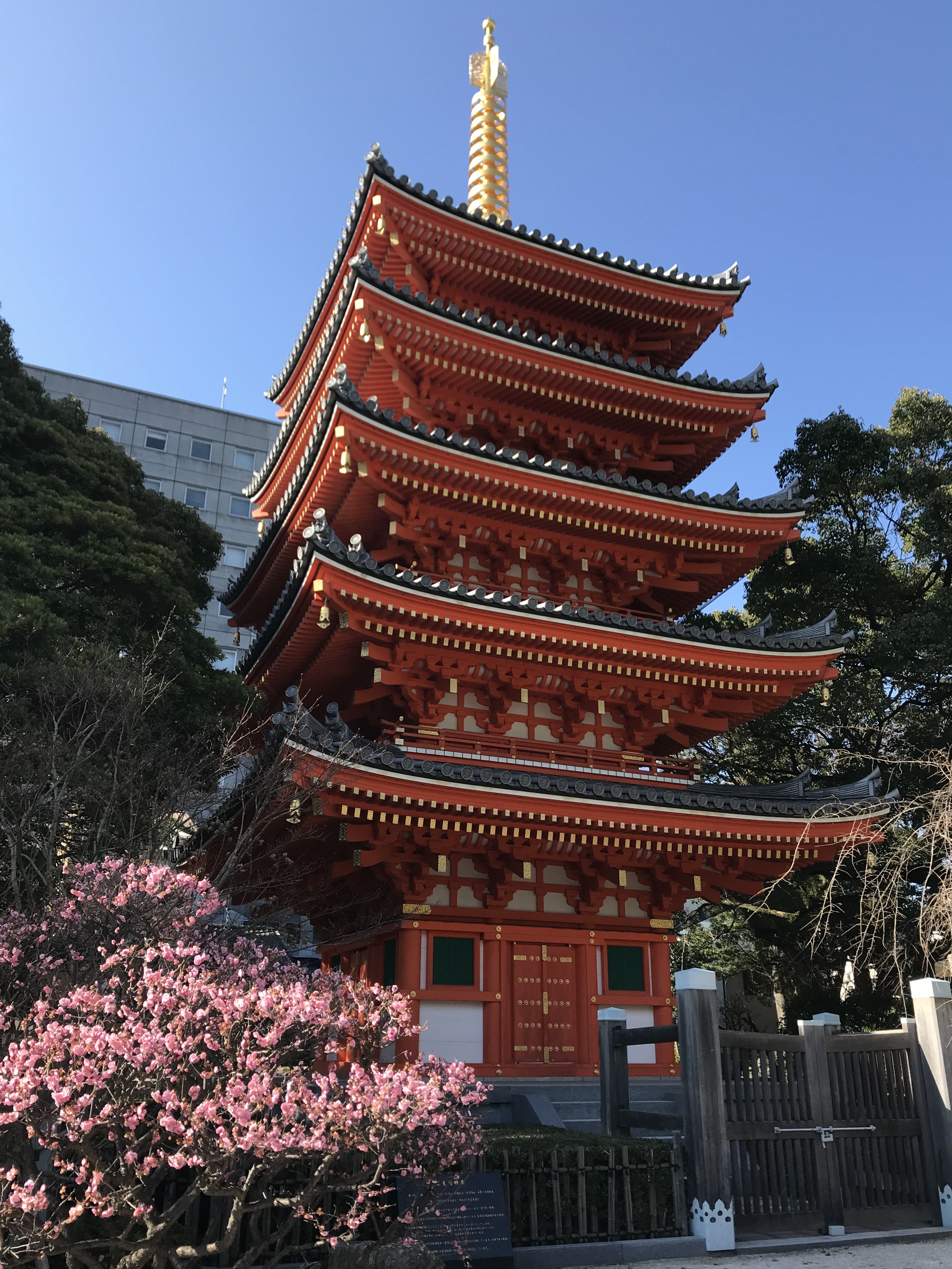

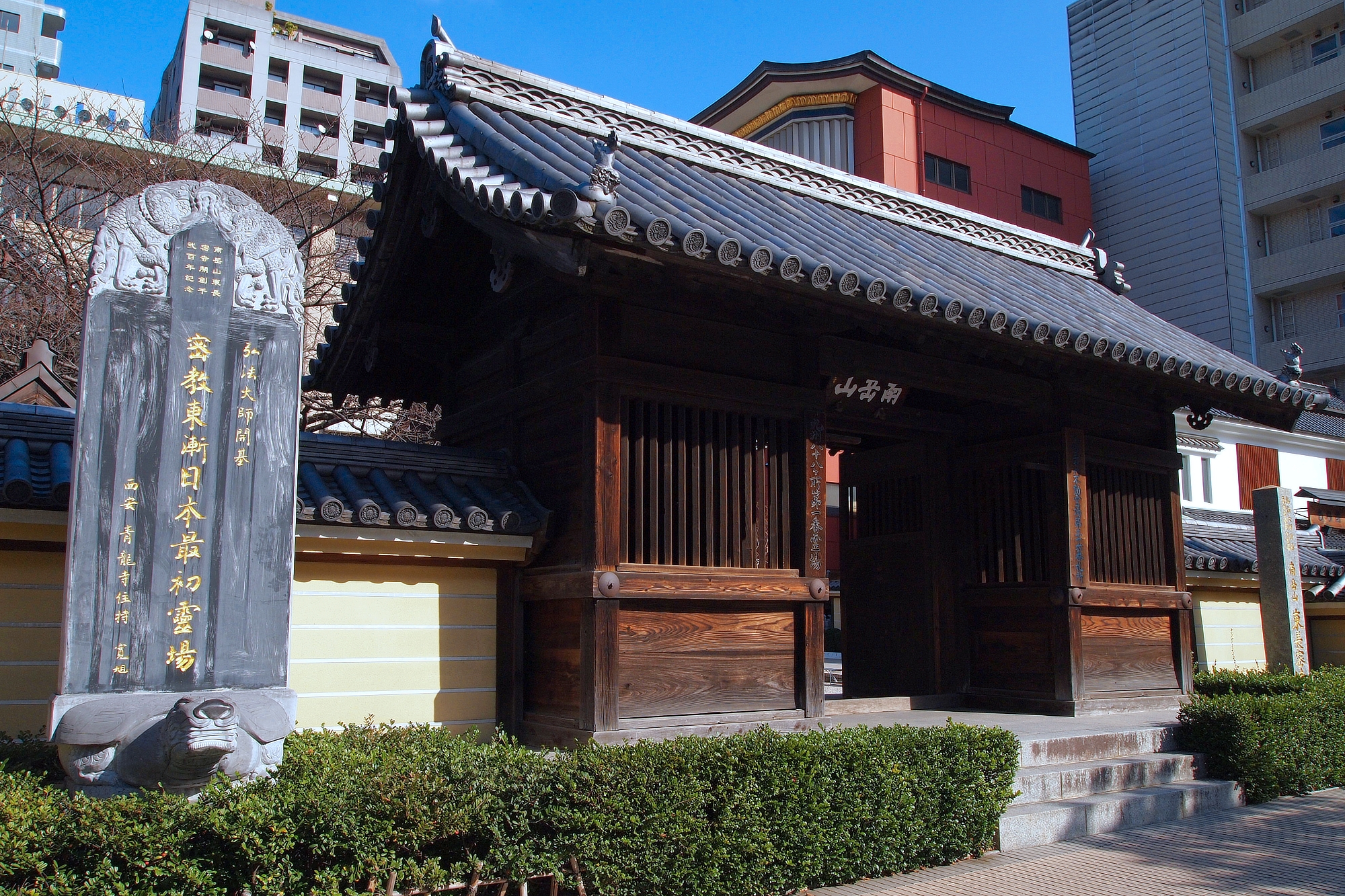

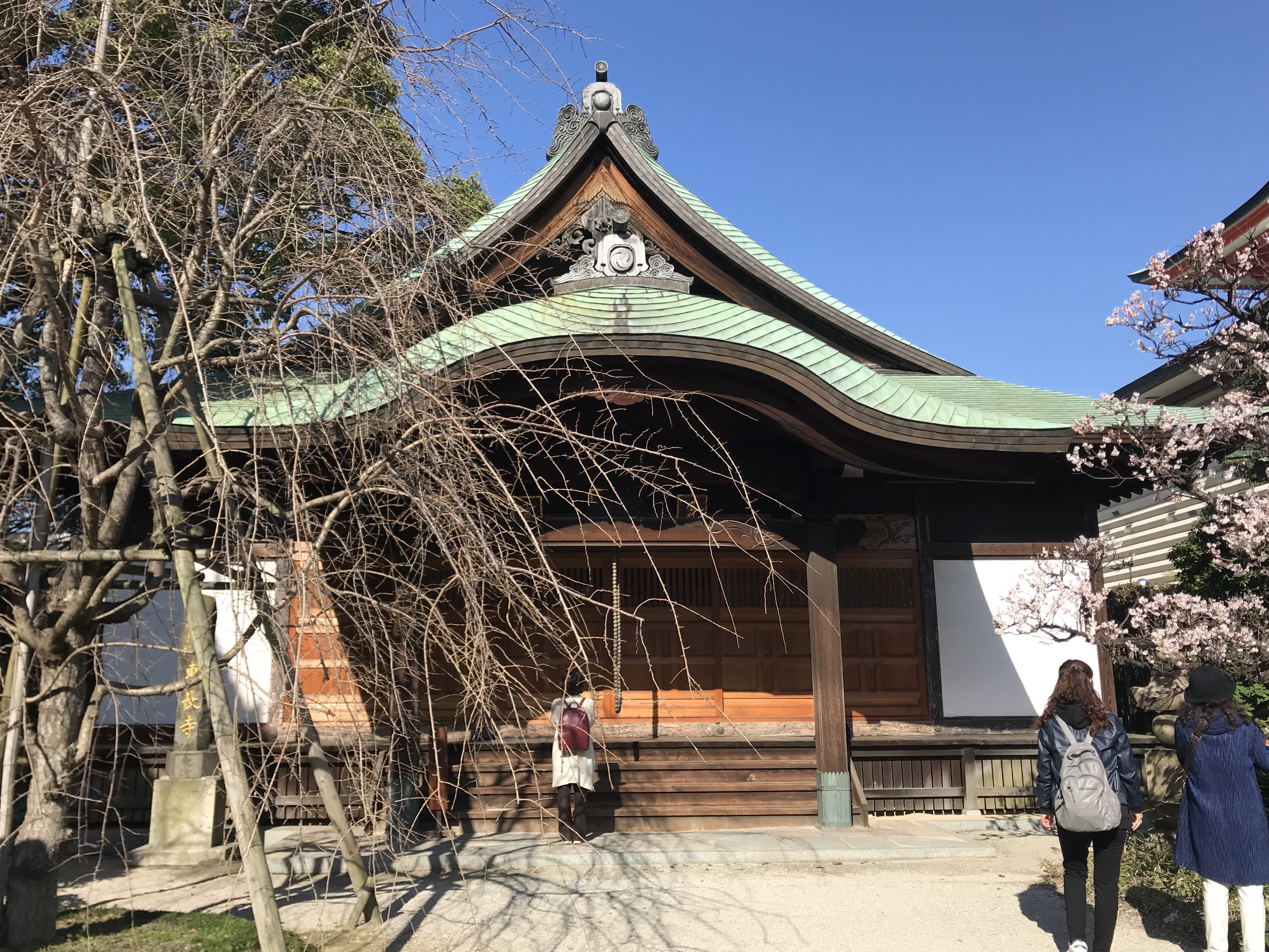

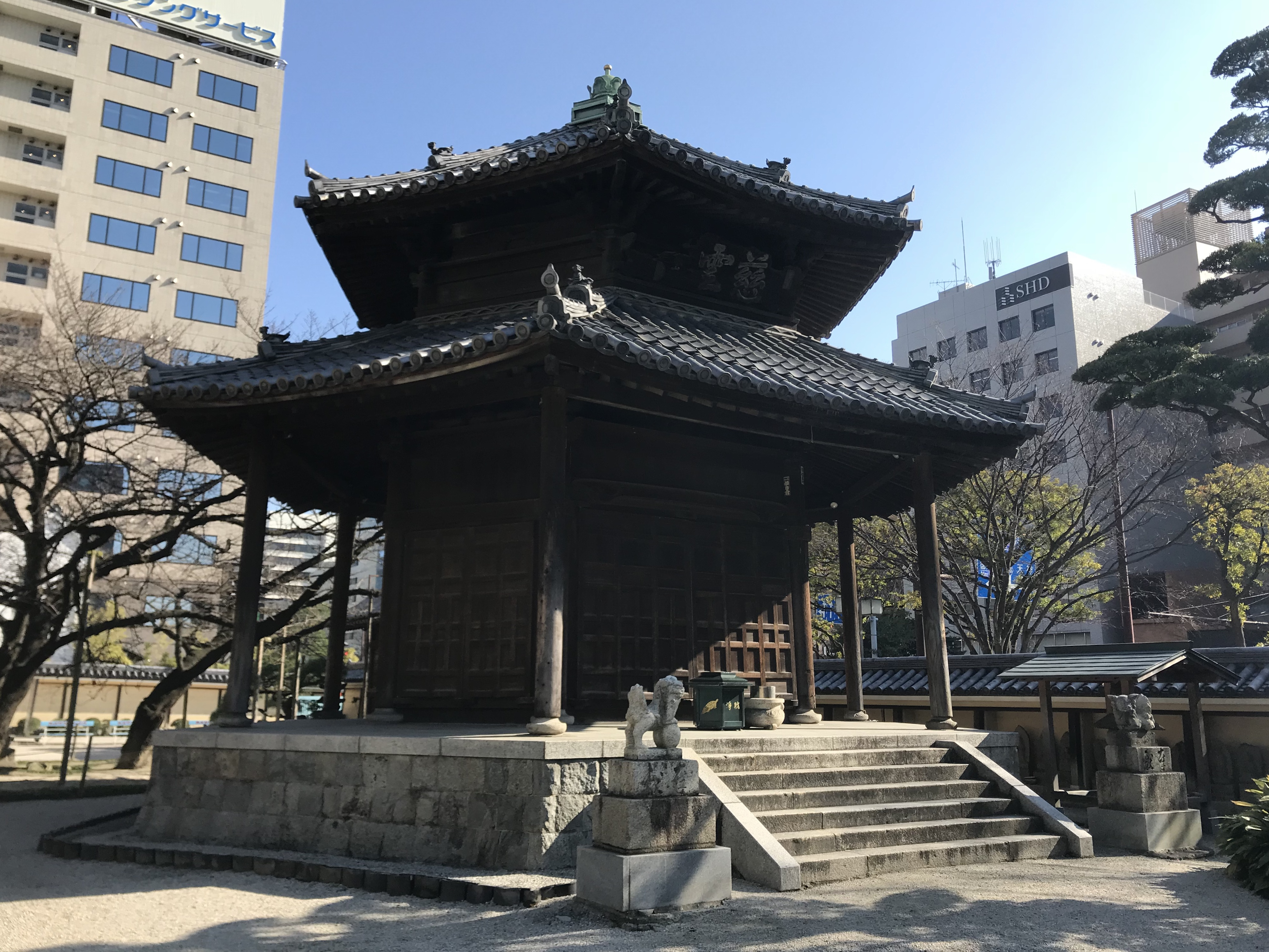

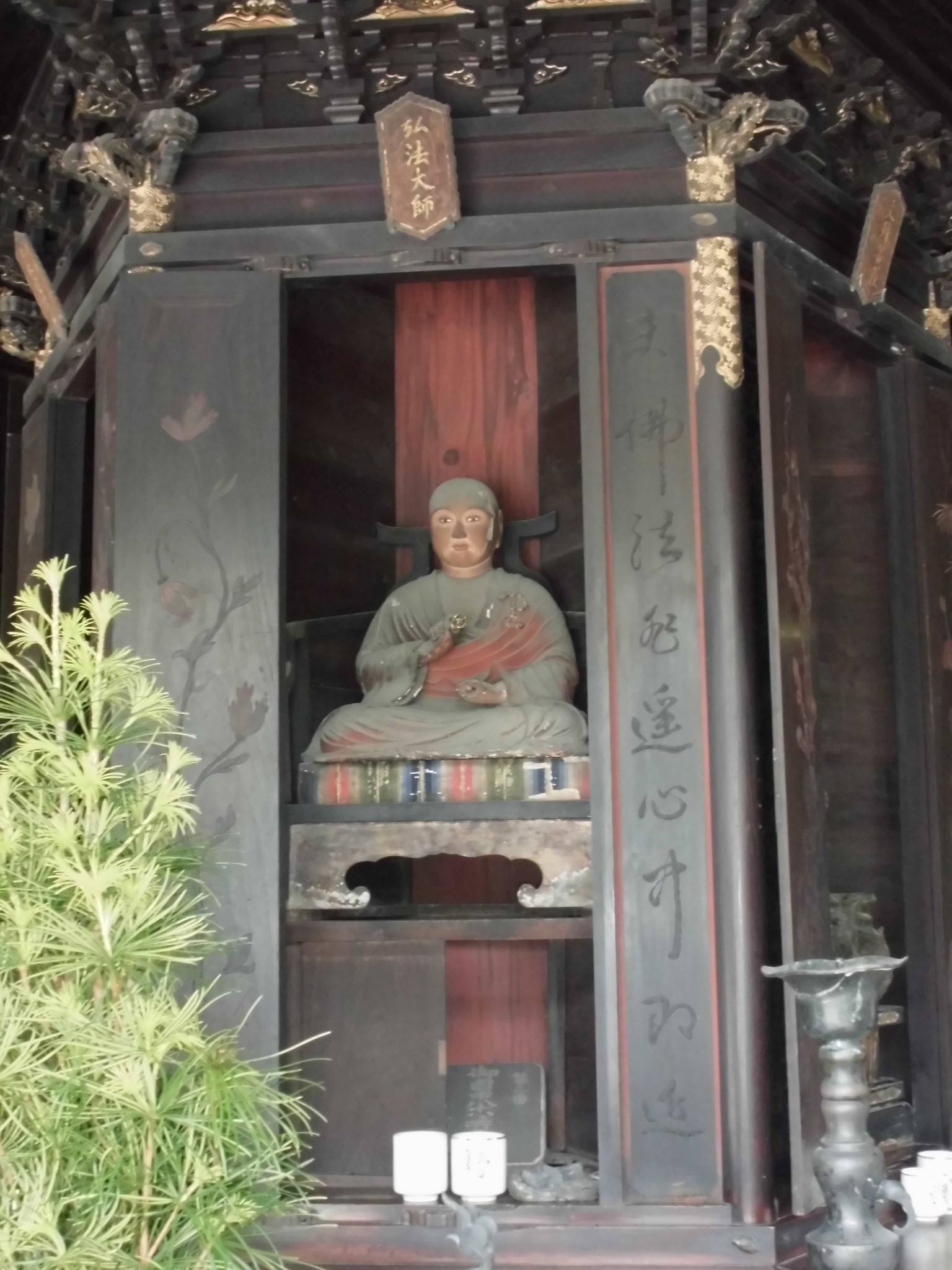
Kūkai

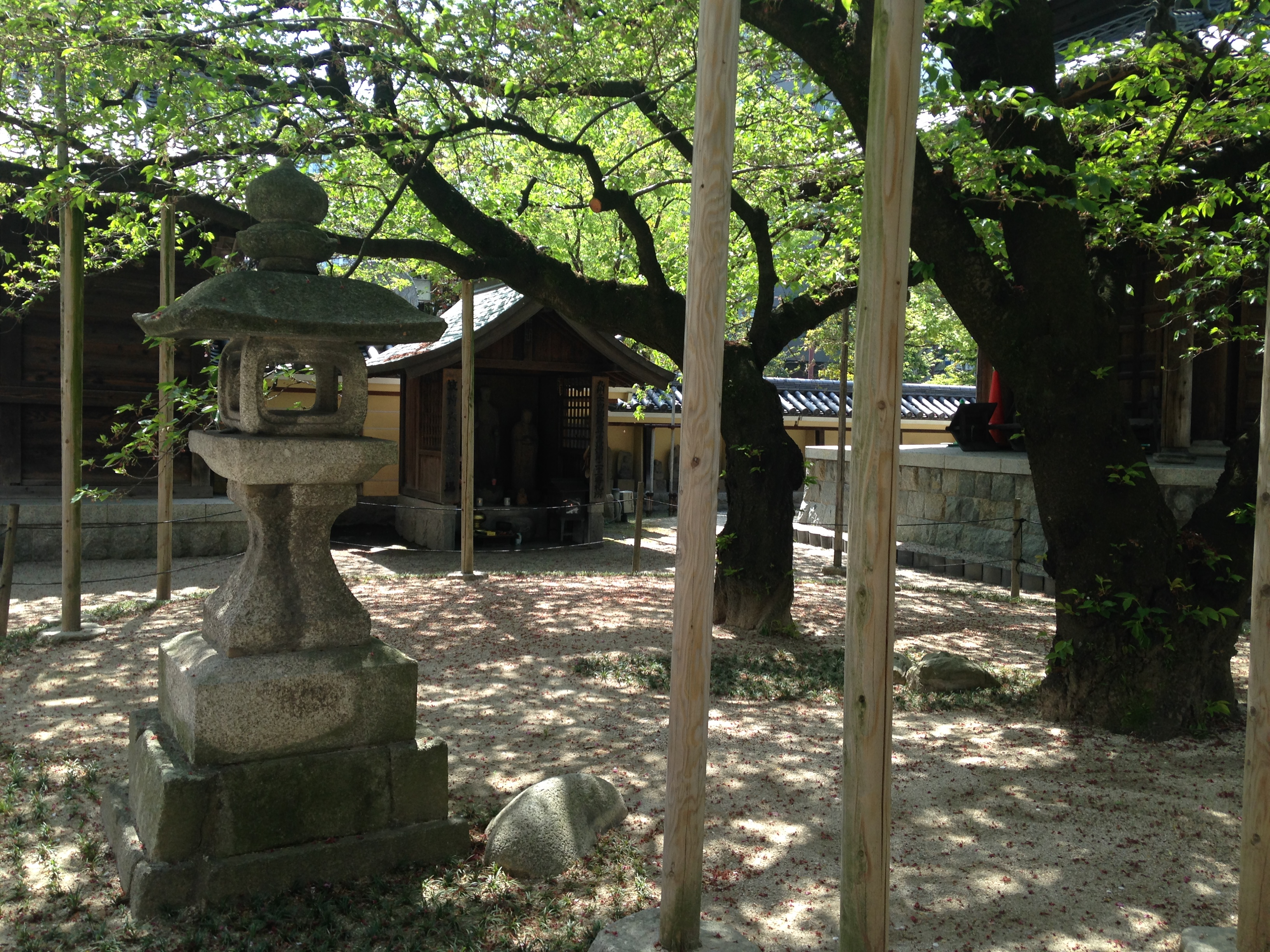

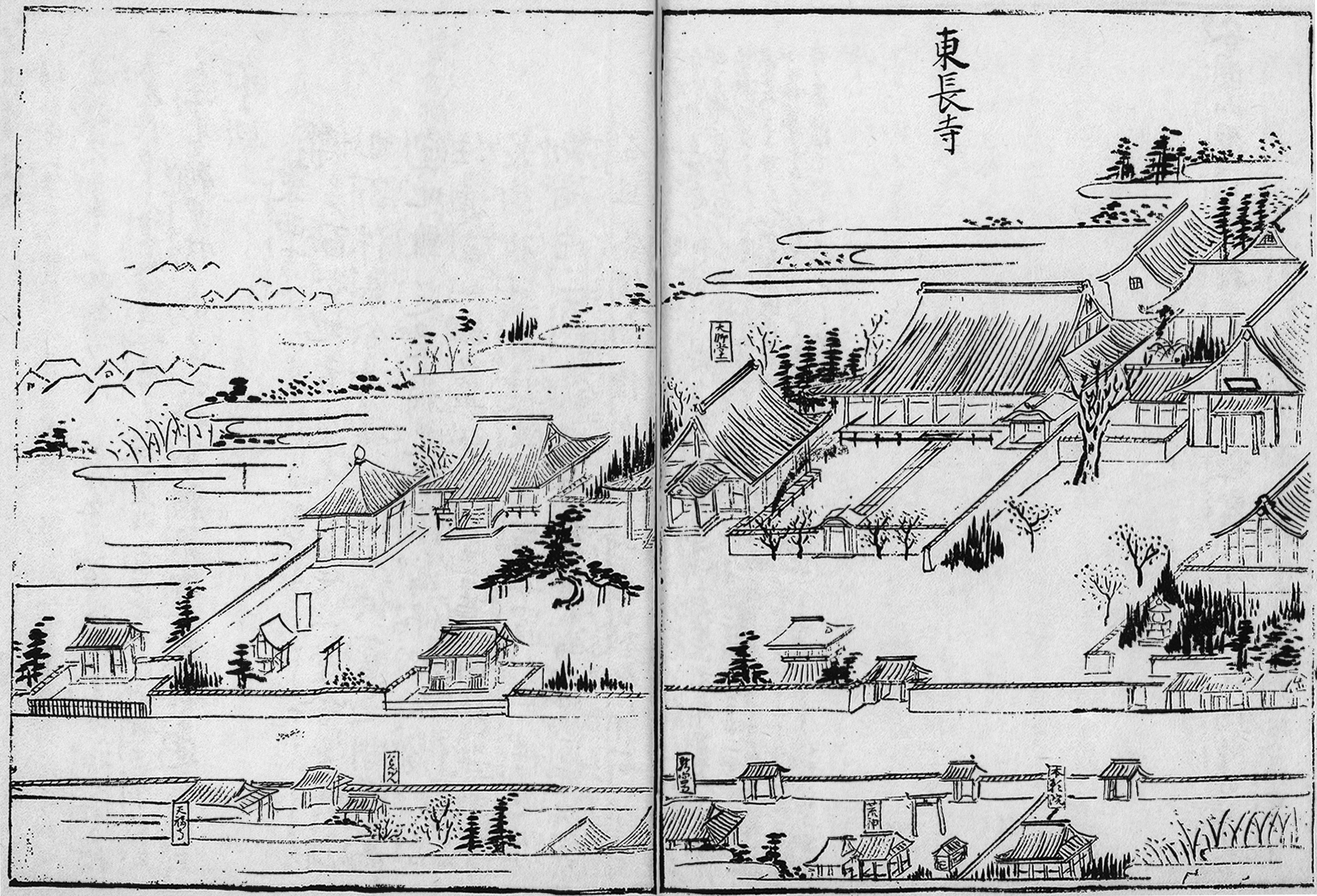
1821

== External references ==
- Yokanavi.com
