= Rakusui-en =

Coordinates: 33°35′13.1″N 130°24′48.2″E

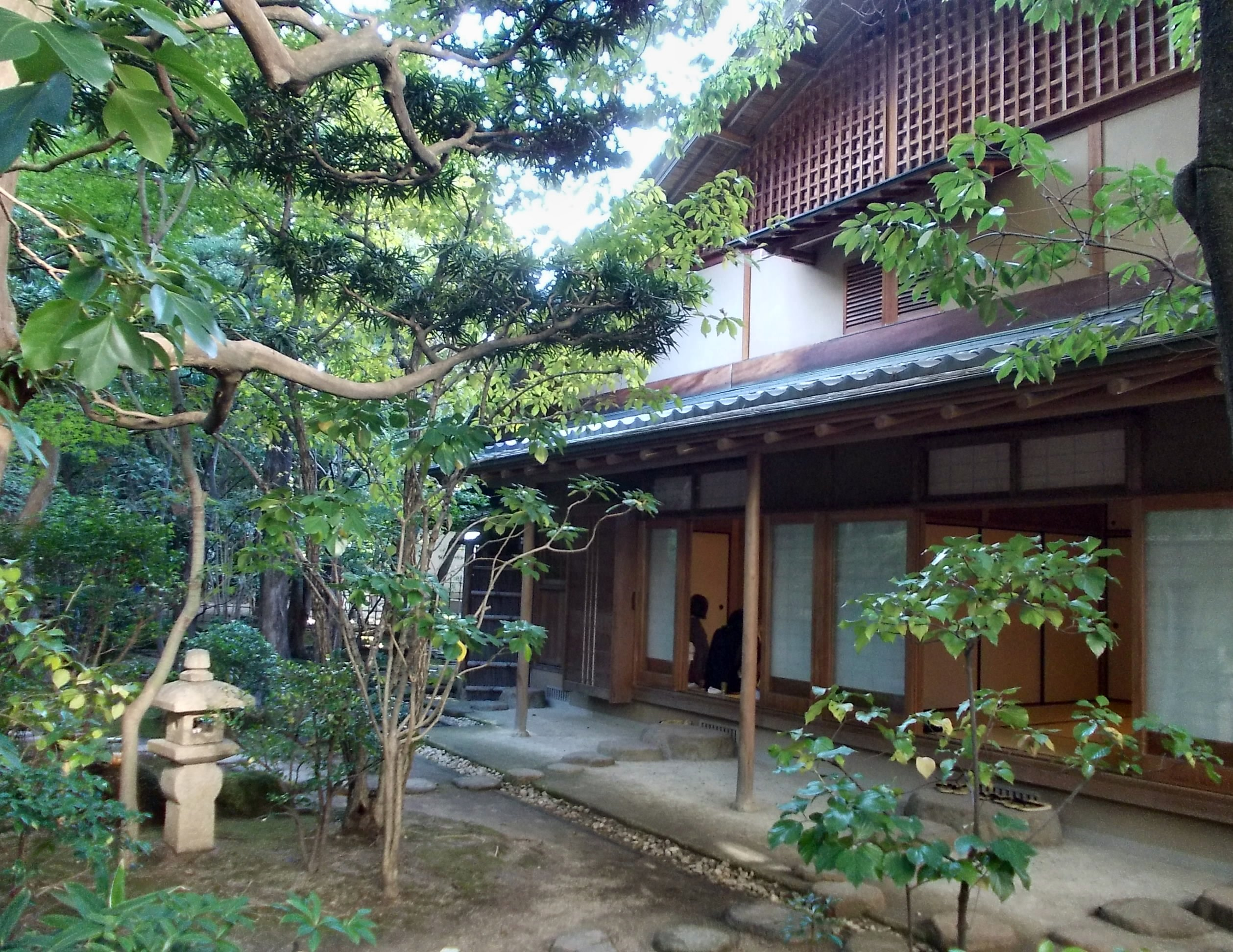
Rakusui-en's tea ceremony room

Rakusui-en (楽水園) is a garden in Hakata-ku, Fukuoka, Japan. It was originally built in 1906 for Shimozawa Zenemon Chikamasa, a Hakata merchant. In 1995, Fukuoka City overhauled the structure and reopened it as a Japanese garden where visitors can experience a tea ceremony; with four tea rooms (two of which are available for use by general visitors) it is often used for tea ceremonies and related training.

== See also ==
- Yūsentei Park
