= Hakata-ku =

Hakata 博多区
- Ward
- Hakata Ward
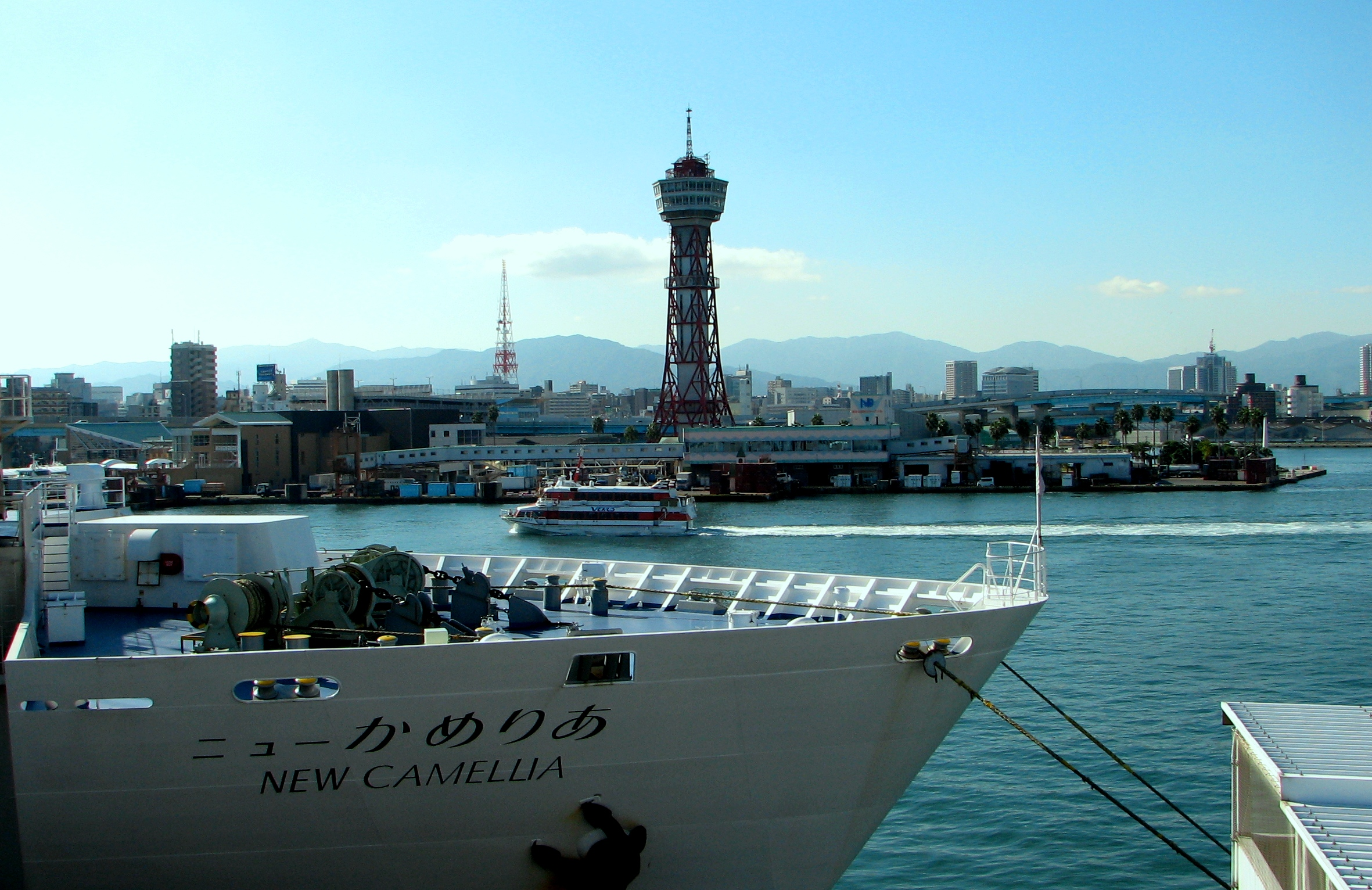
- Hakata Port

- Flag Seal

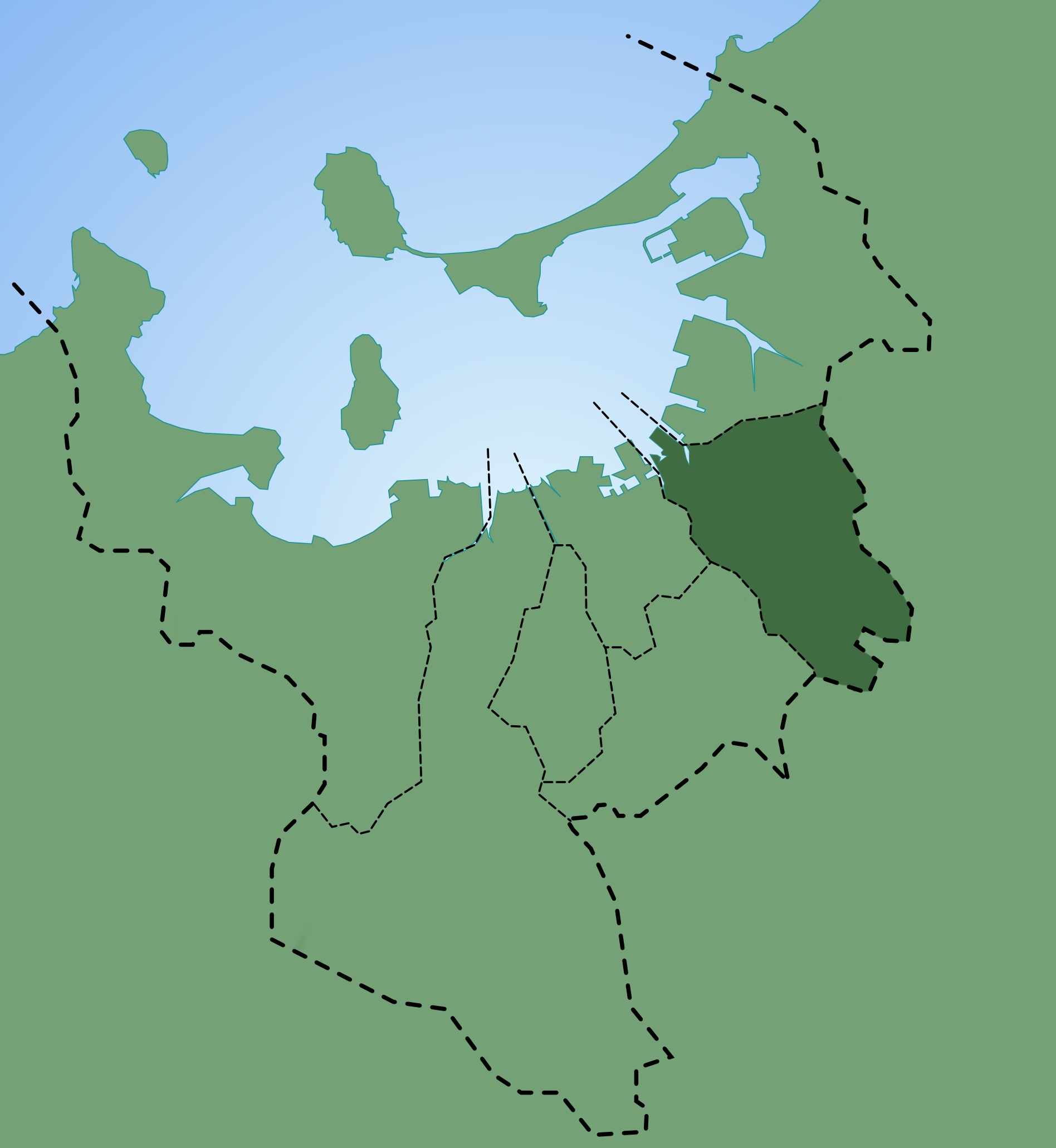
- Location of Hakata-ku in Fukuoka

- Coordinates: 33°35′29″N 130°24′53″E
- Country: Japan
- Region: Kyushu
- Prefecture: Fukuoka Prefecture
- City: Fukuoka

Area
  - Total: 31.47 km^{2} (12.15 sq mi)

Population (1 August 2026)
  - Total: 266,793
  - Density: 8,437/km^{2} (21,850/sq mi)
- Time zone: UTC+9 (Japan Standard Time)
- Phone number: 092-441-2131
- Address: 2-9-3 Hakata Ekimae, Hakata-ku Fukuoka-shi, Fukuoka-ken 812-8512

Hakata-ku (博多区) is a ward of the city of Fukuoka in Fukuoka Prefecture, Japan.

Many of Fukuoka Prefecture and Fukuoka City's principal government, commercial, retail, and entertainment establishments are located in the district. Hakata-ku is also the location of Fukuoka's main train station, Hakata Station, Fukuoka Airport, and the Hakata Port international passenger ship terminal.

== Geography ==
Hakata-ku is a ward of Fukuoka City located on its eastern edge. It covers an area of 31.47 km^{2} (12.15 sq mi) with a population of 266,793 as of 1 August 2026. Much of the ward consists of low-lying plains beside the Mikasa River (御笠川, Mikasagawa). The northwestern end of the ward faces Hakata Bay, which includes both ferry and international cruise ship terminals, Hakata Harbor (博多港, Hakata kō). The northeast end of the ward is slightly elevated and is named Higashihirao (東平尾), with nearby Fukuoka Airport. Around Hakata Station is downtown; Nakasu (中洲) is the main dining and entertainment district of the ward along the Naka River (那珂川, Nakagawa). Hakata-ku also houses the Fukuoka Prefectural Office.

== Economy ==
Many Japanese companies have established branch offices in Hakata-ku due to its ease of access to local government offices as well as transportation hubs such as Hakata Station and Fukuoka Airport. The headquarters of JR Kyūshū, Best Denki, and many other companies are in the ward.

Air Next, a subsidiary of All Nippon Airways, is headquartered on the grounds of Fukuoka Airport in Hakata-ku. Link Airs has its headquarters in the Fukuoka Gion Daiichi Seimei Building (福岡祇園第一生命ビル Fukuoka Gion Daiichi Seimei Biru) in Hakata-ku. Cisco has an Asia-Pacific sales office on the 12th floor of the Fukuoka Gion Daiichi Seimei Building.

Prior to its dissolution, Harlequin Air was headquartered on the grounds of the airport in Hakata-ku.

Hakata's economy was significantly transformed in 1996 with the opening of Canal City Hakata, an award-winning destination shopping and entertainment center.

=== Cruise ship tourism ===
From the early 2010s, Hakata became the beneficiary of significant growth in cruise ship tourism, particularly with visitors from China.

In 2014, 91 cruise ships travelled from China and called at Hakata. In 2015, 245 cruise ship calls were made at Hakata Port. After expansion and redevelopment of the port facilities, the number of cruise ship port calls in 2016 is expected to exceed 400. As of 2015, the largest passenger vessel making regular port calls at Hakata is Royal Caribbean International's MS Quantum of the Seas.

Partly as a result of growing international tourism, in 2015, Fukuoka reported the fastest rising tax revenues and population in Japan.

== History ==
Hakata is one of the oldest cities in Japan. In the Middle Ages, Hakata, which faces onto the Genkai-Nada Channel (玄界灘) dividing Japan from Korea, was a base for merchants who traded with China and Korea, and the city housed Japan's first Chinatown. Taira no Kiyomori is said to have built the artificial harbor Sode-no-minato (袖の湊) to increase commerce. Hakata was burned down by many wars, including the Mongol invasions.

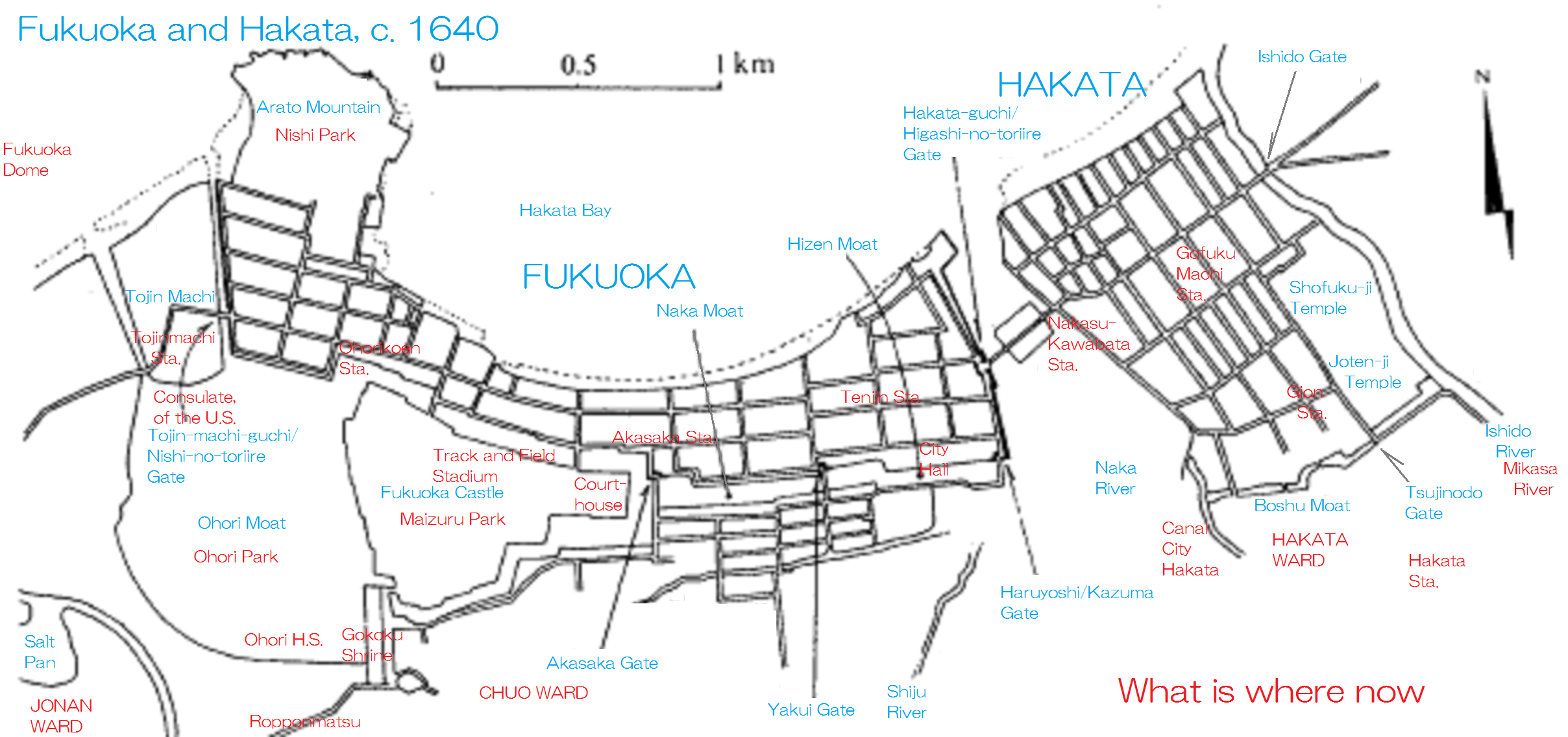
Fukuoka and Hakata, c.1640

In the early Edo period, Kuroda Nagamasa was appointed the lord of Chikuzen Province, and most of his samurai vassals lived in Fukusaki, on the opposite shore of the Naka River from Hakata. Kuroda Nagamasa changed the name of the area to Fukuoka after his hometown, Fukuoka in Okayama Prefecture. He ordered Tachibana Castle and Najima Castle dismantled, and had Fukuoka Castle built using the stones from those older castles. At that time, Hakata was no larger than one square kilometer, demarcated by defensive lines along the Naka River, the Boshu-bori (or Boshu Canal), and the Ishido or Mikasa River.

In 1876, Hakata (ja:博多), then also known as Dai-Ni-Dai-ku, and Fukuoka, or Dai-Ichi-Dai-ku, were merged. In 1878 the settlement was renamed Fukuoka-ku (福岡区) by the Fukuoka prefectural government, though the population of Hakata was 25,677 and that of Fukuoka was 20,410. At that time, the name Hakata vanished from the administration. In 1889, after a local referendum in which half the voters chose the name Fukuoka, and half chose Hakata, the city was officially renamed Fukuoka-shi, but at the same time, a new train station then being built was named Hakata Station.

An imperial decree issued in July 1899 established Hakata as an open port for trade with the United States and the United Kingdom.

In 1972, when Fukuoka City was granted designated status by government ordinance, a ward including the old Hakata area was given the name Hakata-ku.

In 2016, a large sinkhole appeared in the city center just west of Hakata station. The sinkhole was filled, and the affected roads were completely repaired within a few days. However, the hasty repair seems to have been problematic as less than a month later, the road began showing signs of imminent implosion.

== Culture ==
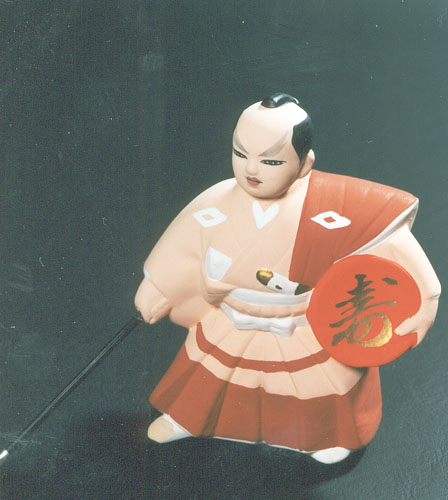
Hakata ningyō

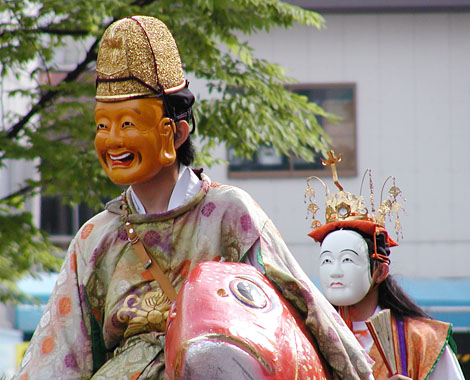
Hakata Dontaku.

Hakata was the traditional center for the manufacture of Hakata ningyō, which are traditional Japanese dolls that are famous throughout Japan. Today, almost all Hakata ningyō makers (Hakata ningyō shi) have their factories in the Old Hakata Area, a part of modern Hakata-ku.

Hakata-ori is a textile used for the obi of a kimono.

It is also the home of Mentai Rock, named after the popular mentaiko dish served in the region, that spawned numerous J-pop idols during the early 1980s. Neo Mentai Rock is the name given to a recent renewal in activity from local musicians.

Hakata-ben is the local Japanese dialect spoken in the Old Hakata Area.

Hakata is also the location of the pop group HKT48. Other popular groups from Hakata are Kanikapila and NUMBER GIRL.

Parts of the famous crime novel 'Points and lines' ('Ten to Sen' in Japanese) by the award-winning Japanese writer Seichō Matsumoto occur in Hakata and its train station.

The South Korean government maintains the Korea Education Institution (Korean: 후쿠오카 한국교육원; Japanese: 福岡韓国教育院) in Hakata-ku.

=== Famous foods ===
- Mentaiko
- Tonkotsu (pork bone) ramen, also called simply Hakata ramen
- Motsunabe
- Japanese cheesecake
- Mizutaki - Nabemono of chicken
- Hakata Torimon (ja:博多通りもん) - a type of cake
- Hakata no Hito - a type of cake

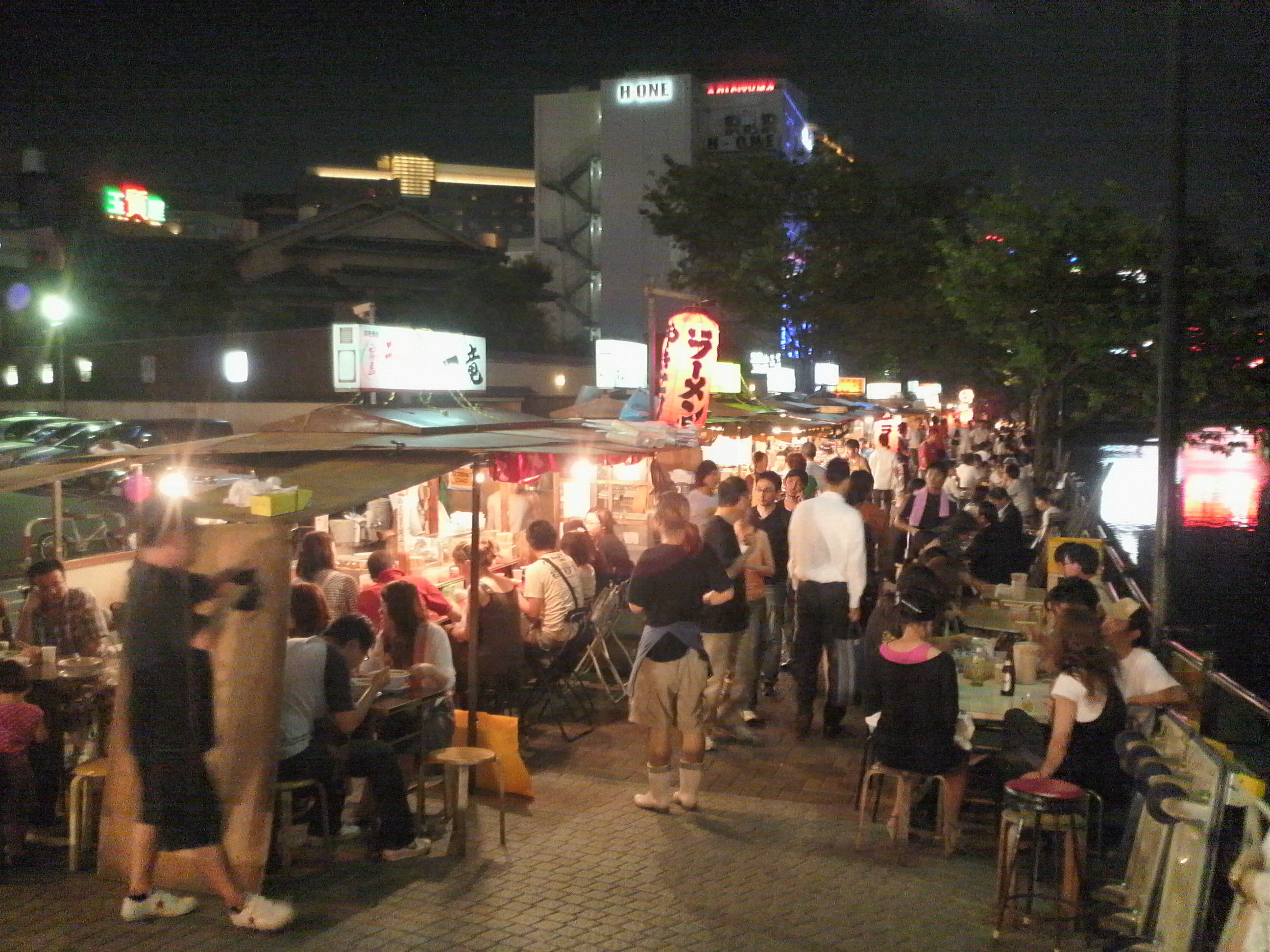
Food Yatai in Nakasu area

- Tsukemen (dipping noodles)

=== Festivals ===
- Hakata Dontaku Minato Matsuri - May 3 and 4
- Hakata Gion Yamakasa - from July 1 to 15
- Hakata O-kunchi - October 23 and 24 (prior to 1953, November 23)

== Transportation ==
=== Rail ===
- JR West
  - Sanyō Shinkansen
    - Hakata Station
- JR Kyūshū
  - Kyūshū Shinkansen
    - Hakata Station
  - Kagoshima Main Line
    - Yoshizuka Station - Hakata Station - Takeshita Station - Minami-Fukuoka Station
  - Sasaguri Line
    - Yoshizuka Station
- Nishi-Nippon Railroad
  - Tenjin Ōmuta Line
    - Zasshonokuma Station - Sakuranamiki Station
- Fukuoka City Subway
  - Airport Line
    - Nakasu-Kawabata Station - Gion Station - Hakata Station - Higashi-Hie Station - Fukuoka Airport Station
  - Hakozaki Line
    - Nakasu-Kawabata Station - Gofukumachi Station - Chiyo-Kenchōguchi Station

=== Bus ===
- Hakata bus terminus (see Nishitetsu)

=== Airport ===
- Fukuoka Airport

=== Harbor ===
- Bayside place Hakata Futoh (Hakata Pier)
- Chūō Wharf (Central Wharf) - international ferry Beetle and Kobee and New Camellia

== Facilities ==
=== Commerce ===
- Canal City Hakata
  - Grand Hyatt Fukuoka
- Hakata Riverain
  - Hakata-za
  - Hotel Ōkura Fukuoka

=== Culture ===
- Level-5 stadium (Hakata no mori Stadium)
- Fukuoka Convention Center - Marine Messe Fukuoka, Fukuoka International Congress Center, Fukuoka Kokusai Center
- Hakata Civic Center, Hakata Library
- Hakata South Library
- Nakasu
- Rakusui-en

=== Religion ===
- Shinto
  - Kushida Shrine
  - Sumiyoshi Shrine
  - Tōka Ebisu Shrine
- Buddhism
  - Shōfuku Temple
  - Tōchō Temple
  - Jōten Temple
  - Sōfuku Temple
- Christianity
  - Fukuoka Korean Christian Church, Chiyo
  - Hakata New Life Church
  - Hikarigaoka (Hill of light) Catholic Church
  - Minoshima Catholic Pastoral Center
  - Japan Evangelical Lutheran church, Sasaki machi
  - Japan Baptist Church, Aoki
  - North Kyushu Japanese Orthodox Church, Higashi-hirao
