= Zasshonokuma Station =

Railway station in Fukuoka, Japan

Zasshonokuma Station 雑餉隈駅
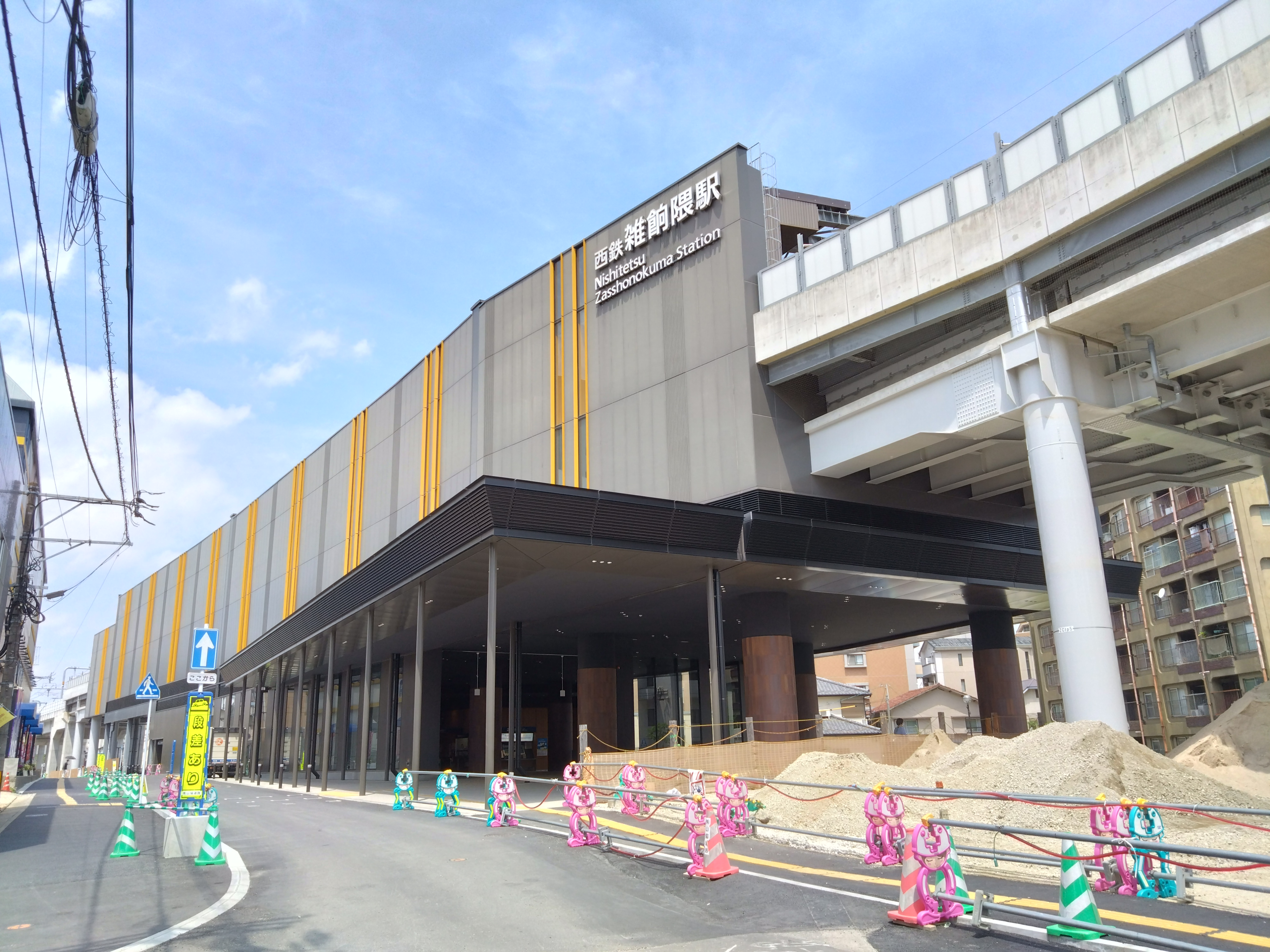
- Elevated station, May 2026

General information
- Location: Mugino 4-chōme, Hakata-ku, Fukuoka-shi, Fukuoka-ken; Japan
- Coordinates: 33°32′50″N 130°27′46″E
- Operator: Nishi-Nippon Railroad
- Line: ■ Tenjin Ōmuta Line
- Distance: 8.0 km from Nishitetsu Fukuoka (Tenjin) Station.
- Platforms: 2 side platforms
- Connections: Bus stop

Construction
- Structure type: Elevated
- Accessible: Yes

Other information
- Station code: T07
- Website: Official website

History
- Opened: 12 April 1924
- Former names: Zasshonokuma (to 1939); Kyutetsu Zasshonokuma (to 1942); Nishitetsu Zasshonokuma (to 1971)

Passengers
- FY2022: 14,203

Services
Preceding station	Nishitetsu	Following station
Ijiri towards Nishitetsu Fukuoka (Tenjin)	Tenjin Ōmuta Line Local	Sakuranamiki towards Ōmuta
Location
- Location within Fukuoka Prefecture Location within Japan

Zasshonokuma Station (雑餉隈駅, Zasshonokuma-eki) is a passenger railway station located in Hakata-ku, Fukuoka Fukuoka Prefecture, Japan. It is operated by the private transportation company Nishi-Nippon Railroad (NNR), and has station number T07.

== Lines ==
The station is served by the Nishitetsu Tenjin Ōmuta Line and is 8.0 kilometers from the starting point of the line at Nishitetsu Fukuoka (Tenjin) Station.

== Station layout ==
The station consists of two elevated opposed side platforms with the station building underneath.

== Platforms ==
1	■ Tenjin Ōmuta Line	for Futsukaichi, Kurume and Ōmuta
2	■ Tenjin Ōmuta Line	for Fukuoka

== History ==
The station was opened on 12 April 1924. Its name was changed to Kyutetsu Zasshonokuma Station on 1 July 1939, and to Nishitetsu Zasshonokuma Station on 22 September 1942. It reverted to its original name on 1 March 1971.

On 28 August 2022, the facilities were moved to a new elevated station as part of a grade separation project.

== Passenger statistics ==
In fiscal 2022, the station was used by 14,203 passengers daily.

== Surrounding area ==
- Minami-Fukuoka Station - Kyushu Railway Company (JR Kyushu) Kagoshima Main Line
- Toka Ebisu Shrine

== See also ==
- List of railway stations in Japan
