= Higashi-Hie Station =

Metro station in Fukuoka, Japan

Coordinates: 33.5897°N 130.4310°E

K12 Higashi-Hie Station 東比恵駅
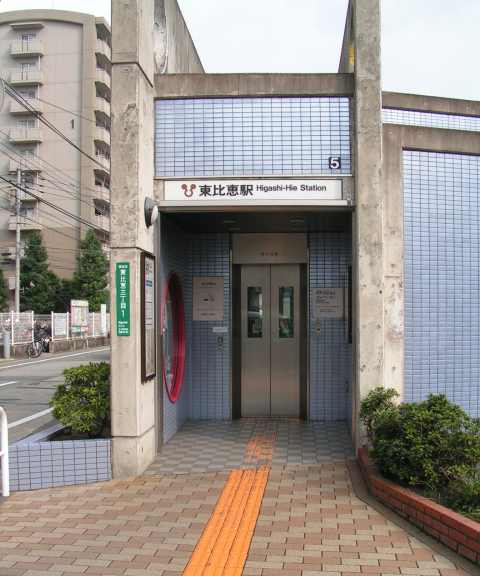
- Entrance No.5

General information
- Location: Hakata, Fukuoka, Fukuoka; Japan
- System: Fukuoka City Subway station
- Operator: Fukuoka City Subway
- Line: Airport Line

Other information
- Station code: K12

History
- Opened: 3 March 1993; 33 years ago

Passengers
- 2006: 6,873 daily

Services
| Preceding station | Fukuoka City Subway | Following station |
|---|---|---|
| Hakata K11 towards Meinohama | Airport Line | Fukuoka Airport K13 Terminus |
Location

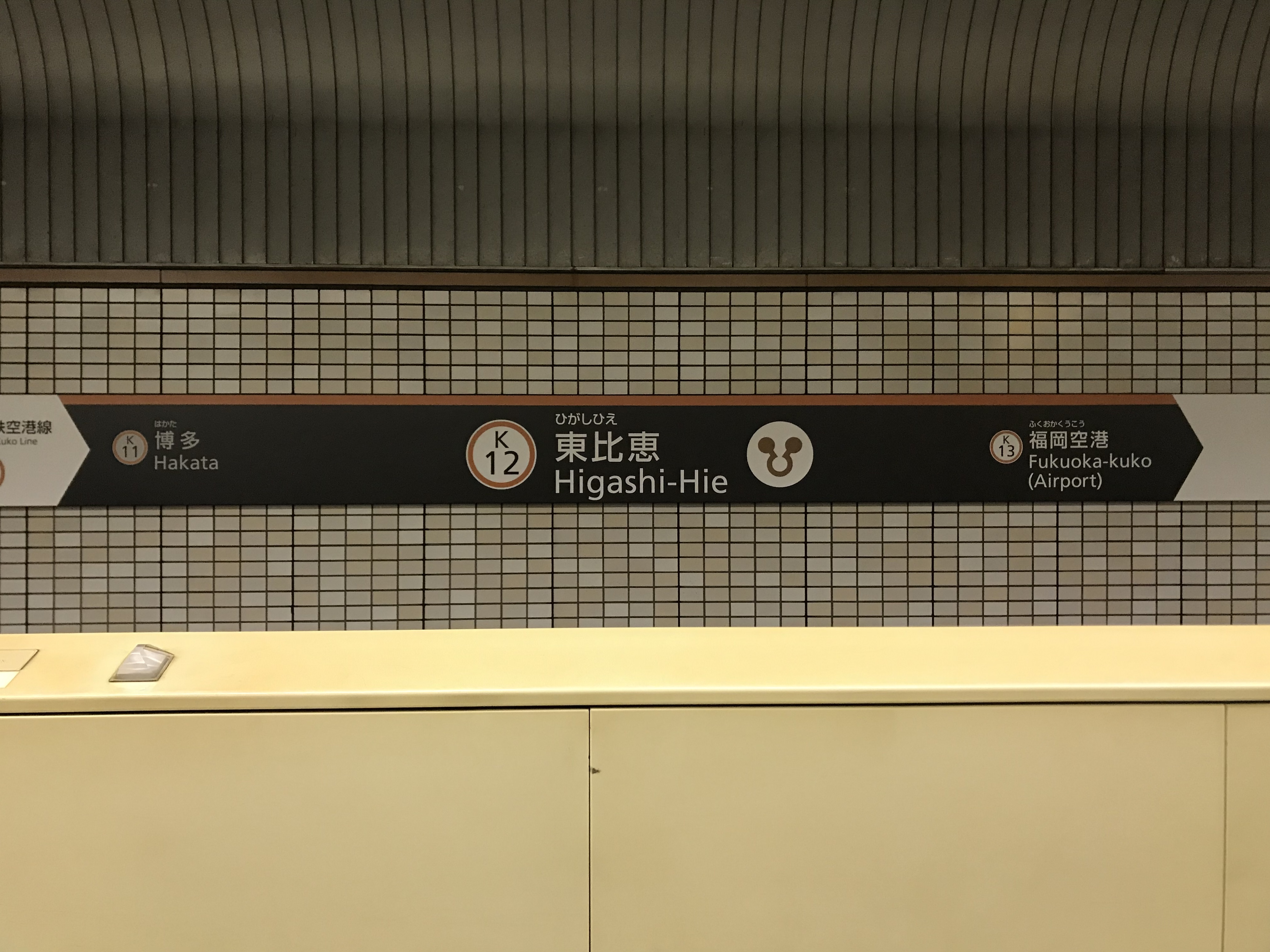
Station sign, November 2018

Higashi-Hie Station (東比恵駅, Higashi-Hie-eki) is a train station located in Hakata-ku, Fukuoka in Japan. The station's symbol mark is Hie's initials "ひ" looking like earthenware because Hie remains, and each edge of the character mean Hakata and the Airport.

== Lines ==
- Fukuoka City Subway
  - Airport Line

== Platforms ==
| 1 | ■ Kūkō Line | for Fukuoka Airport |
| 2 | ■ Kūkō Line | for Hakata, Tenjin, Meinohama, Chikuzen-Maebaru and Karatsu |

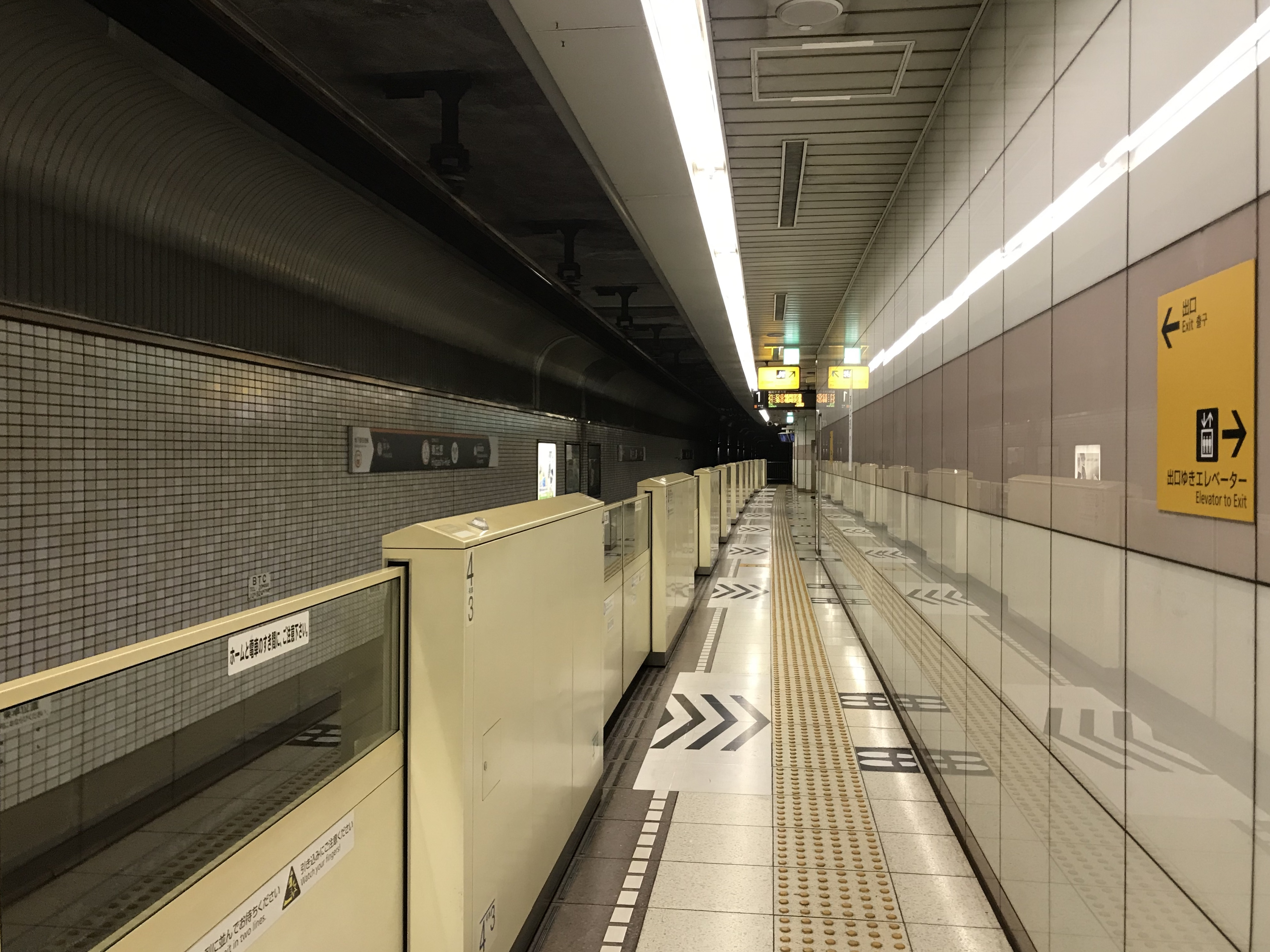
Platform

== Vicinity ==
- Several schools
- Hakata Civic Center
- Hakata Social Insurance Office
- Sanno Park
