= Minami-ku, Fukuoka =

Coordinates: 33°33′42″N 130°25′36″E

Minami 南区
- Ward
- Minami Ward
- Flag Seal

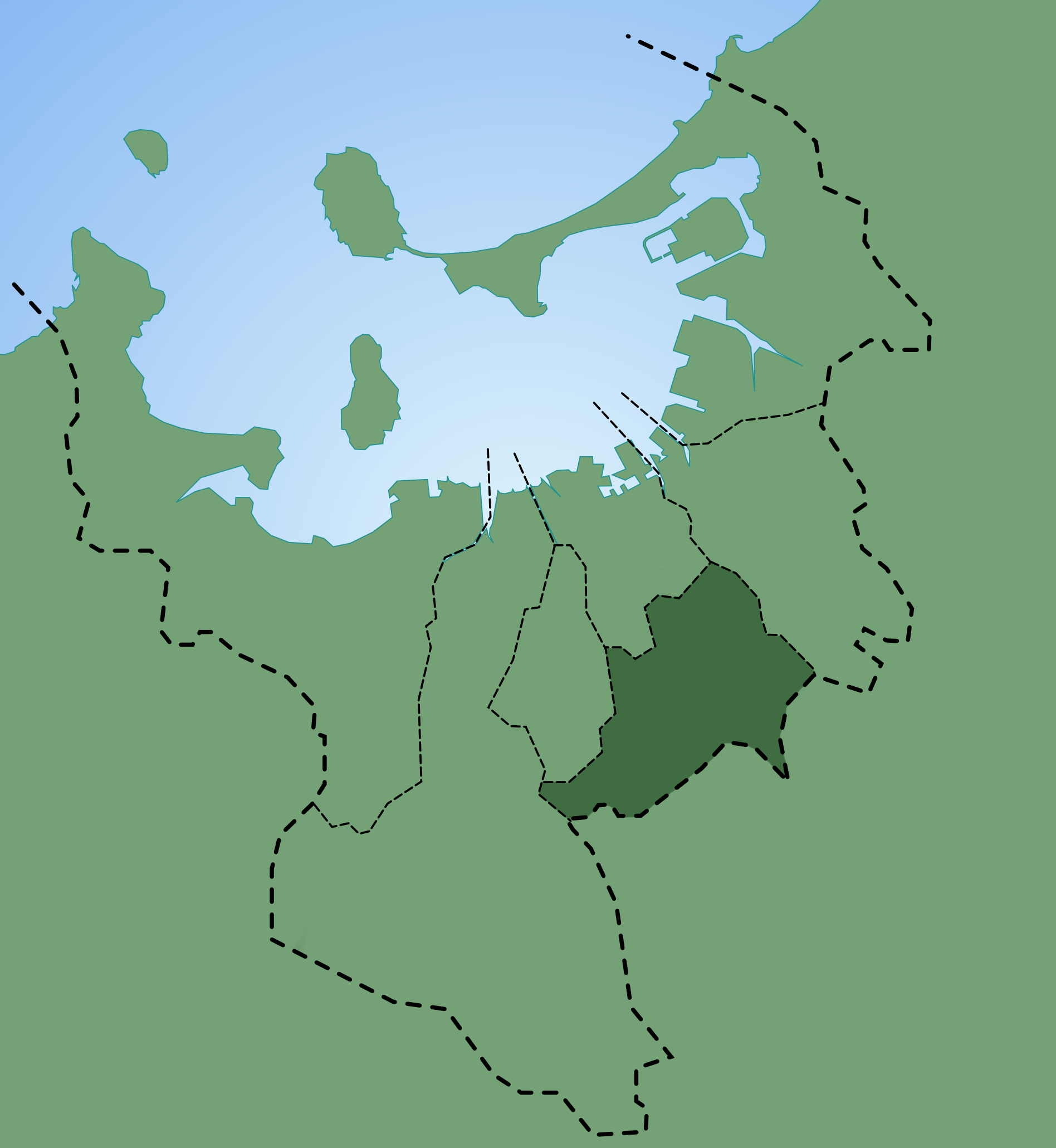
- Location of Minami Ward in Fukuoka

- Country: Japan
- Region: Kyushu
- Prefecture: Fukuoka
- City: Fukuoka
- Time zone: UTC+9 (Japan Standard Time)

Minami-ku (南区) is one of the seven wards of Fukuoka City, Japan. As of 2004, it had a population of 247,913 people and an area of 30.98 km^{2}. As of 2016, the population had increased to 255,000 people with 8,200 per km2. Its name literally means "south ward." It is bordered by the central, Hakata, Jonan, and Sawara wards of Fukuoka city, and also by the cities of Nakagawa and Kasuga. Sasabaru Station within the ward is on the JR Kagoshima main line. It also has three stations on the Tenjin Ōmuta Line.
