= Sasabaru Station =

Railway station in Fukuoka, Japan

JB 02 Sasabaru Station 笹原駅
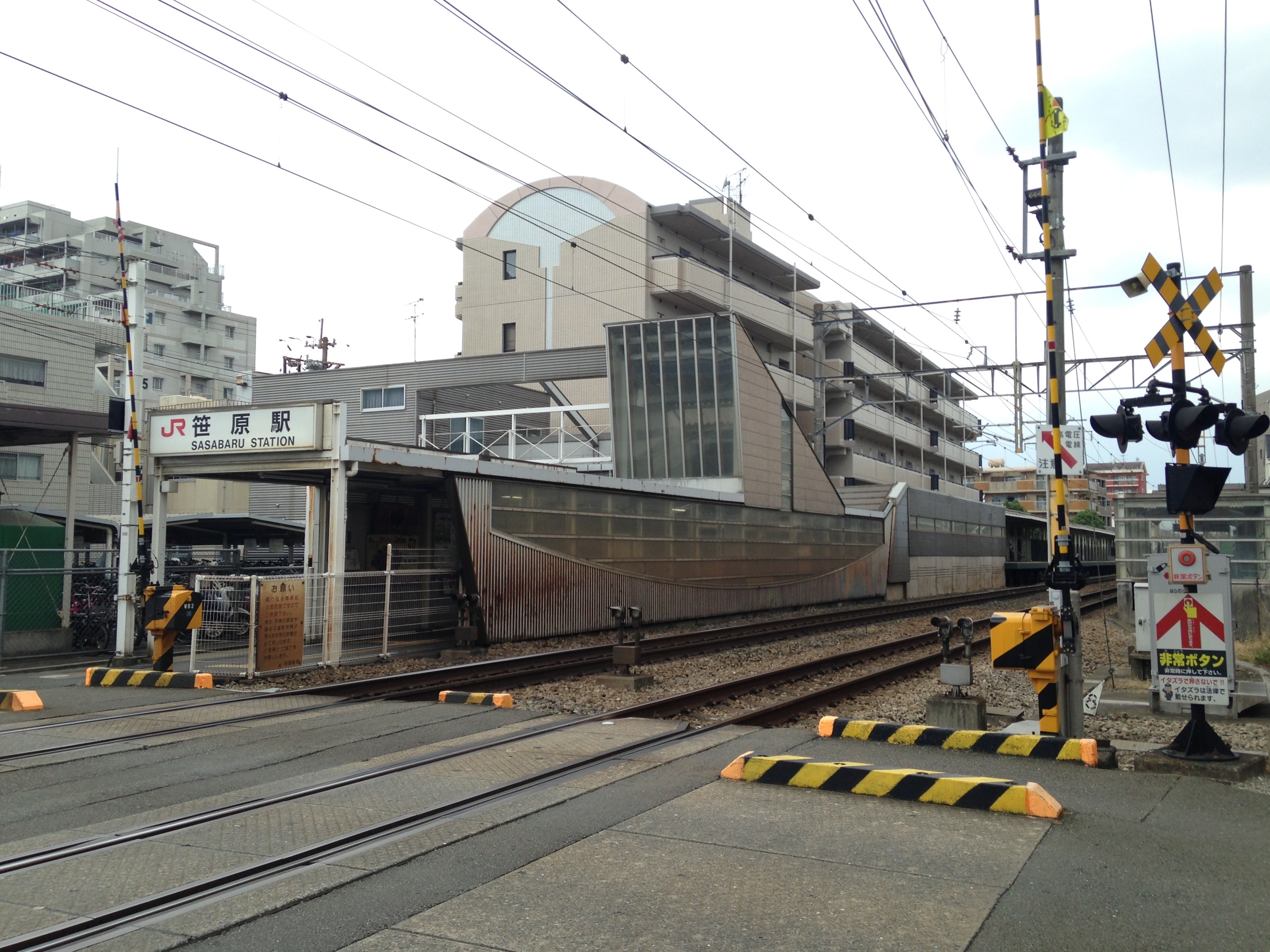
- Sasabaru Station in 2016

General information
- Location: 17, Ijiri 3-chōme, Minami-ku, Fukuoka-shi, Fukuoka-ken; Japan
- Coordinates: 33°33′12″N 130°26′55″E
- Operator: JR Kyushu
- Line: JB Kagoshima Main Line
- Distance: 83.3 km from Mojikō
- Platforms: 2 side platforms
- Tracks: 2 tracks

Construction
- Structure type: At grade

Other information
- Status: Staffed
- Website: Official website

History
- Opened: 9 March 1987

Passengers
- FY2020: 4449 daily
- Rank: 33rd (among JR Kyushu stations)

Services
Preceding station	JR Kyushu	Following station
Minami-Fukuoka towards Kagoshima	Kagoshima Main Line Local	Takeshita towards Mojikō
Location
- Location within Fukuoka Prefecture Location within Japan

Sasabaru Station (笹原駅, Sasabaru-eki) is a passenger railway station located in Minami-ku, Fukuoka City, Fukuoka Prefecture, Japan. It is operated by JR Kyushu.

== Lines ==
The station is served by the Kagoshima Main Line and is located 83.3 km from the starting point of the line at Mojikō.

== Layout ==
The station consists of two side platforms serving two tracks. The platforms are connected by an underground passage, and ticket gates are located at both the east and west exits. The station is staffed.

=== Platforms ===
1	■ JB Kagoshima Main Line	for Hakata, Akama and Kokura
2	■ JB Kagoshima Main Line	for Tosu, Kurume and Ōmuta

== History ==
The station was opened by Japanese National Railways (JNR) on 3 March 1987 as a temporary stop on the existing Kagoshima Main Line track. Shortly thereafter, with the privatization of JNR on 1 April 1987, JR Kyushu took over control and upgraded it to a full station.

== Passenger statistics ==
In fiscal 2020, the station was used by an average of 4449 passengers daily (boarding passengers only), and it ranked 33rd among the busiest stations of JR Kyushu.

== Surrounding area ==
It is located in the southern part of Fukuoka City. The Kagoshima Main Line and Nishitetsu Tenjin Ōmuta Line intersect approximately 600m south of this station.

- Fukuoka City Mitsuki Elementary School
- Fukuoka City Mitsuki Junior High School

== See also ==
- List of railway stations in Japan
