= Hakata Dontaku =

Annual festival in Fukuoka, Japan

- Observed by: Fukuoka
- Begins: 3 May
- Ends: 4 May
- Date: May

The Hakata Dontaku (博多どんたく) is a traditional festival held annually in Fukuoka, Japan, with more than 840 years of history. It has become an important part of the lives of Fukuoka's citizens and is one of the three major festivals in Fukuoka. Following the opening night event of 2 May, a 1.2 km stretch of Meiji-dori, one of Fukuoka's busiest thoroughfares, is closed to vehicles and transformed into "Dontaku Street".

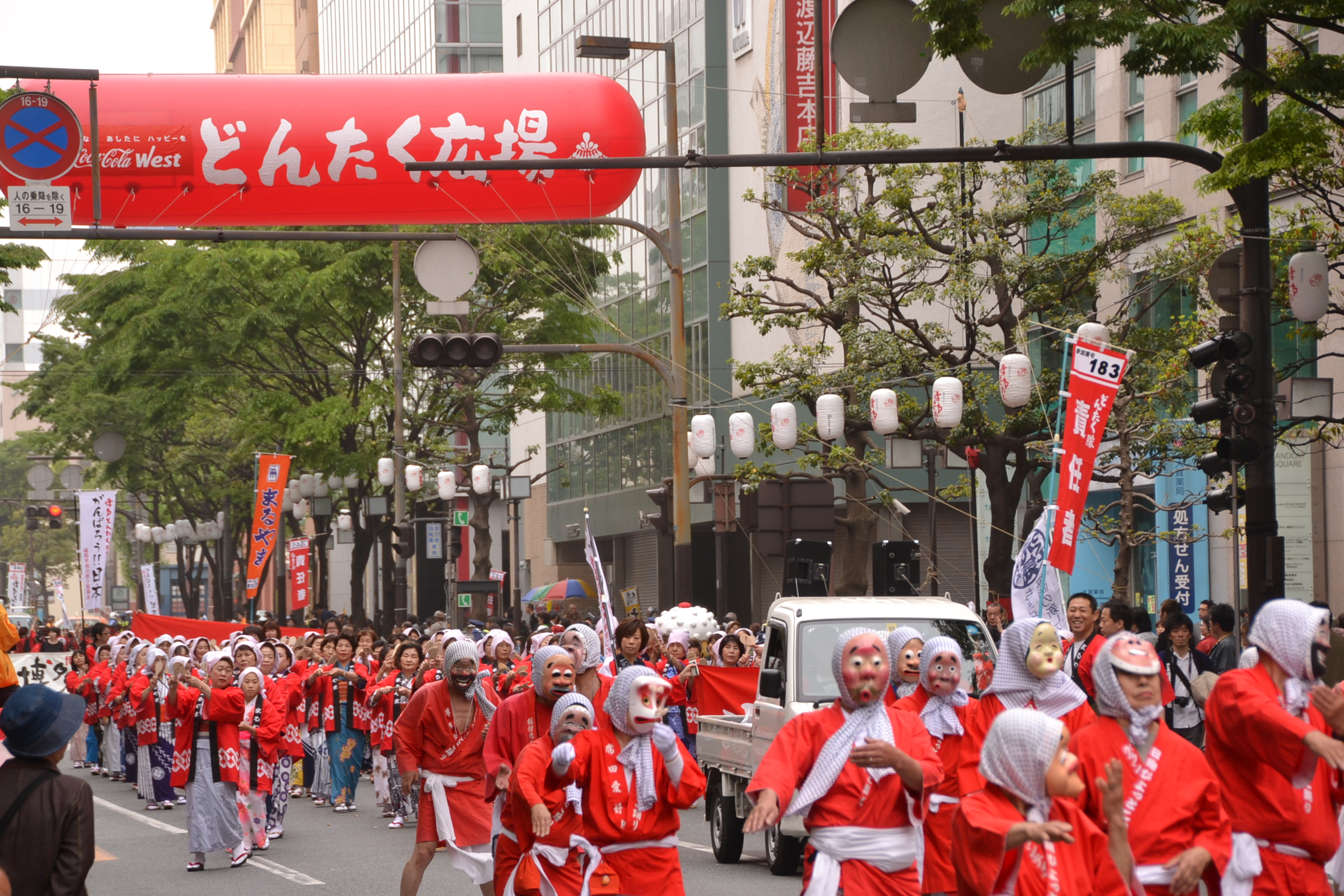
Hakata Dontaku Parade

== Overview ==
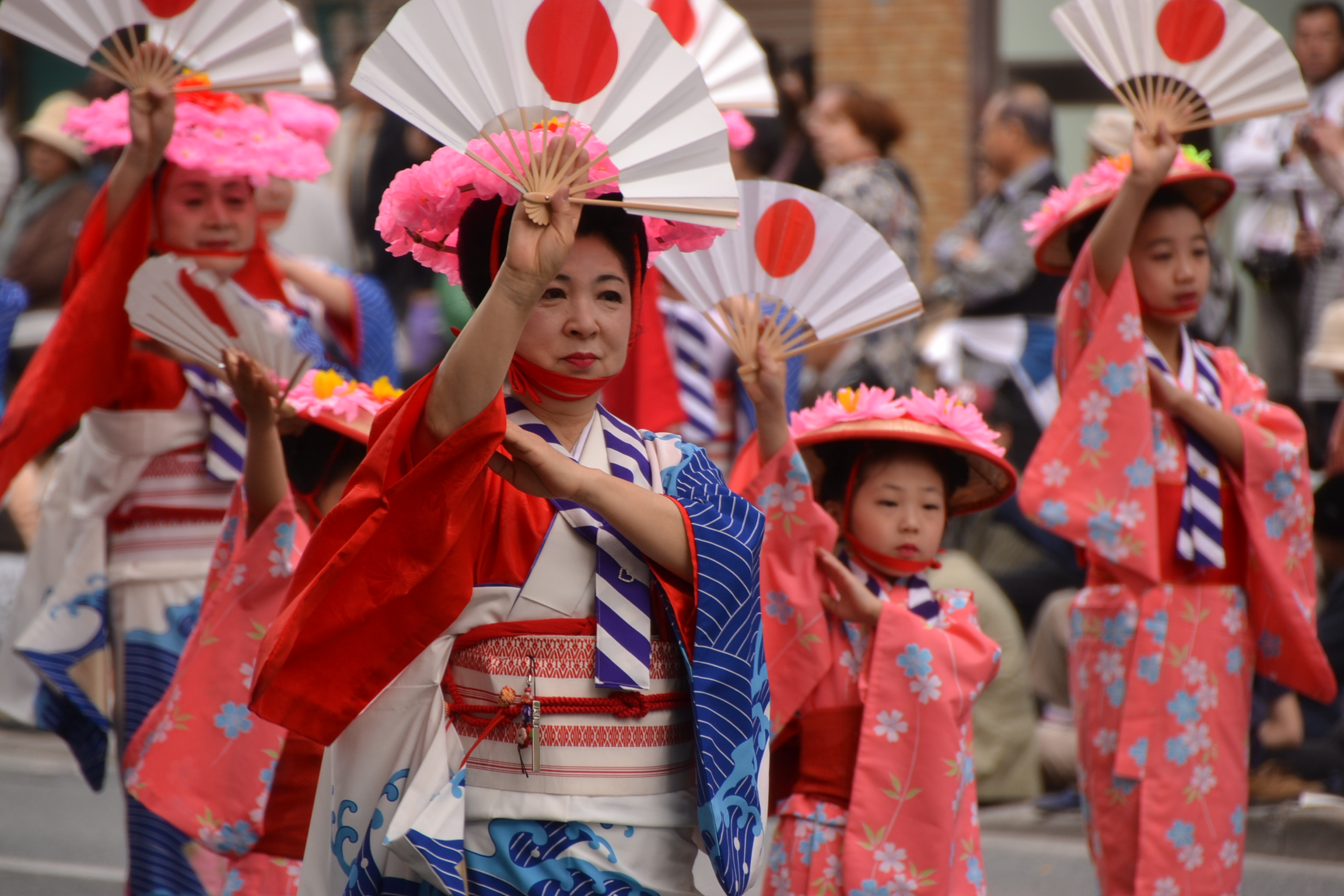
Hakata Dontaku Parade

The Hakata Dontaku is an annual festival that has been held since 1962 during Golden Week, from 3 to 4 May, in Fukuoka, Japan.

A typical festival features over 650 groups, including 33,000 individual performers, and draws an audience of over 2 million people during the two days. Along with Takada-jō Hyakuman'nin Kan'oukai in Jōetsu, Niigata, Hirosaki Sakura Festival in Hirosaki, Aomori, and Hiroshima Flower Festival in Hiroshima, Hakata Dontaku is also one of the most famous and biggest festivals in Japan. Moreover, it is also one of the biggest three festivals in Fukuoka (along with Hakata Gion Yamakasa and Hōjōya).

The festival is hosted by the Fukuoka Chamber of Commerce and Fukuoka Tourism Association, and draws both local residents and domestic and international tourists.

== History ==
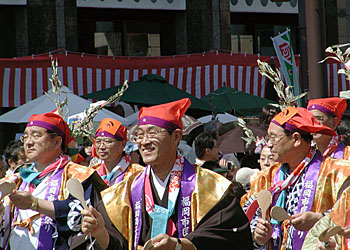
Matsubayashi

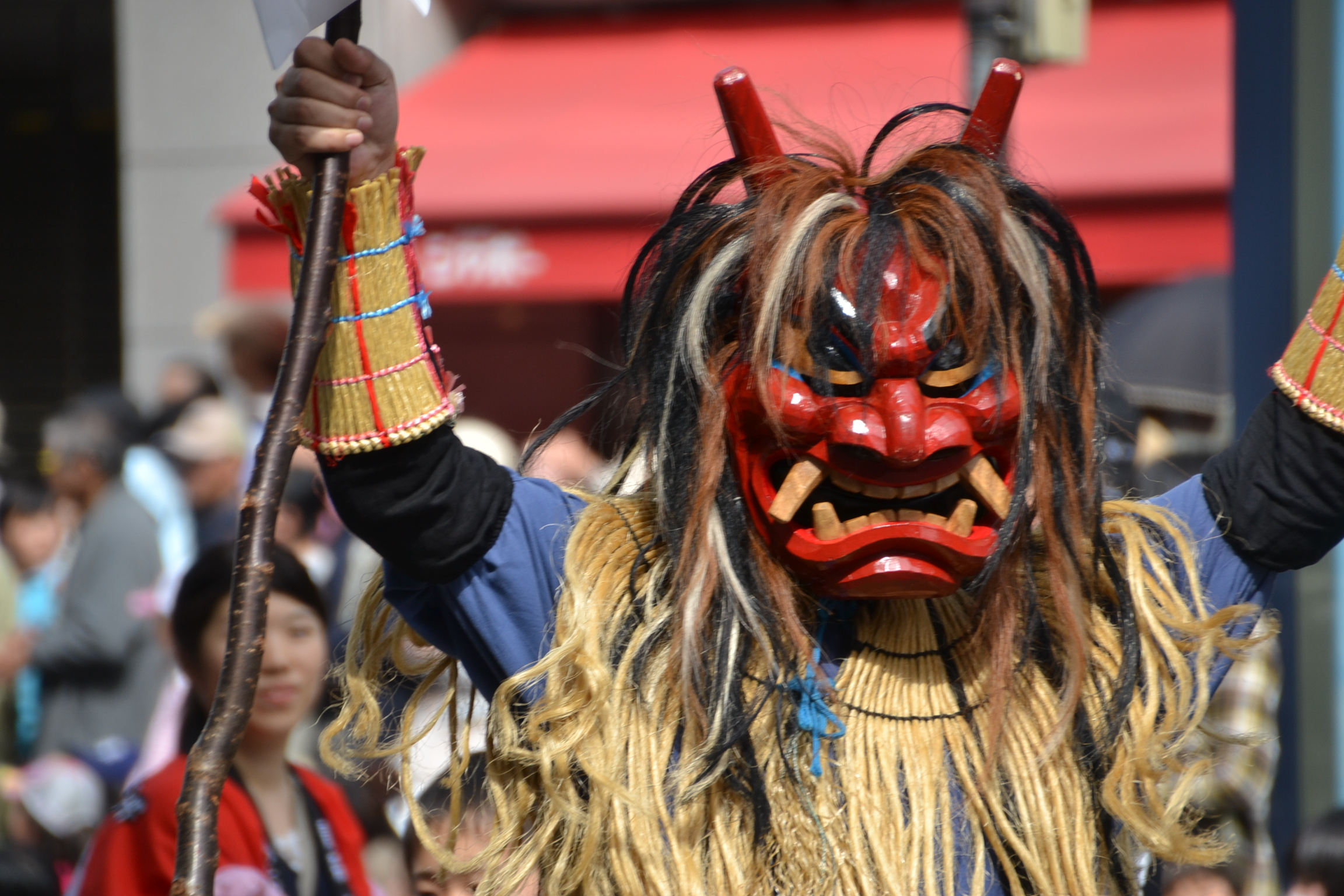
3 God of fortune

The origins of Hakata Dontaku (博多どんたく) can be traced back to the traditional celebration known as Hakata Matsubayashi (博多松囃子). This event, believed to have emerged during the Muromachi period (1336–1573), was originally a New Year’s ritual intended to welcome deities who bring good fortune in the coming year.

Matsubayashi (松囃子) is thought to have originated in Kyoto, where groups of performers would visit the residences of feudal lords to present dances and music. The tradition eventually spread throughout Japan, reaching Hakata in Kyushu. Hakata Matsubayashi is said to have begun in 1179, making it a tradition with over 840 years of history. One theory attributes its origin to the local people's wish to honor Taira no Shigemori (平重盛), a prominent military figure active during the Heiji Rebellion (平治の乱), by organizing commemorative festivities following his death. However, there are also alternative legends regarding its inception.

During the Edo period (1603–1868), Hakata Matsubayashi evolved into a formal procession in which many samurai visited Fukuoka Castle (福岡城), the seat of the Fukuoka Domain (福岡藩), during the New Year to pay their respects. As the domain represented the highest authority among local warriors, this act held significant ceremonial value.

The procession, known as Tōrimon (通り門), was dedicated to three deities of good fortune. Following their visit to the domain, participants paraded through the city, paying respects at shrines, temples, and the residences of prominent citizens. This event became a vibrant community festival, with citizens joining the parade and performing traditional dances.

In 1872 (Meiji 5), the government temporarily banned the festival due to financial concerns. Nevertheless, the people of Fukuoka maintained their deep cultural attachment to the event, leading to its revival in 1879 (Meiji 12) under the new name Hakata Dontaku. Along with the change in name, the timing and structure of the festival were also revised, and it ceased to be a New Year’s celebration. It gradually transformed into a broader festival featuring various performances and parades.

The festival was suspended again in 1941 due to wartime restrictions. After World War II, Hakata Dontaku resumed in 1946 and was held on May 24 of that year. Since 1949, it has been held annually on May 3 and 4.

1179	Hakata Matsubayashi started
1872	Banned Matsubayashi
1879	Beginning of Dontaku
1941	Because of war, the festival had been cancelled
1946	After the war, Dontaku re-started
1949	As promulgating a constitution, festival schedule will always be 3 and 4 May
1962	Dontake is recognized as festival of Fukuoka citizens
2011	It's been 50 years since this became festival of Fukuoka citizens

== Event schedule ==
=== 2 May ===
Hakata Dontaku is a 2 days event but there will be an opening night event night before the festival starting from 4:30 PM until 8:30 PM on 2 May. A group called "Dontaku Tai" will be performing and also people decide the Miss Fukuoka at that night as well. This show will be on RKB Mainichi Broadcastingso that people can enjoy watching this performances on TV. In order to come and see the show people need to have an entrance ticket which will be handed out 2 weeks before the event and free.

=== 3 May ===
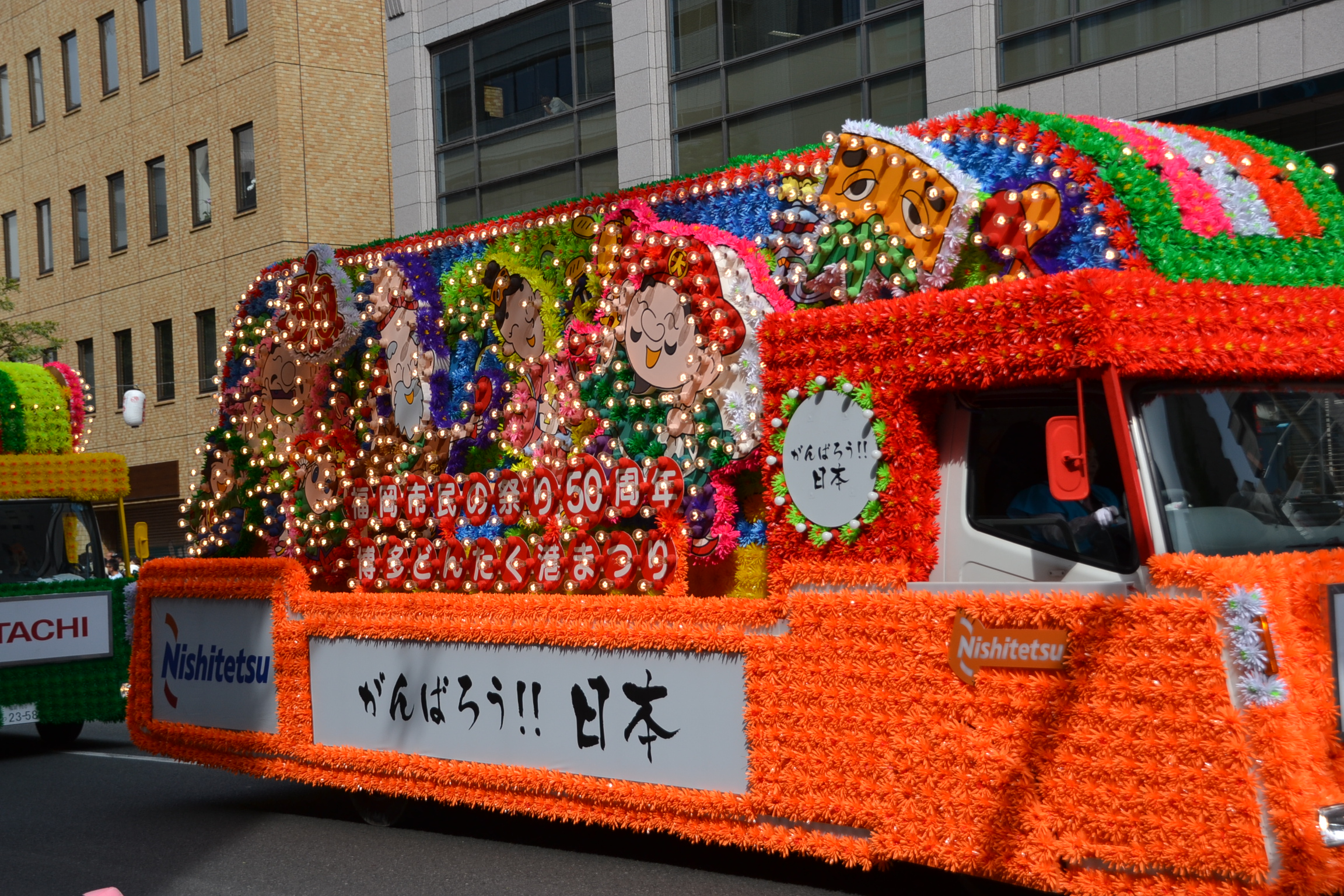
Hana Jidosha

The first day of Hakata Dontaku. Festival will be starting with origins of Dontaku, Matsubayashi parade. 3 Gods of fortune ride horses and walk around the city of Fukuoka as original Matsubayashi did in the history.

Thousands of performers will be dancing and walking down the street called "Meiji street." People wear various costumes and clap with rice scoping spoons, play instruments, wear masks and so on. Streets will be full of people both performer and audiences. Beside, Hana Jidosha which is cars that are decorated with lights and flowers are also essential part of this event.

=== 4 May ===
The second day of Hakata Dontaku. Schedule will be nearly the same as the first day. There will be Hakata Matsubayashi, Parade and Hana Jidosha. Since this is the last day, there will be a finale that everyone gather and dance to enjoy the last moment of the festival.
