= Minami-Fukuoka Station =

Railway station in Fukuoka, Japan

JB 03 Minami-Fukuoka Station 南福岡駅
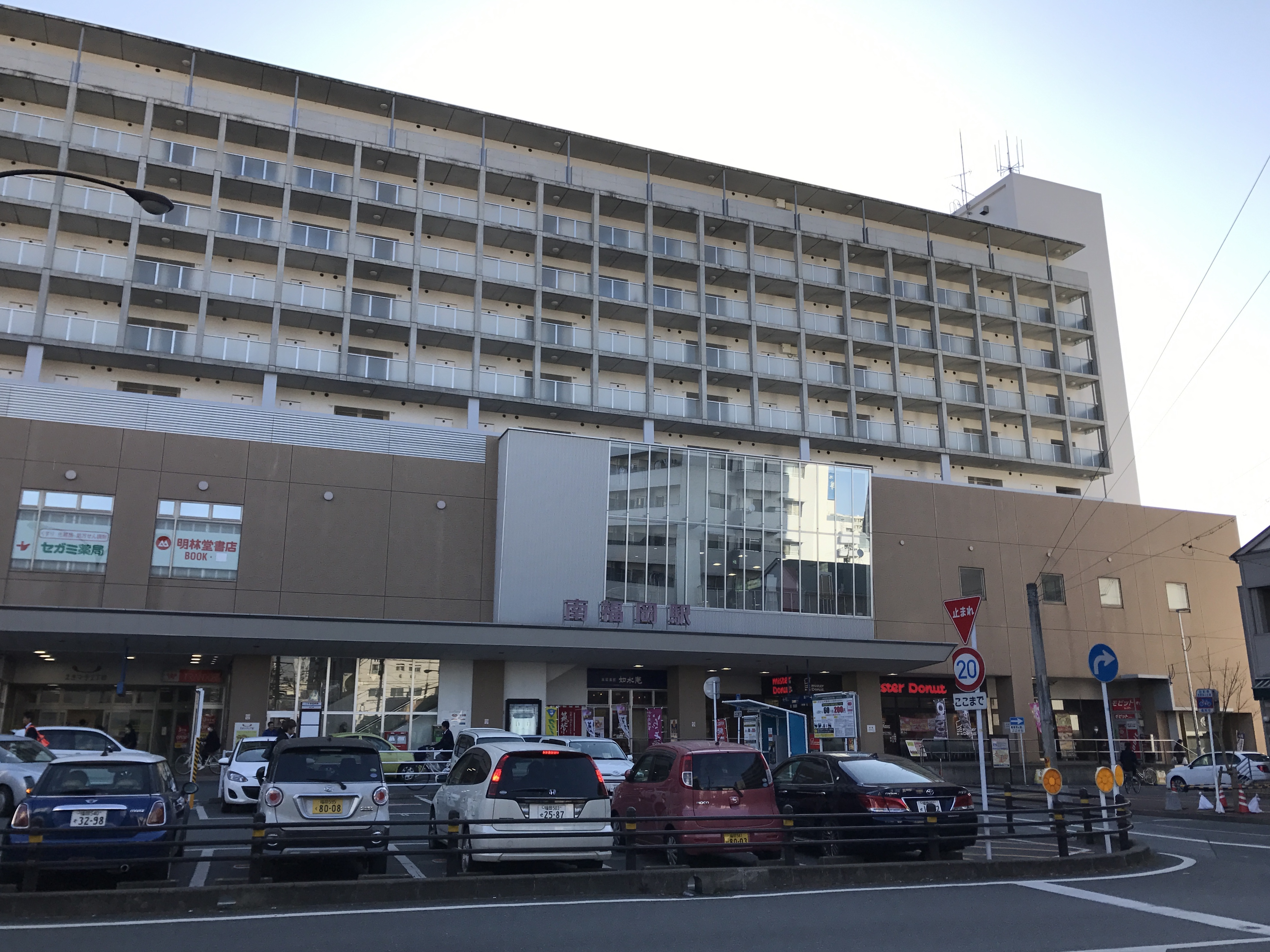
- Minami-Fukuoka Station in 2017

General information
- Location: 2-chōme-9 Kotobukimachi, Hakata-ku, Fukuoka-shi, Fukuoka-ken, 812-0884; Japan
- Coordinates: 33°32′33″N 130°27′33″E
- Operator: JR Kyushu
- Line: JB Kagoshima Main Line
- Distance: 84.9 km from Mojikō
- Platforms: 1 side + 2 island platforms
- Tracks: 5

Construction
- Structure type: At grade

Other information
- Status: Staffed (Midori no Madoguchi )
- Website: Official website

History
- Opened: 11 December 1889
- Former names: Zasshonokuma (until 1966)

Passengers
- FY2020: 8013 daily
- Rank: 13th (among JR Kyushu stations)

Services
Preceding station	JR Kyushu	Following station
Kasuga towards Kagoshima	Kagoshima Main Line Local	Sasabaru towards Mojikō
Location
- Location within Fukuoka Prefecture Location within Japan

Minami-Fukuoka Station (南福岡駅) is a passenger railway station located in Hakata-ku, Fukuoka City, Fukuoka Prefecture, Japan. It is operated by JR Kyushu.

== Lines ==
The station is served by the Kagoshima Main Line and is located 84.9 km from the starting point of the line at Mojikō.

== Layout ==
The station consists of one side platform and two island platforms serving five tracks, with a nine-story steel-framed reinforced concrete station building on the east side containing shops on the 1st to 2nd floors and rental apartments on the 3rd to 9th floors, and the ticket gates on the 2nd floor. The station has a Midori no Madoguchi staffed ticket office. The station is adjacent to the Minami-Fukuoka Rail Depot, the largest in the JR Kyushu area.

=== Platforms ===
1	■ JB Kagoshima Main Line	for Futsukaichi, Kurume and Ōmuta
2	■ JB Kagoshima Main Line	for Futsukaichi, Kurume and Ōmuta
3	■ JB Kagoshima Main Line	for Hakata, Akama and Kokura
4	■ JB Kagoshima Main Line	for Hakata, Akama and Kokura
5	■ JB Kagoshima Main Line	for Hakata, Akama and Kokura

== History ==
- 11 December 1889: The station was opened as Zasshonokuma Station (雑餉隈駅) by the privately run Kyushu Railway during the first phase of its network construction when a track was laid between Hakata and Tosu.
- 1 July 1907: Kyushu Railways is nationalized. Japanese Government Railways (JGR) took over the control of the station.
- 12 October 1909: The station became part of the Hitoyoshi Main Line.
- 21 November 1909: The station became part of the Kagoshima Main Line.
- 15 October 1919: Double-track line between Hakata and Futsukaichi laid down.
- 14 October 1960: Minami-Fukuoka train yard opened.
- 1 June 1961: Line is electrified between Kurume and Mojikō, including this station.
- 1 November 1966: Station renamed Minami-Fukuoka Station. This was due to users complaining that a nearby station on the Tenjin Ōmuta Line bore the same name.
- 1 April 1987: Privatization of Japanese National Railways (JNR), the successor to JGR Line. Control of the station passed to JR Kyushu.
- 1994: Station burned down in arson attack.
- July 1999: Station rebuilt with automatic ticket gates.
- 2006: Elevators added to platforms.

== Passenger statistics ==
In fiscal 2020, the station was used by an average of 8013 passengers daily (boarding passengers only), and it ranked 13th among the busiest stations of JR Kyushu.

== Surrounding area ==
- JR Kyūshū train yard
- Zasshonokuma : Tenjin Ōmuta Line
- NTT Building
- Japan Ground Self-Defense Force, Camp Fukuoka (4th Division Headquarter)
- Nakoku no okarekishi Park
- Nishitetsu Bus station

== See also ==
- List of railway stations in Japan
