= 2006 Fukuoka mayoral election =

The city of Fukuoka, Fukuoka Prefecture, Japan held a mayoral election on November 19, 2006. Hiroshi Yoshida, nominated by the DPJ and the SDP won over incumbent Hirotaro Yamasaki, backed by LDP

Mayoral election 2006: Fukuoka
Party	Candidate	Votes	%	±%
DPJ, SDP	Hiroshi Yoshida	177,400		
LDP	Hirotaro Yamasaki	157,868		
Independent	Hiromi Takayama (高山 博光)	55,603		
JCP	Toshiko Shimizu (清水 とし子)	42,296		
Independent	Keishi Yamaguchi (山口 敬之)	13,436		
Independent	Mitsuhiko Ueda (上田 光彦)	10,759		
Turnout			42.57	10.11

== Sources ==
- Japan Election coverage
