= Port Tower =

A Port Tower is a control tower structure used by a port authority found at seaports. It may also refer to:

- Chiba Port Tower
- Hakata Port Tower
- Kobe Port Tower
- Port Tower Complex
