= Asian Pacific Children's Convention =

Japanese non-profit organization

- Founded: November 1988
- Purpose: Peace & Co-existence
- Location: 1-10-1-5F Tenjin, Chuo-ku, Fukuoka 810-0001, Japan
- Coordinates: 33.590988°N 130.401033°E
- Region served: Asia-Pacific region
- Website: www.apcc.gr.jp

Asian Pacific Children's Convention (APCC Japanese: アジア太平洋こども会議・イン福岡) in Fukuoka, Japan, is a non-profit making organization which promotes peace and co-existence throughout the world under the theme "We are the BRIDGE: We connect dreams around the world".

The organization's main event is the annual convention where over 300 children from Asia Pacific countries are invited to the city of Fukuoka in Japan with the intention of promoting inter cultural understanding and friendship.

APCC was established in November 1988 and the inaugural convention was run as part of the Asia-Pacific Expo, "Yokatopia", the commemorative event to celebrate the 100th anniversary of the founding of Fukuoka City. Since then the summer invitation program has been held annually in Fukuoka and in 2008 the 20th anniversary of APCC was celebrated.

== Objectives ==
The main objectives of APCC are:

- To carry out a project encouraging exchange between children from the Asian-Pacific region.
- To generate appreciation for the cultures of other nations and regions, with the aim of promoting mutual understanding and friendship.
- To nurture international awareness in young people.
- To realize world peace and co-existence through these activities.

== The Programme ==
Each year up to 8 children (4 boys and 4 girls), aged 10 - 12 and accompanied by a chaperone, from over 54 countries in the Asia-Pacific region are invited for the annual convention held in Fukuoka in July, during the Japanese summer. The selection of the children is conducted by the liaison office appointed in each country (often a city council, education related ministry or a consulate).

These children, referred to as 'Junior Ambassadors' (JA's), all spend a week together in 'Marine House' where they get to experience many activities. They have an opportunity to understand different cultures and make long lasting international friendships during this time.

Each JA also spends a week with a Japanese family in a homestay situation, literally becoming a member of the family. These host families live in the Fukuoka Prefecture and they volunteer to be a part of this APCC program. This is a great opportunity for the child to experience Japanese culture, Japanese school-life, and the friendliness and hospitality of the Japanese people. The JA has the opportunity to experience many aspects of Japanese life such as schooling, travel, visit tourist sites and shopping.

== Mission project ==
Groups of Japanese children visit other APCC member countries to experience their different cultures to gain new experiences as in the convention. During a Mission Project, they stay mostly with former APCC participants' families, which is similar to the home-stay program at APCC. As in APCC where the Junior Ambassadors get to participate in various activities, these children also get such opportunities to establish and strengthen their friendships.

=== Other sub projects ===
- Exchange Project - Promoting cultural exchange between foreign children who participate in the invitation project.
- Support Project - Promoting Bridge Club to improve exchange between APCC participants.
- Information sharing project - Holding various events such as symposiums and forums where the participants can share their knowledge and experiences.
- Human Resource Development Project - To recruit volunteers and work actively with them to increase their awareness of others' needs and to continue ongoing education for previous APCC volunteers to equip them with the skills required for leadership.

== Bridge Club (BC) ==
Bridge Club was formed in 1998 at the 10th anniversary of the APCC to establish a worldwide network of APCC participants. All APCC participants automatically become members of Bridge Club. Bridge Club Japan was initially formed and then followed on by some more other countries.

=== Objectives of a Bridge Club ===
Peace Ambassadors taking an oath.

The main objectives of a Bridge Club are:

- To foster leaders with a global perspective who will shape the world in the future.
- To build a network of "Global Citizens" free from religious, political and economic restrictions.
- To expand this network across the world, establish a circle of friendship and work towards creating a peaceful society.

In order to achieve these goals, the Bridge Club reaches out beyond the limits of the APCC to form a human network around the world through its local BC activities. Each BC has their own activities depending on local needs. For example, humanitarian assistance, cultural exchange, intercultural education and training for JAs, and etcetera. The Bridge Club also acts as an alumni association for former participants of the APCC, enabling them to keep in touch and sustain their friendships throughout the world.

At the 10th anniversary of the APCC, 69 of the former participants of the convention (Junior Ambassadors) were invited back to participate in it. Since then every year some selected former JAs from some countries are invited as "Peace Ambassadors". Their main responsibility is to carry on with the projects of BRIDGE CLUBs and to guide and assist the Junior Ambassadors.

== A brief history ==
Convention	Year	Main Activities
	1988	November – Establishment of the Asian-Pacific Children's Convention in Fukuoka.
1st APCC	1989	1st APCC was run as part of the Asia-Pacific Expo, “Yokatopia”, the commemorative event to celebrate the 100th anniversary of the founding of Fukuoka City.
2nd APCC	1990	Five boys and five girls at the age of 11 were invited from each participating countries and regions. Monument was erected at Uminonakamichi Seaside Park in honor of the first 2 Conventions.
3rd APCC	1991	Children's ceremony “Dream’s Key” was held. Children's Convention exhibits were displayed in Hakata and Tenjin areas.
4th APCC	1992	March – “APCC Supporters’ Association” was officially established. Exchange event with Princess Noriko was held.
5th APCC	1993	10,000 participants joined the commemorative cultural exchange event at Fukuoka Dome. 1500 children in Fukuoka sang a song of welcome and Junior Ambassadors (JAs) sang and danced in traditional costumes.
6th APCC	1994	First Mission Project, “Earth Wind” was executed. 200 children from Fukuoka visited 10 different countries during Spring vacation.
7th APCC	1995	The first “International Children’s Forum” was held for the exchange of children's ideas on culture of life. There was also held “Energy Forum” where children thought about the energy for the future. 3000 people participated in a farewell party.
8th APCC	1996	Children from areas affected by the Kobe earthquake in 1995 were invited to participate. December – Greeting cards were sent to all the former participants, and they sent back the words of thanks to the APCC office. An energy workshop with artist Hibino Katsuhiko was held.
9th APCC	1997	The theme song "We are the BRIDGE", logo and APCC goods were developed. A volunteer registration system was established and over 500 people registered.APCC news became available on the Internet and the 1st newsletter was issued.
10th APCC	1998	69 Peace Ambassadors (former JAs) joined for the 10th anniversary and the Bridge Club was established. The “Asian-Pacific Children’s Summit” was held.The commemorative booklets of APCC 10th anniversary were issued. A Tennis Clinic with Matsuoka Shuzo was held.
11th APCC	1999	Received an award for participation in the Dontaku Parade. The APCC Festival was held in the “Minato 100-year Anniversary Park” in Kashii Park Port.
12th APCC	2000	The “School Visit Program” was established and JAs experienced school life in Fukuoka.
13th APCC	2001	Local citizens started to be recruited as chaperons for the Mission Project. Three of Fukuoka's Sister & Friendship Cities (Guangzhou, Ipoh, Oakland) began to join APCC.
14th APCC	2002	February – Established as an official NPO to participate. JAs were able to meet Avispa soccer players on the field as “Avispa Kids” prior to a match.
15th APCC	2003	Invitation Project was cancelled due to SARS. The “Mirai no Mori”, “Heart from FUKUOKA”, and “BRIDGE CLUB International Volunteer Project” were established for the 15th anniversary of APCC.
16th APCC	2004	“The World Assembly for Junior Ambassadors” was held in conjunction with the JCI World Congress in Fukuoka. Children from 14 countries/regions in Europe, Africa, Central and South America joined it. 240 local children gathered together at “Global Arena” in Munakata to build a friendship.
17th APCC	2005	100 local children joined the Exchange Camp. The “Smile to Smile” project developed to support victims of the Indian Ocean earthquake.
18th APCC	2006	Representatives from Asian-Pacific Embassies visited the Exchange Camp.
19th APCC	2007	With support from the well-known singer and actor Tetsuya Takeda and others, APCC ran a large-scale PR campaign in Fukuoka.
20th APCC	2008	The number of host countries was expanded in the Mission Project, and 150 local children visited 10 countries.
21st APCC	2009	Awaiting information
22ndAPCC	2010	Awaiting information
23rdAPCC	2011	An artist Mr Hibono hosted a workshop for the participants to make an Art piece of pieces of cloth together. Since there was an earthquake in Fukushima that year, there were fundraising activities to help the affected residents in Japan.
