= Kyushu Zokei Art College =

Coordinates: 33°40′10″N 130°26′50″E

Kyushu Sangyo University, Zokei Junior College of Art and Design (九州産業大学造形短期大学部, Kyūshū sangyo daigaku zōkei tanki daigakubu) is a private junior college in Fukuoka, Fukuoka, Japan, established in 1968. It is affiliated to Kyushu Sangyo University.
