= Hirotaro Yamasaki =

Japanese politician (1941–2021)

- 山崎 広太郎

Mayor of Fukuoka
- In office 7 December 1998 – 6 December 2006
- Preceded by: Keiichi Kuwahara
- Succeeded by: Hiroshi Yoshida

Member of the House of Representatives
- In office 18 July 1993 – 27 September 1996
- Preceded by: Seat established
- Succeeded by: Constituency abolished
- Constituency: Fukuoka 1st

Member of the Fukuoka City Council
- In office 1971–1990
- Constituency: Minami Ward

Personal details
- Born: 3 September 1941 Zenrahoku Province, Korea, Empire of Japan
- Died: 11 March 2021 (aged 79) Fukuoka, Japan
- Party: Independent
- Other political affiliations: LDP (1971–1993); JNP (1993–1996); NFP (1996–1998)

Hirotaro Yamasaki (山崎 広太郎, Yamasaki Hirotarō; 3 September 1941 – 11 March 2021) was a Japanese politician. He served as Mayor of Fukuoka from 1998 to 2006, a member of the House of Representatives from 1993 to 1996, and served on the Fukuoka City Council from 1971 to 1990.
