= Daiichi University of Pharmacy =

Private university in Fukuoka, Fukuoka, Japan

Coordinates: 33.564228°N 130.419355°E

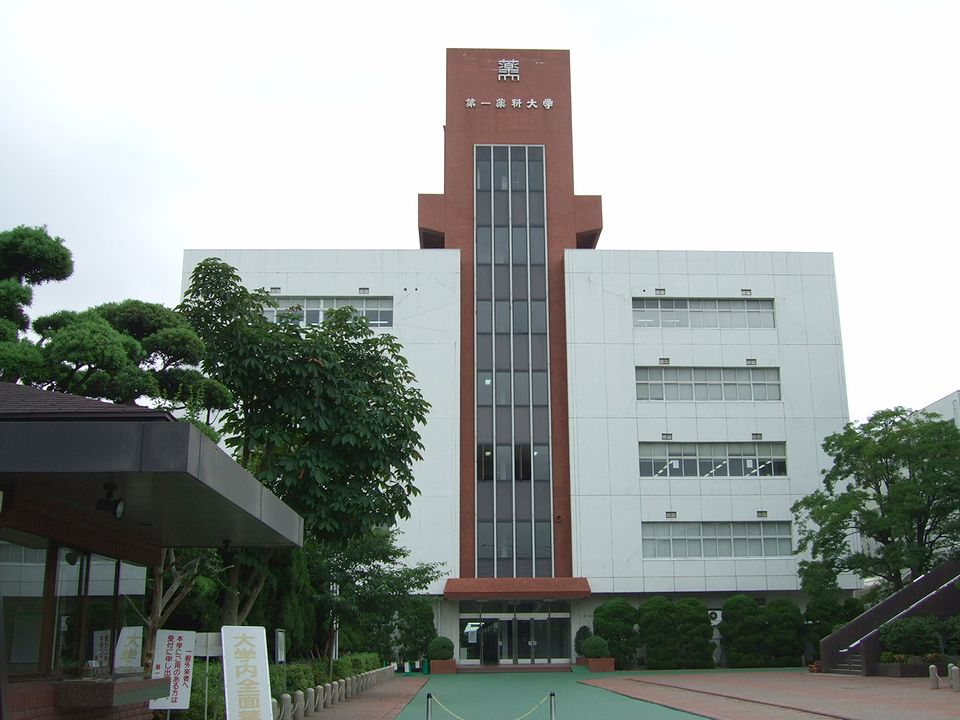
Daiichi University of Pharmacy

Daiichi University of Pharmacy (第一薬科大学, Daiichi yakka daigaku) is a private university in Fukuoka, Fukuoka, Japan, established in 1960 and contributes to wide variety of medical research within Japan. It is part of the Tsuzuki Educational Group.
