= Bombing of Fukuoka =

Pacific War bombing by the United States against Japan

- Part of the air raids on Japan, part of the Pacific War
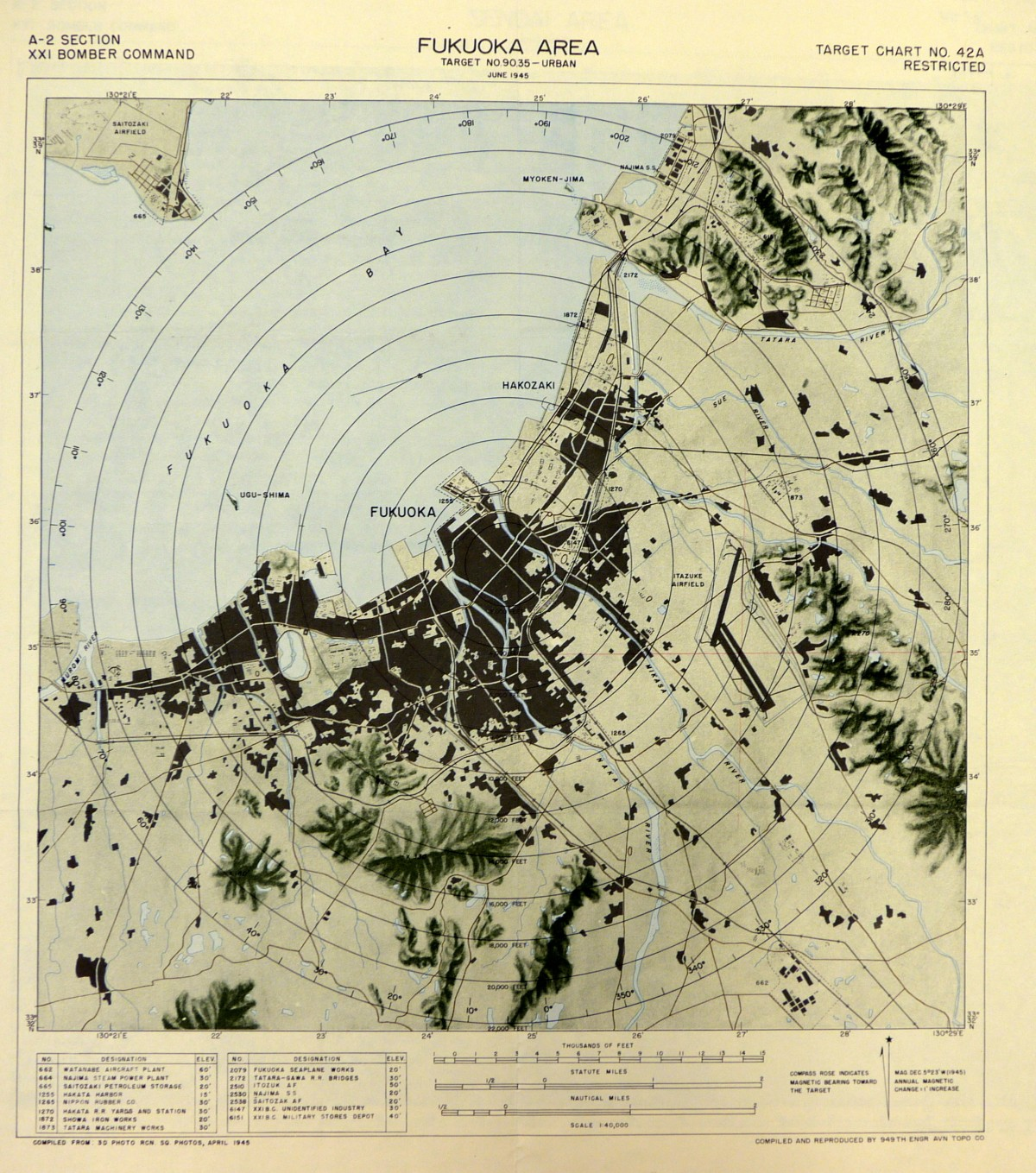
- A target map of the Fukuoka area prepared by the USAAF's XXI Bomber Command in June 1945
| Date | 19 June 1945 |
| Location | Fukuoka, Japan |
| Result | American victory |

Belligerents
| United States | Japan |

Units involved
| XXI Bomber Command | |

Strength
| 239 aircraft dispatched 224 attacked Fukuoka | |

Casualties and losses
| | 953 killed |
- 21.5% of the city destroyed

The bombing of Fukuoka (Fukuoka dai-kūshū) took place by United States Army Air Forces Boeing B-29 Superfortress heavy bombers on 19 June 1945. This operation formed part of the allied air raids on Japan during the Pacific War, and destroyed 21.5 percent of the city. B-29s also dropped naval mines near Fukuoka harbor on seven occasions between May and July 1945, and the city was attacked twice by American fighter aircraft.

== 19 June 1945 raid ==
The single bombing raid on Fukuoka formed part of a campaign by the USAAF's XXI Bomber Command targeting medium-sized Japanese cities which began in mid-June 1945 and continued until the end of the war. These attacks used firebombing tactics to destroy the cities, and were conducted as a follow-on from raids which had devastated most of Japan's major cities. Fukuoka, with a population of 323,200, was the largest city targeted in this campaign. Most of these raids were conducted by a single wing of B-29s, which allowed XXI Bomber Command to attack four cities a night. However, Fukuoka and Ōmuta (on 26 July) were targeted by two wings due to their size.

The 73rd and 313th Bombardment Wings were assigned to attack Fukuoka. These units dispatched a total of 239 B-29s. Of these, 223 bombed the primary target. Another four bombed targets of opportunity in Tomitaka, Chichijima, Miyazaki and Fukuoka. All of the B-29s returned to base.

On 20 June, four American B-29 airmen who were being held as prisoners of war at Fukuoka were murdered by Japanese soldiers. These killings were motivated by the casualties and damage caused by the raid and a belief among the personnel involved that Japan would soon be invaded. Another 29 captured American airmen were murdered at Fukuoka in August 1945.

== Minelaying ==
Fukuoka harbor was targeted as part of a large-scale aerial minelaying campaign. The first minelaying operation targeting the harbor took place on 25 May 1945. 15 B-29s from the 9th Bombardment Group were dispatched, of which 14 laid mines. All of the bombers returned to base. The 9th Bombardment Group dropped further mines off Fukuoka harbor on 27 May.

Fukuoka harbor was targeted again in June. On 7 June, ten B-29s of the 505th Bombardment Group were dispatched, and six laid mines. Eight 505th Bombardment Group aircraft dropped further mines off the city on 15 June. The 505th Bombardment Group struck again on 23 June, with nine B-29s laying mines. One of these aircraft was lost during the operation.

Further operations were conducted in July. On 13 July, three B-29s of the 6th Bombardment Group were dispatched to lay mines near Fukuoka harbor. Historian Robert Mann has written that it is not known how many of these aircraft dropped mines. Another minelaying operation was conducted by six B-29s from the 504th Bombardment Group on 29 July, but Mann also notes that the number which actually dropped mines is not known.

== Other operations ==
Fukuoka was attacked twice by USAAF fighter aircraft. On 23 June, Republic P-47 Thunderbolt fighters from the Seventh Air Force attacked an airfield at Hakata in Fukuoka. North American P-51 Mustang fighters of the Fifth Air Force attacked Fukuoka harbor on 3 July. The fighters destroyed several floatplanes.

On 17 July a B-29 from the 39th Bombardment Group conducted a radar reconnaissance mission against Fukuoka.

== Results ==
The 19 June raid destroyed 1.37 square miles (3.5 km^{2}) of Fukuoka's urban area, representing 21.5 percent of the city. Wartime Japanese reports stated that 953 people were killed in all the attacks on Fukuoka.

== See also ==
- Strategic bombing during World War II
- Evacuations of civilians in Japan during World War II
