= Seika Women's Junior College =

College from Japan

Coordinates: 33°32′49″N 130°27′12″E

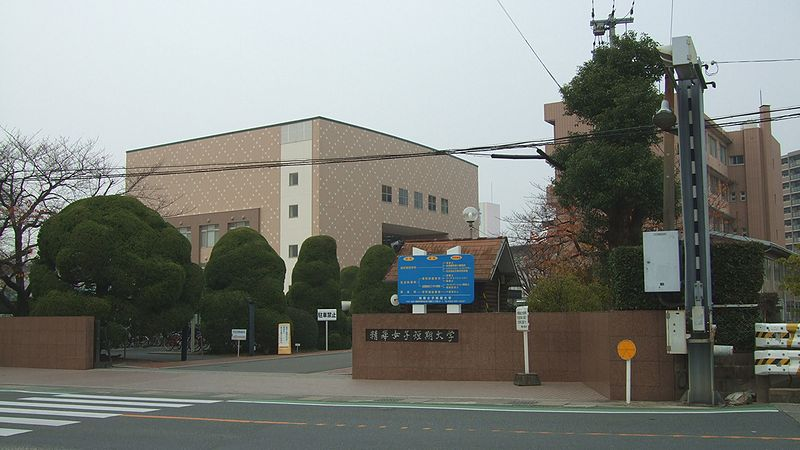
Front View of Seika Women's Junior College, Hakata Ward, Fukuoka City, Fukuoka, Japan

Seika Women's Junior College (精華女子短期大学, Seika joshi tanki daigaku) is a private junior women's college in Fukuoka, Fukuoka, Japan, established in 1967.

== Alumni ==
- Satoko Nakano, model and actress
