= Noriko Fukuda =

Japanese announcer

- 福田 典子
- Born: 12 February 1991 (age 35); Fukuoka, Fukuoka Prefecture, Japan
- Other names: Pekun (ペクン); Fuku-chan (福ちゃん); Fukuda (福田); Fuku-ana (福田アナ)
- Education: Rikkyo University School of Business Department of Business Administration
- Years active: 2013–
- Employers: TV Tokyo; RKB Mainichi Broadcasting (2013–16)
- Television: Tsuiseki Live! Sports Watcher; Moya Moya Summers 2
- Website: Noriko Fukuda

Noriko Fukuda (福田 典子, Fukuda Noriko; born 12 February 1991) is a Japanese announcer for TV Tokyo, and former RKB Mainichi Broadcasting announcer.

== Appearances ==
=== Current ===
- Tsuiseki Live! Sports Watcher (Oct 2016 –)
  - Weekday ver. (Note: Appeared as a substitute on 23 August, 7 September, and 15 September 2016, 12 September 2017, and 27 March 2018.)
    - Mondays; 3 Oct 2016 – 27 Mar 2017
    - Fridays; 7 Apr 2017 –
- Moya Moya Summers 2 (3rd Assistant) – 23 Oct 2016 –

=== Former ===
==== TV Tokyo ====
- Sokuhō! Rio de Janeiro Olympic – 11 Aug 2016
- 2016 Tour de France Saitama Criterium – 19 Oct 2016

==== RKB Mainichi Broadcasting ====
===== Television =====
- Sunday Watch – Sports Corner
- Kyō-kan TV (Changed corner from Apr 2015)
- Premium Marche: Shifuku no Okurimono – Narration
- Shunkan Sports (14 Apr 2014 – End)
- Joshi-ana no Batsu Shinshun Special (5 Jan 2014)

===== Radio =====
- Voicebook 10 Oct 2013 – 27 Mar 2014
- Koji Sakurai: Insight – 2016*Mizuki Tanaka's substitute

==== School days ====
- BS Fuji News (BS Fuji) – Jul 2011 – Jan 2012

Preceded by Eri Kano	Moya Moya Summers 2 3rd Assistant; October 2016 –	Succeeded by —
