= Koran Women's Junior College =

Coordinates: 33°33′09″N 130°26′07″E

Koran Women's Junior College (香蘭女子短期大学, Kōran joshi tanki daigaku) is a private junior women's college in Fukuoka, Fukuoka, Japan, established in 1958.
