= Seiji Naito =

Japanese urologist (born 1949)

Seiji Naito (内藤 誠二, Naitō Seiji) (born 1949) is a Japanese urologist who has written over 250 peer-reviewed articles in print.

== Biography ==
Naito was born in Fukuoka, Japan and received his medical degree from the Kyushu University in 1980. From 1984 to 1986 he served as a visiting assistant professor at the University of Texas and from 2006 to 2008 he served as the main President of the Japanese Society of Endourology. A year later, he held the same position at the Japanese Urological Association and was an editor-in-chief of the International Journal of Urology at the same time. Currently he works as a chairman of the Local Organizing Committee and is an active member of the European Association of Urology and the Urological Association of Asia.
