= Fukuoka =

Fukuoka 福岡市
- Prefecture capital and Designated city
- Fukuoka City
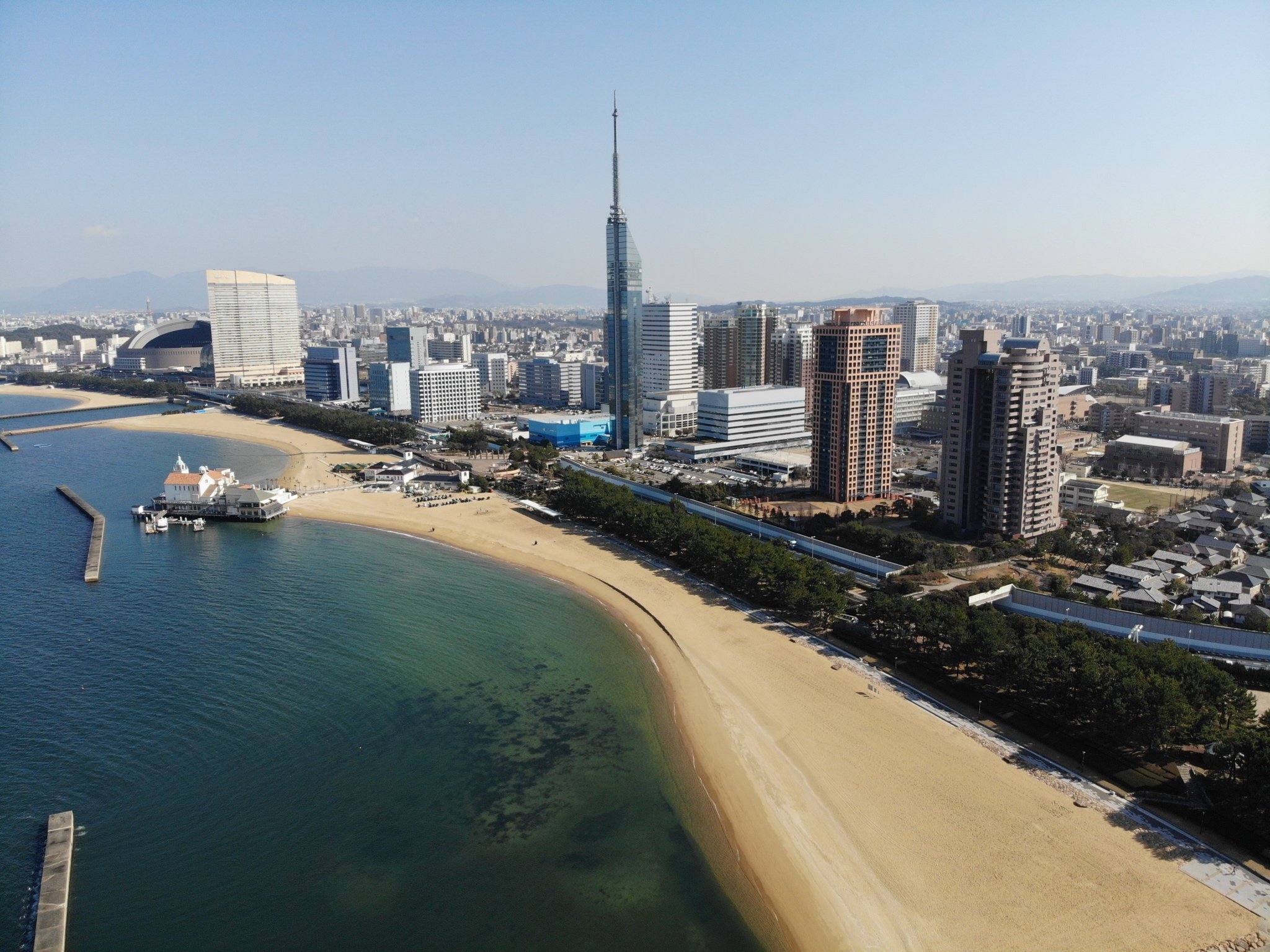
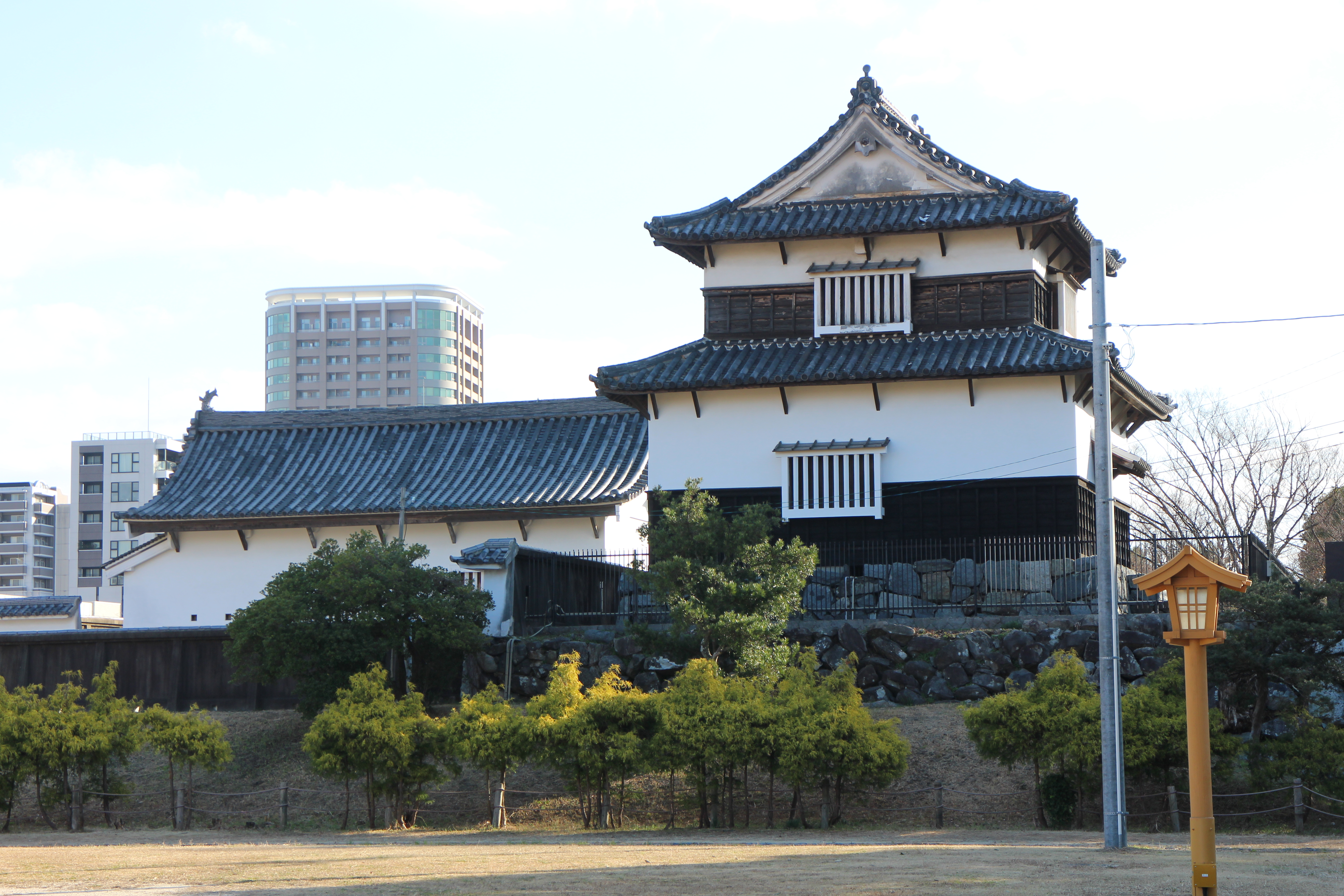
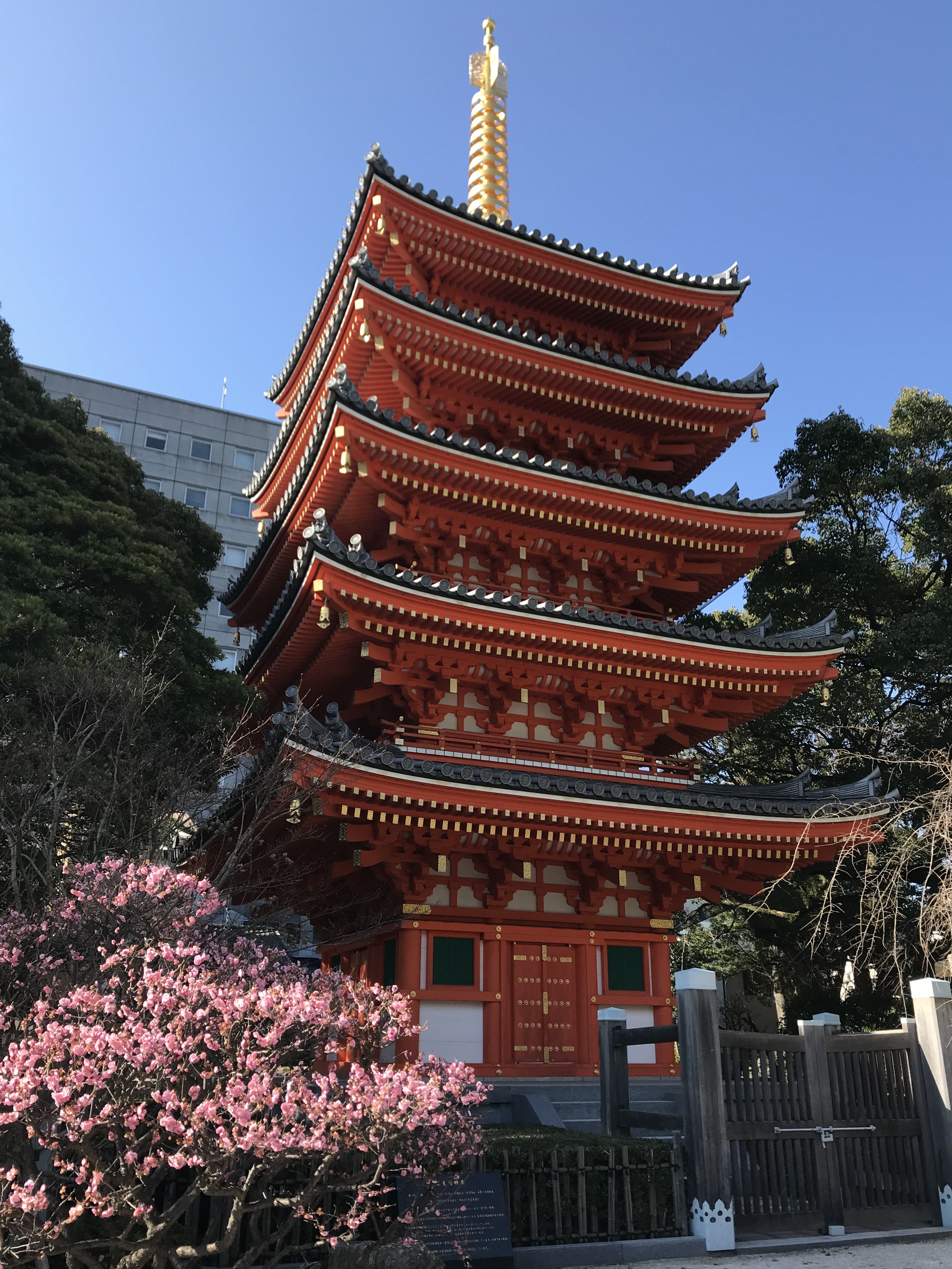
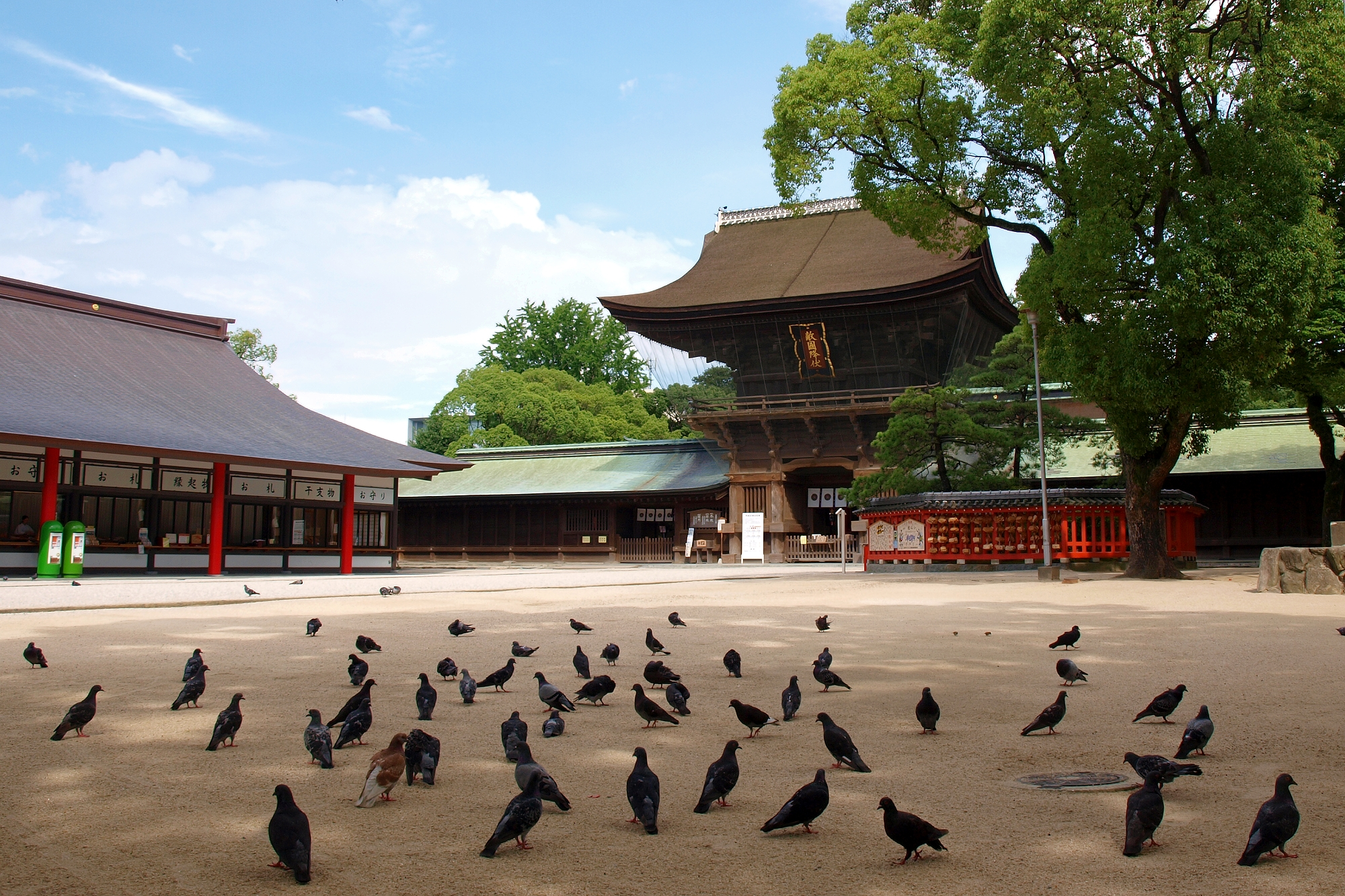
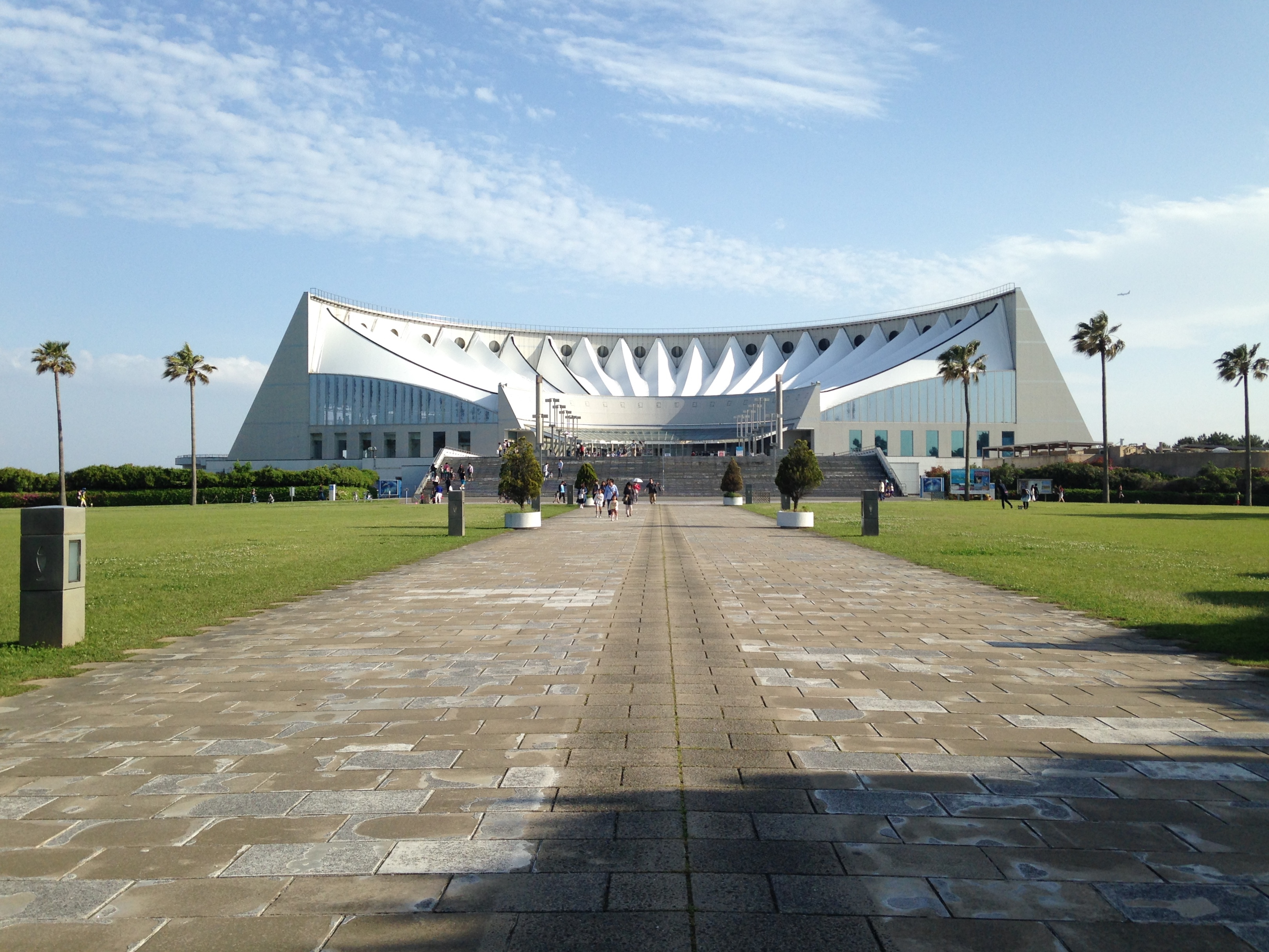
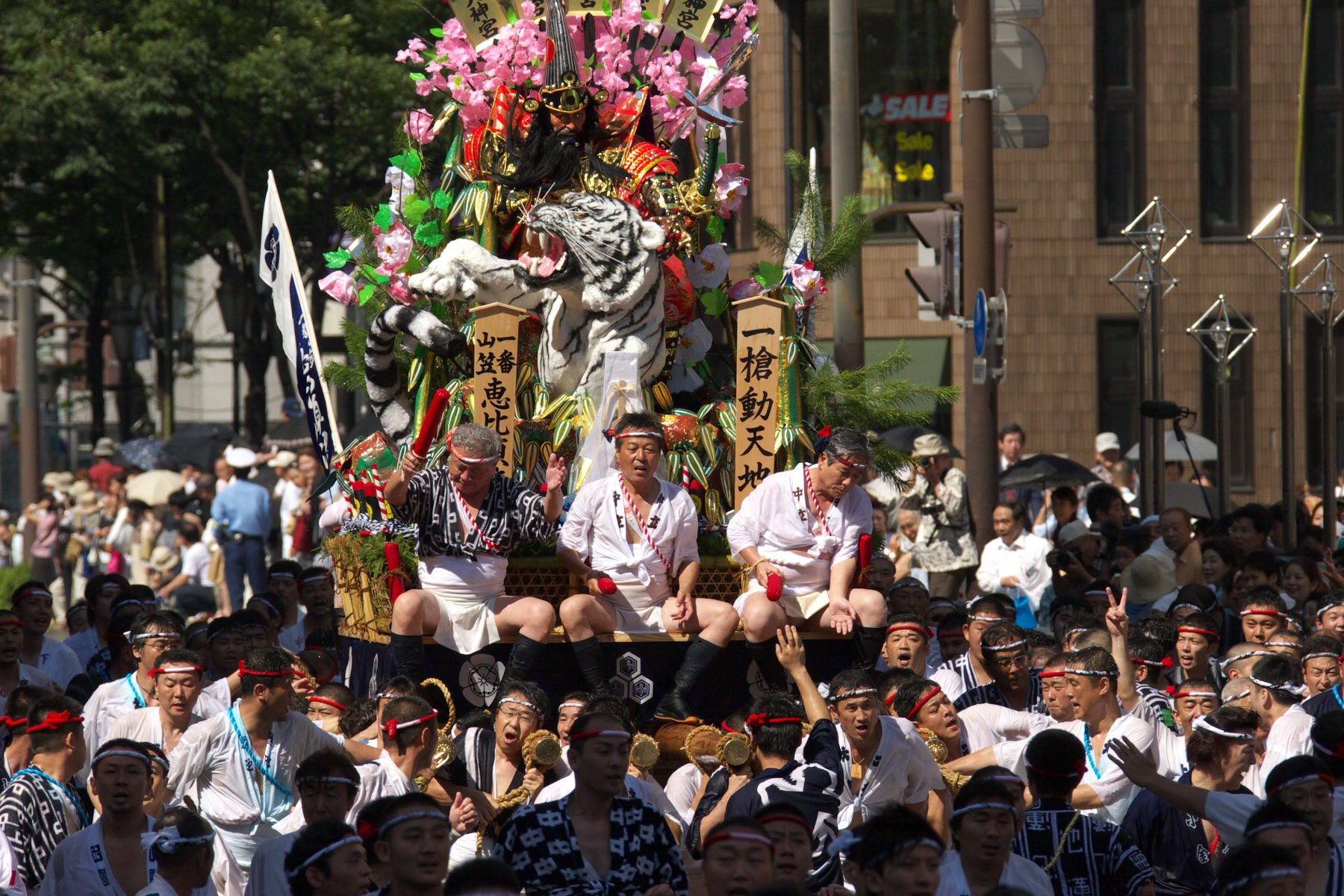
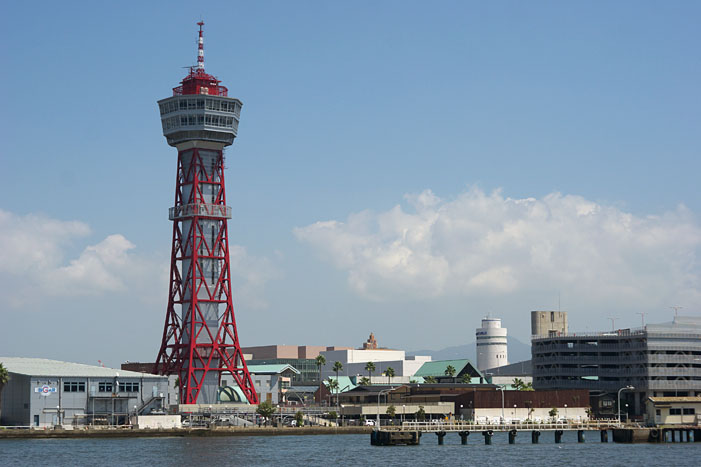
- Skyline at Seaside Momochi Fukuoka Castle Tochoji Temple Hakozaki Shrine Marine World Uminonakamichi Hakata Gion Yamakasa Hakata Port Tower

- Flag Seal

- Location of Fukuoka in Fukuoka Prefecture

- Location in Japan
- Coordinates: 33°35′24″N 130°24′06″E
- Country: Japan
- Region: Kyushu
- Prefecture: Fukuoka Prefecture
- First official recorded: 57 AD
- City Settled: April 1, 1889

Government
  - Mayor: Sōichirō Takashima (since December 2010)

Area
  - Prefecture capital and Designated city: 343.39 km^{2} (132.58 sq mi)

Population (June 1, 2021)
  - Prefecture capital and Designated city: 1,603,543
  - Density: 4,669.7/km^{2} (12,095/sq mi)
  - Metro (2015): 2,565,501 (5th)
- Time zone: UTC+9 (Japan Standard Time)
  - Tree: Camphor laurel
  - Flower: Camellia
  - Bird: Black-headed gull
- Website: www.city.fukuoka.lg.jp

Fukuoka
- "Fukuoka" in kanji

Japanese name
- Kanji: 福岡
- Hiragana: ふくおか
- Katakana: フクオカ
Transcriptions
- Romanization: Fukuoka

Fukuoka (福岡市, Fukuoka-shi; [ɸɯ̥̈.kɯ̈́.ò̞.kä̀, -ó̞.kä́.ɕì]) is a designated city in the Kyushu region of Japan and the capital city of Fukuoka Prefecture. The city is built along the shores of Hakata Bay, and has been a center of international commerce since ancient times. The area has long been considered the gateway to the country, as it is the nearest point among Japan's main islands to the Asian mainland. Although humans have occupied the area since the Jomon period, some of the earliest settlers of the Yayoi period arrived in the Fukuoka area. The city rose to prominence during the Yamato period, and because of the cross-cultural exposure, and relatively great distance from the social and political centers of Kyoto, Osaka, and later, Edo (Tokyo), Fukuoka gained a distinctive local culture and dialect that has persisted to the present day.

Fukuoka is the most populous city on Kyūshū island, followed by Kitakyushu. It is the largest city and metropolitan area west of Keihanshin. The city was designated by government ordinance on April 1, 1972. Greater Fukuoka, with a population of 2.5 million people (2005 census), is part of the heavily industrialized Fukuoka–Kitakyushu zone.

As of 2015, Fukuoka is Japan's sixth largest city, having passed the population of Kobe. In July 2011, Fukuoka surpassed the population of Kyoto. Since the founding of Kyoto in 794, this marks the first time that a city west of the Kansai region has had a larger population than Kyoto.

== Etymology ==
The name Fukuoka (福岡) combines the characters fuku (福), meaning “good fortune” or “blessing,” and oka (岡), meaning “hill.” The designation was introduced in 1600 by daimyō Kuroda Nagamasa, who named his new castle town after the Fukuoka district of Bizen Province, the ancestral home of the Kuroda clan.

== History ==
=== Pre-Tokugawa period ===
Exchanges from the continent and the Northern Kyushu area date as far back as Old Stone Age. It has been thought that waves of immigrants arrived in Northern Kyushu from mainland Asia. Among Jomon period sites, early Jomon pit dwellings have been found in the eastern Itoshima Peninsula, while early to late Jomon pottery and stone-collecting hearths have been found at Kashiwara Site (South Ward). Among middle Jomon period sites, clusters of pits for storing yew and other acorns have been found at Nodame Newatari Site (South Ward) and Arita Site (Sawara Ward). Archeological research revealed that the Fukuoka Plain was underwater during the Jomon period, and like the Paleolithic period, only the aforementioned sites at the edge of Hizen Island remain.

During the Yayoi period, the rise of early rice cultivation led to the development of large, moated villages like the Itazuke Site, and the region served as a hub of activity marked by the introduction of technologies like bronze and copper tools. Fukuoka's location near the Sea of Japan made it an early natural point of entry for trading and cultural influences from countries on the mainland such as Korea and China.

=== Contact with China ===
Interaction between the region and the Han dynasty of China was recorded as early as 57 A.D. According to the Book of the Later Han, an envoy visited the imperial court during the reign of Emperor Guangwu, and in recognition of this diplomatic mission, the ruler received a gold seal, discovered later in the 17th century.

By the end of the Asuka Period, Fukuoka, sometimes called the Port of Dazaifu (大宰府), had grown from a small town into a critical administrative center, serving as the regional government headquarters for Kyushu and as a trade centre between Japan and Tang China. Ancient texts, such as the Kojiki, Kanyen, and archaeology confirm this was a critical place in the founding of Japan. Some scholars claim that it was the first place outsiders and the Imperial Family set foot, but like many early Japan origin theories, it remains contested.

The Book of Song recorded that King Bu, thought to be the Emperor Yūryaku, sent a letter in 478 A.D. seeking the Chinese emperor's approval for the establishment of three ministries for administration of the kingdom similar to those in use in China; the remains of a ward office and temple in Ooho (大保), 15 km (9 mi) south from Dazaifu, may be one of these ministries. In addition, remains of the Kōrokan (鴻臚館, Government Guest House) were found in Fukuoka underneath a part of the ruins of Fukuoka Castle.

=== Heian and Kamakura periods ===
Following the collapse of the Tang dynasty, relations with China declined, and Japan went into a period of isolationism. While the existing Kōrokan declined by the end of the Heian Period in the 12th century, the city's importance as a trading hub continued to grow, evidenced by the discovery of a late Heian period stone revetment from the port in modern times.

As a result of the introduction of Buddhism to Japan, several historically important Buddhist temples in Fukuoka were constructed by monks after their studies. Monk Eisai founded Shōfuku-ji which is known today as the oldest zen temple in Japan. Eisai is also known for establishing a new sect of Zen Buddhism (Rinzai) and for bringing tea and tea culture to Japan. Monk Kukai established Tocho-ji, and Joten-ji was built by Enni who is also known for bringing Udon noodles first from China to Japan.

Hakata Gion Yamakasa is the most famous festival in Fukuoka and the origin of it is believed to date back to 1241, when Enni, the founder of Jotenji temple, had people carry him around the town on a platform while praying against the plague and eventually eliminated it.

=== Mongol invasions (1274–1281) ===
Kublai Khan of the Mongol Empire turned his attention towards Japan starting in 1268, exerting a new external pressure on Japan which it had no experience of dealing with. Kublai Khan first sent an envoy to Japan to make the Shogunate acknowledge Khan's suzerainty. After the refusal of the Kamakura shogunate to recognize the Khan, the Mongols repeatedly sent envoys thereafter, each time urging the Shogunate to accept their proposal, but to no avail.

In 1274, Kublai Khan mounted an invasion of the northern part of Kyushu with a fleet of 900 ships and 33,000 troops, including troops from Goryeo on the Korean Peninsula. This initial invasion was compromised by a combination of incompetence and severe storms. After the invasion attempt of 1274, Japanese samurai built a stone barrier 20 km (12 mi) in length bordering the coast of Hakata Bay in what is now the city of Fukuoka. The wall, 2–3 metres (6 ft 7 in – 9 ft 10 in) in height and having a base width of 3 metres (9.8 ft), was constructed between 1276 and 1277, and was excavated in the 1930s.

Kublai sent another envoy to Japan in 1279. At that time, Hōjō Tokimune of the Hōjō clan (1251–1284) was the Eighth Regent. Not only did he decline the offer, but he beheaded the five Mongolian emissaries after summoning them to Kamakura. Infuriated, Kublai organized another attack on Fukuoka Prefecture in 1281, mobilizing 140,000 soldiers and 4,000 ships. The Japanese defenders, numbering around 40,000, were no match for the Mongols and the invasion force made it as far as Dazaifu, 15 km (9 mi) south of the city of Fukuoka. However, the Japanese were again aided by severe weather, this time by a typhoon that weakened the Mongolian troops, thwarting the invasion.

It was this typhoon that came to be called the Kamikaze (Divine Wind), and was the origin of the term Kamikaze used to indicate suicide attacks by military aviators of the Empire of Japan against Allied naval vessels during World War II.

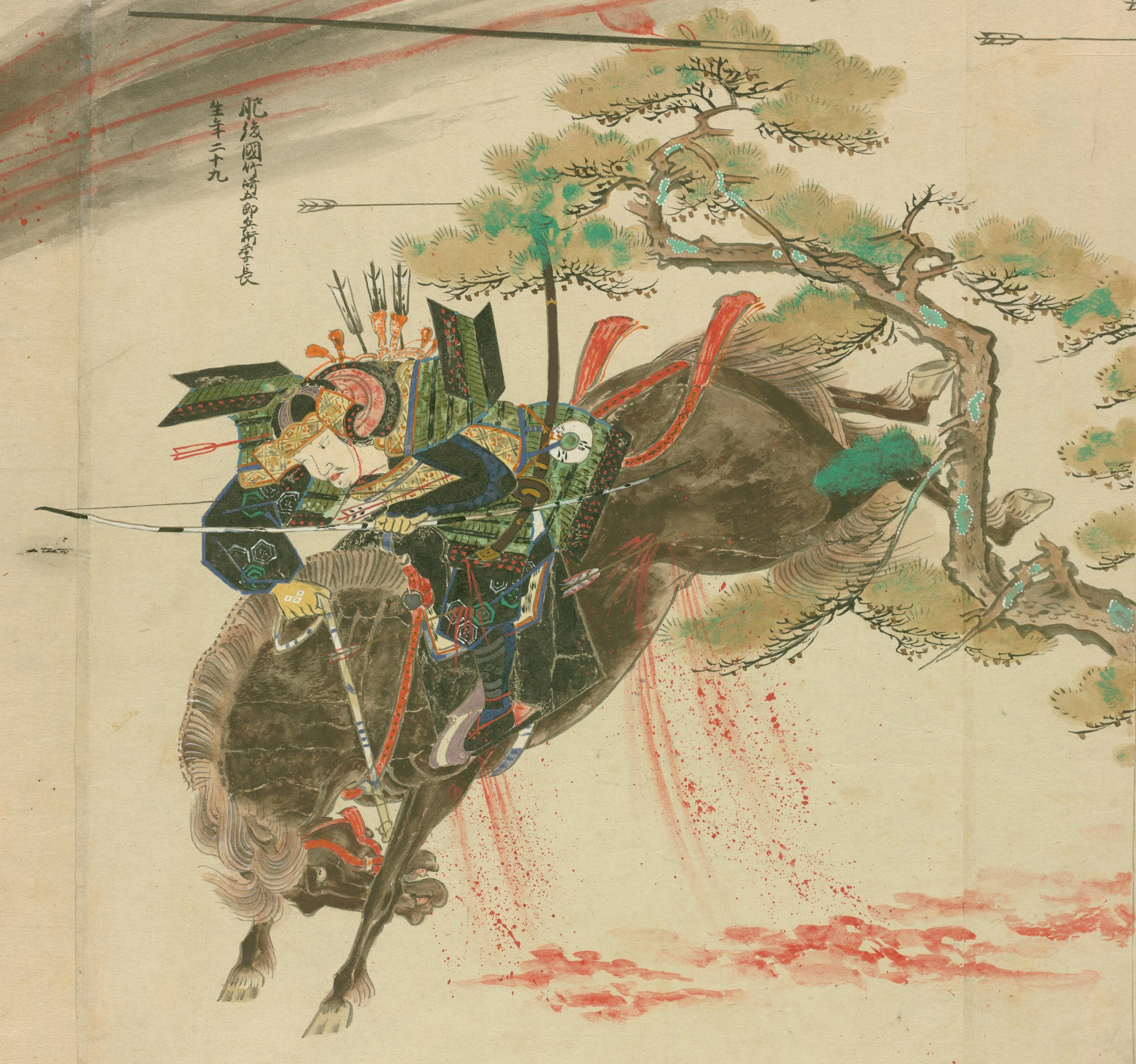
Takezaki Suenaga

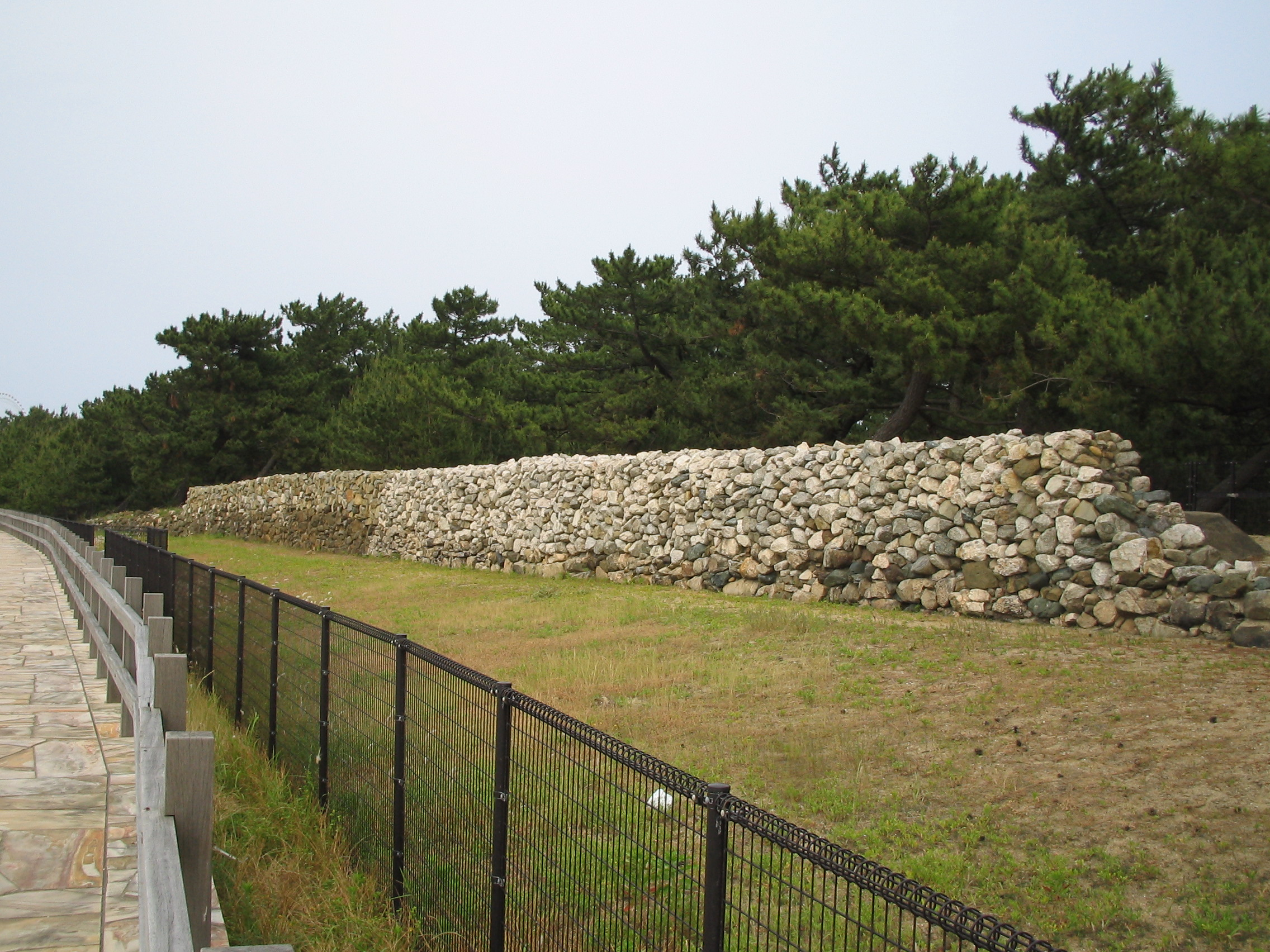
Genkō Bōrui

=== Formation of the modern city (1300–1889) ===
By the end of the 1300s, the threat of Mongol invasions declined, and Fukuoka began to flourish. The 1300s also marked the fall of the Kamakura shogunate and the rise of the Muromachi shogunate. Kyushu, including Fukuoka, was a contested region during this transition. Throughout the Muromachi period, Hakata was the first free city in Japanese history, with its government run by a council of 12 wealthy merchants called Tongyoji. It prospered as a trading city alongside Sakai City, whose government was run by a council of 36 members. The region continued to experience growth, and Hakata continued to serve as Japan's primary port for trade with mainland Asia, particularly with the Song and Yuan dynasties of China and with Korea.

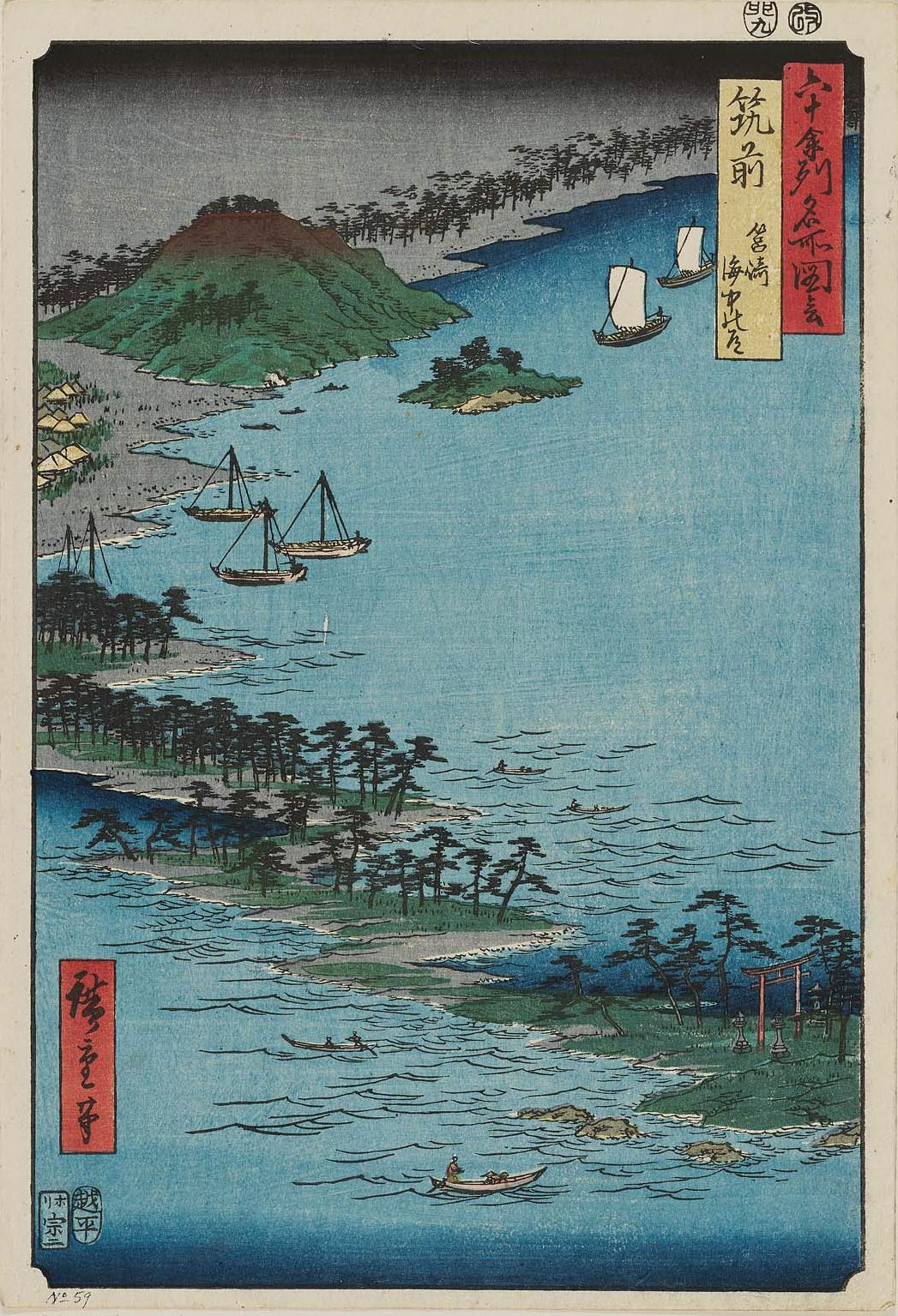
Famous Views of the Sixty-odd Provinces

By the 1500s, the control shifts from various clans, and ultimately the fall to Toyotomi Hideyoshi's forces, marked a period of conflict for the region. The Battle of Sekigahara eventually led to Kuroda Nagamasa being granted the region and beginning the construction of Fukuoka Castle in the early 1600s. Fukuoka was formerly the residence of the powerful daimyō of Chikuzen Province, and played an important part in the medieval history of Japan. The renowned temple of Tokugawa Ieyasu in the district was destroyed by fire during the Boshin War of 1868. The modern city was formed on April 1, 1889, with the merger of the former cities of Hakata and Fukuoka. Historically, Hakata was the port and merchant district, and was more associated with the area's culture and remains the main commercial area today. On the other hand, the Fukuoka area was home to many samurai, and its name has been used since Kuroda Nagamasa, the first daimyō of Chikuzen Province, named it after his birthplace in Okayama Prefecture and the "old Fukuoka" is the main shopping district, now called Tenjin.

When Hakata and Fukuoka decided to merge, a meeting was held to decide the name for the new city, and after multiple ties, Fukuoka ultimately was chosen. However, Hakata is still used to refer to the Hakata area of the city and, most famously, to refer to the city's train station, Hakata Station, and dialect, Hakata-ben.

=== 20th century ===
Fukuoka continued to grow during the early 20th century following the Meiji Restoration and industrialization of Japan. The city saw exponential growth with the introduction of new colleges and universities such as the Fukuoka Medical College in 1903 and the introduction of citywide public transit such as the Fukuoka Streetcar Service in 1910.

During World War II, Fukuoka played a significant role as a regional military center and base for the Imperial Japanese Military due to its geographic position near the Korean Peninsula and China. The region also housed the largest POW base in Japan, Fukuoka 17 which operated from 1943 to 1945. In 1945, Fukuoka was firebombed on June 19, with the attack destroying 21.5 percent of the city's urban area.

==== 1945–1989 ====
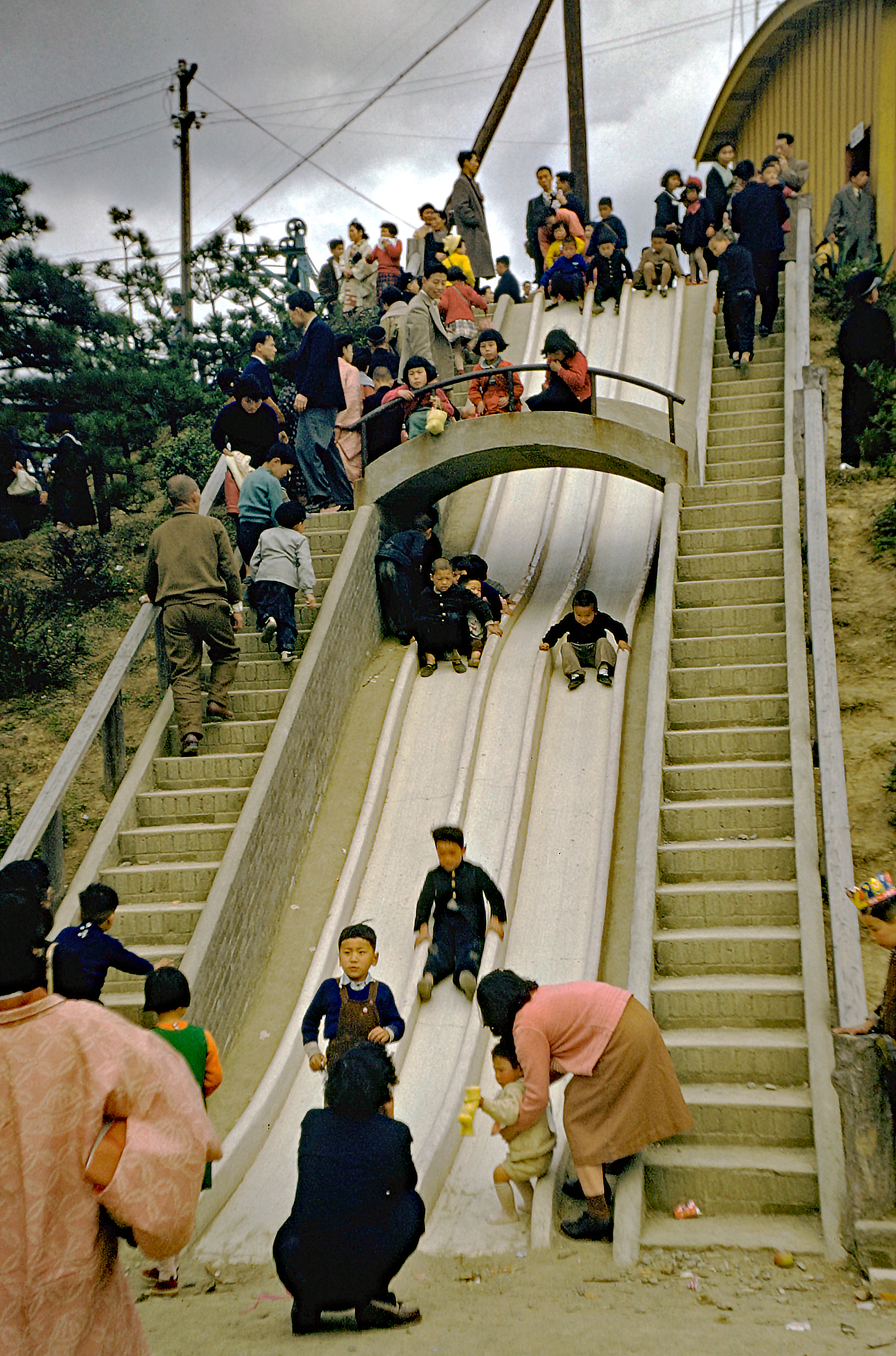
The annual Cherry Blossom Festival in 1955

Following the close of World War II, Fukuoka then began a period of recovery and development, including the rebuilding of the city and the establishment of Itazuke Air Base, which became the largest USAF base on Kyushu, in addition to a new municipal airport in 1951. The postwar era also saw the establishment of key institutions and events in the city such as the Fukuoka Marathon in 1947, and the founding of the Fukuoka Zoo in 1953. Fukuoka benefited greatly from the Japanese economic miracle, and in 1975, absorbed the town of Sawara. 1975, Sanyō Shinkansen high-speed railway was extended to Hakata station, providing more efficient high-speed connection to Tokyo and the rest of the country.

In 1981, the Fukuoka City Subway began operations with the opening of its initial segment between Muromi and Tenjin, marking a turning point in Fukuoka's urban transit infrastructure and signifying a transition from the existing older street-level tram and bus systems toward a high-capacity, grade-separated urban rail network. In doing so, the establishment of the subway system also helped reduce surface traffic congestion in the city core and provided a more reliable and faster mode of transit. Towards the end of the 1980s, the city held two important expositions, including the 1989 Asian-Pacific Exposition, and the 30th annual meeting of the Asian Development Bank.

==== Partnership with Atlanta, Georgia, United States ====
Fukuoka established a partnership with Atlanta, Georgia after a visit by former Japan Prime Minister Toshiki Kaifu in 1994. The sister city partnership was formalized in February 2005 by Former Atlanta mayor Shirley Franklin and former Fukuoka mayor Hirotaro Yamasaki. For 20 years the program has been supporting yearly student exchanges, economic forums and cultural performances. At the yearly cultural celebration "JapanFest" in Atlanta, Fukuoka performers showcase traditional music and dance.

=== 21st century ===
In February 2005, the Nanakuma Line started operations, serving as the fourth linear motor subway line to be built in Japan. The Nanakuma Line was originally conceived in the 1960s to provide access to Nakamura Gakuen University and Fukuoka University, but the plan was subsequently amended for the line to end at Hashimoto Station. The line also linked the Central business district and the southwestern part of the city which previously unserved by rail.

In 2014, the city was selected as the National Strategic Zone for "global startups & job creation" by Japanese government, following an increase in economic activity in the region stemming from Abenomics.

== Geography ==
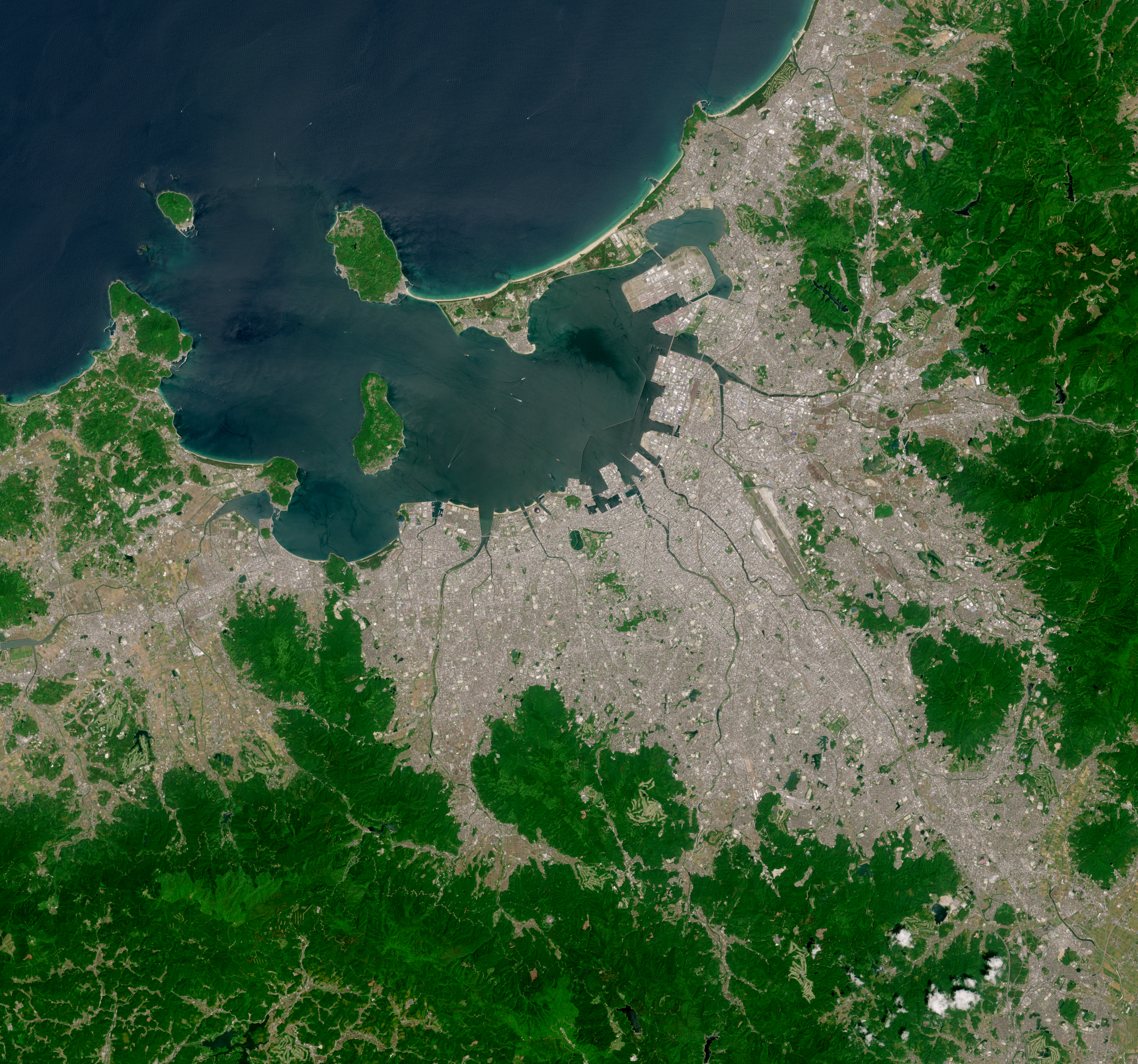
Satellite photo of Fukuoka

Fukuoka is bordered on three sides by mountains, surrounds Hakata Bay and opens on the north to the Genkai Sea. It is located 1,100 km (684 mi) from Tokyo.

The nearest overseas region is Busan Metropolitan City in Gyeongsang-do, South Korea, and the distance from Busan is about 180 km (112 miles). Fukuoka and Busan are sister cities.

=== Climate ===
Fukuoka has a humid subtropical climate (Köppen: Cfa), hot and humid summers, and relatively mild winters. The city also sees on average about 1,600 mm (63 in) of precipitation per year, with a stretch of more intense precipitation between the months of June and September.

Along with much of the prefecture, Fukuoka City has a moderate climate with an annual average temperature of 16.3 °C (61 °F), average humidity of 70% and 1,811 annual sunshine hours. Roughly 40% of the year is cloudy.

Winter temperatures rarely drop below 0 °C (32 °F) and snow cover is rarely seen, though very light snow does fall on many days if not as consistently as on the Sea of Japan side of Honshu. Spring is warm and sunnier, with cherry blossoms appearing in late March or early April. The rainy season (tsuyu) lasts for approximately six weeks through June and July, during which time the humidity is very high and temperatures hover between 25 °C (77 °F) and 30 °C (86 °F). Summers are humid and hot, with temperatures peaking around 37 °C (99 °F). Autumn, often considered to be Fukuoka's best season, is mild and dry, though the typhoon season runs between August and September.

Climate data for Fukuoka (1991−2020 normals, extremes 1890−present)
Month	Jan	Feb	Mar	Apr	May	Jun	Jul	Aug	Sep	Oct	Nov	Dec	Year
Record high °C (°F)	21.5 (70.7)	24.3 (75.7)	27.4 (81.3)	30.1 (86.2)	32.3 (90.1)	37.3 (99.1)	38.3 (100.9)	39.0 (102.2)	38.0 (100.4)	33.3 (91.9)	29.3 (84.7)	26.0 (78.8)	39.0 (102.2)
Mean maximum °C (°F)	16.3 (61.3)	18.9 (66.0)	22.2 (72.0)	26.5 (79.7)	29.8 (85.6)	32.4 (90.3)	35.5 (95.9)	36.2 (97.2)	33.7 (92.7)	28.9 (84.0)	24.0 (75.2)	18.4 (65.1)	36.5 (97.7)
Mean daily maximum °C (°F)	10.2 (50.4)	11.6 (52.9)	15.0 (59.0)	19.9 (67.8)	24.4 (75.9)	27.2 (81.0)	31.2 (88.2)	32.5 (90.5)	28.6 (83.5)	23.7 (74.7)	18.2 (64.8)	12.6 (54.7)	21.3 (70.3)
Daily mean °C (°F)	6.9 (44.4)	7.8 (46.0)	10.8 (51.4)	15.4 (59.7)	19.9 (67.8)	23.3 (73.9)	27.4 (81.3)	28.4 (83.1)	24.7 (76.5)	19.6 (67.3)	14.2 (57.6)	9.1 (48.4)	17.3 (63.1)
Mean daily minimum °C (°F)	3.9 (39.0)	4.4 (39.9)	7.2 (45.0)	11.5 (52.7)	16.1 (61.0)	20.3 (68.5)	24.6 (76.3)	25.4 (77.7)	21.6 (70.9)	16.0 (60.8)	10.6 (51.1)	5.8 (42.4)	14.0 (57.2)
Mean minimum °C (°F)	−0.4 (31.3)	0.0 (32.0)	1.8 (35.2)	5.8 (42.4)	11.3 (52.3)	16.3 (61.3)	20.8 (69.4)	22.0 (71.6)	16.9 (62.4)	10.6 (51.1)	5.3 (41.5)	1.1 (34.0)	−1.1 (30.0)
Record low °C (°F)	−6.0 (21.2)	−8.2 (17.2)	−4.7 (23.5)	−1.4 (29.5)	1.4 (34.5)	4.3 (39.7)	13.8 (56.8)	15.4 (59.7)	7.9 (46.2)	0.4 (32.7)	−2.1 (28.2)	−5.4 (22.3)	−8.2 (17.2)
Average precipitation mm (inches)	74.4 (2.93)	69.8 (2.75)	103.7 (4.08)	118.2 (4.65)	133.7 (5.26)	249.6 (9.83)	299.1 (11.78)	210.0 (8.27)	175.1 (6.89)	94.5 (3.72)	91.4 (3.60)	67.5 (2.66)	1,686.9 (66.41)
Average snowfall cm (inches)	1 (0.4)	1 (0.4)	0 (0)	0 (0)	0 (0)	0 (0)	0 (0)	0 (0)	0 (0)	0 (0)	0 (0)	0 (0)	2 (0.8)
Average precipitation days (≥ 0.5 mm)	11.0	10.7	11.4	10.8	9.8	12.7	12.4	11.2	11.0	7.9	9.9	10.2	128.9
Average relative humidity (%)	63	62	63	64	67	75	75	72	73	68	66	63	68
Mean monthly sunshine hours	104.1	123.5	161.2	188.1	204.1	145.2	172.2	200.9	164.7	175.9	137.3	112.2	1,889.4
Average ultraviolet index	3	4	6	8	9	10	11	10	8	6	4	3	7
Source 1: Japan Meteorological Agency and Weather Atlas
Source 2: Japan Meteorological Agency / NOAA

=== Disaster ===
==== Earthquakes ====
Fukuoka is not as seismically active as many other parts of Japan, but does experience occasional earthquakes. The most powerful recent earthquake registered a lower 6 of maximum 7 of the Japanese intensity scale and hit at 10:53 am local time on March 20, 2005, killing one person and injuring more than 400. The epicentre of the earthquake was in the Genkai Sea along a yet-undiscovered extension of the Kego fault that runs through the centre of Fukuoka. Genkai island, a part of Nishi-ku, was the most severely damaged by the earthquake and almost all island residents were forced to evacuate. Aftershocks continued intermittently throughout the following weeks as construction crews worked to rebuild damaged buildings throughout the city. Traditional Japanese houses, particularly in the areas of Daimyo and Imaizumi, were the most heavily damaged and many were marked for demolition, along with several apartment buildings. Insurance payments for damages were estimated at 15.8 billion yen.

A similar quake, with an intensity of 5+, also occurred one month later on April 20, 2005.

Fukuoka's major Kego fault runs northwest to southeast, roughly parallel to Nishitetsu's Ōmuta train line, and was previously thought to be 22 km (14 mi) long. It is estimated to produce earthquakes as strong as magnitude 7 at the focus approximately once every 15,000 years. If the focus were located at a depth of 10 km (6 mi), this would translate to an earthquake of a lower-6 magnitude (similar to the March 20, 2005 earthquake) in downtown Fukuoka if it were the epicenter. The probability of an earthquake along the known length of the Kego fault occurring within 30 years was estimated at 0.4% prior to the March 20, 2005 earthquake, but this probability has been revised upwards since. Including the new extension out into the Genkai Sea, the Kego fault is now thought to be 40 km (25 mi) long.

Following reports that the city has only prepared for earthquakes up to a magnitude of 6.5, several strong aftershocks renewed fears regarding the portion of the Kego fault that lies under the city, and the potential for an earthquake as big as, or bigger than, the March 20 quake.

=== Wards ===
Fukuoka has 7 wards (ku).

Wards of Fukuoka
	Place Name						Map of Fukuoka
	Rōmaji	Kanji	Color	Population	Land area in km^{2}	Pop. density per km^{2}	
1	Higashi-ku	東区	red	291,749	66.68	4,375.36	A map of Fukuoka's Wards
2	Hakata-ku	博多区	light green	212,108	31.47	6,740.01	A map of Fukuoka's Wards
3	Chūō-ku (administrative center)	中央区	blue	176,739	15.16	11,658.24	A map of Fukuoka's Wards
4	Minami-ku	南区	yellow	248,901	30.98	8,034.25	A map of Fukuoka's Wards
5	Jōnan-ku	城南区	orange	128,883	16.02	8,045.13	A map of Fukuoka's Wards
6	Sawara-ku	早良区	green	211,889	95.88	2,209.42	A map of Fukuoka's Wards
7	Nishi-ku	西区	pink	190,288	83.81	2,270.47	A map of Fukuoka's Wards

== Demographics ==
Historical population
Year	Pop.	±%
1920	239,956	—
1925	274,414	+14.4%
1930	321,276	+17.1%
1935	372,500	+15.9%
1940	398,478	+7.0%
1945	416,332	+4.5%
1950	487,885	+17.2%
1955	591,868	+21.3%
1960	632,365	+6.8%
1965	769,176	+21.6%
1970	871,717	+13.3%
1975	1,002,201	+15.0%
1980	1,088,588	+8.6%
1985	1,160,440	+6.6%
1990	1,237,062	+6.6%
1995	1,284,795	+3.9%
2000	1,341,470	+4.4%
2005	1,401,279	+4.5%
2010	1,463,826	+4.5%
2015	1,538,681	+5.1%
2020	1,603,043	+4.2%

As of November 2018, the city had an estimated population of 1,581,527 and a population density of 4,515.64 inhabitants per square kilometre (11,695.5/sq mi). The total area is 343.39 square kilometres (132.58 sq mi). Fukuoka is Japan's youngest major city and has Japan's fastest growing population. Between December 2012 and December 2017, the proportion of foreign-born residents increased faster than any other major city in Japan, including Tokyo.

There were 171 homeless residents counted in 2018's annual survey, down from a high of 969 in 2009.

As of March 2023, Fukuoka had a population of 1,632,713 with 770,276 males and 862,437 females.

== Economy ==
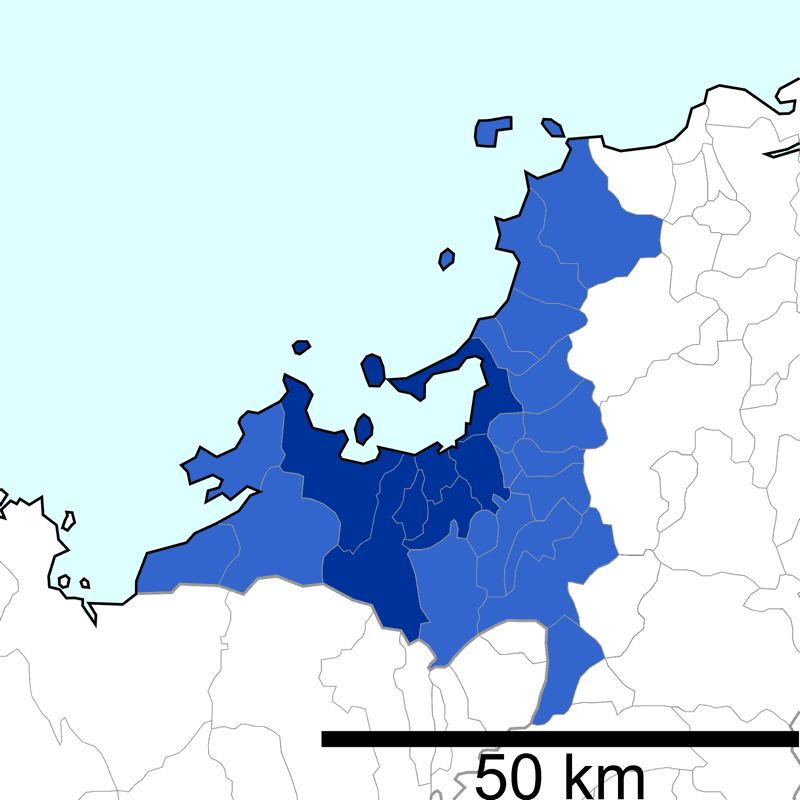
Fukuoka MEA

Fukuoka is the economic center of the Kyushu region, with an economy largely focused on the service sector. It is also the largest startup city in Japan, and is the only economic zone for startups. They have various services for startups like startup visas, tax reductions, and free business consultations. Fukuoka has the highest business-opening rate in Japan. Large companies headquartered in the city include Iwataya and Kyushu Electric Power. Fukuoka is also the home of many small firms playing a supportive role in the logistics, IT, and high-tech manufacturing sectors. Most of the region's heavy manufacturing takes place in the nearby city of Kitakyushu.

The GDP in Greater Fukuoka, Fukuoka Metropolitan Employment Area, was US$101.6 billion in 2010. Fukuoka is the primary economic center of the Fukuoka-Kitakyushu metropolitan area, which is the 4th largest economy in Japan. As of 2014, the area's PPP-adjusted GDP is estimated to be larger than those of metropolitan areas such as Melbourne, Kuala Lumpur, Lima, Vienna, Barcelona and Rome.

Several regional broadcasters are based in the city, including Fukuoka Broadcasting Corporation, Kyushu Asahi Broadcasting, Love FM, RKB Mainichi Broadcasting, and Television Nishinippon Corporation.

The port of Hakata and Fukuoka Airport also make the city a key regional transportation hub. Fukuoka houses the headquarters of Kyushu Railway Company (JR Kyushu) and Nishi-Nippon Railroad. Air Next, a subsidiary of All Nippon Airways, is headquartered in Hakata-ku; prior to its dissolution, Harlequin Air was also headquartered in Hakata-ku.

Fukuoka has its own stock exchange, founded in 1949. It is one of six in Japan.

Fukuoka is one of the most affordable cities in Japan.

== Culture ==
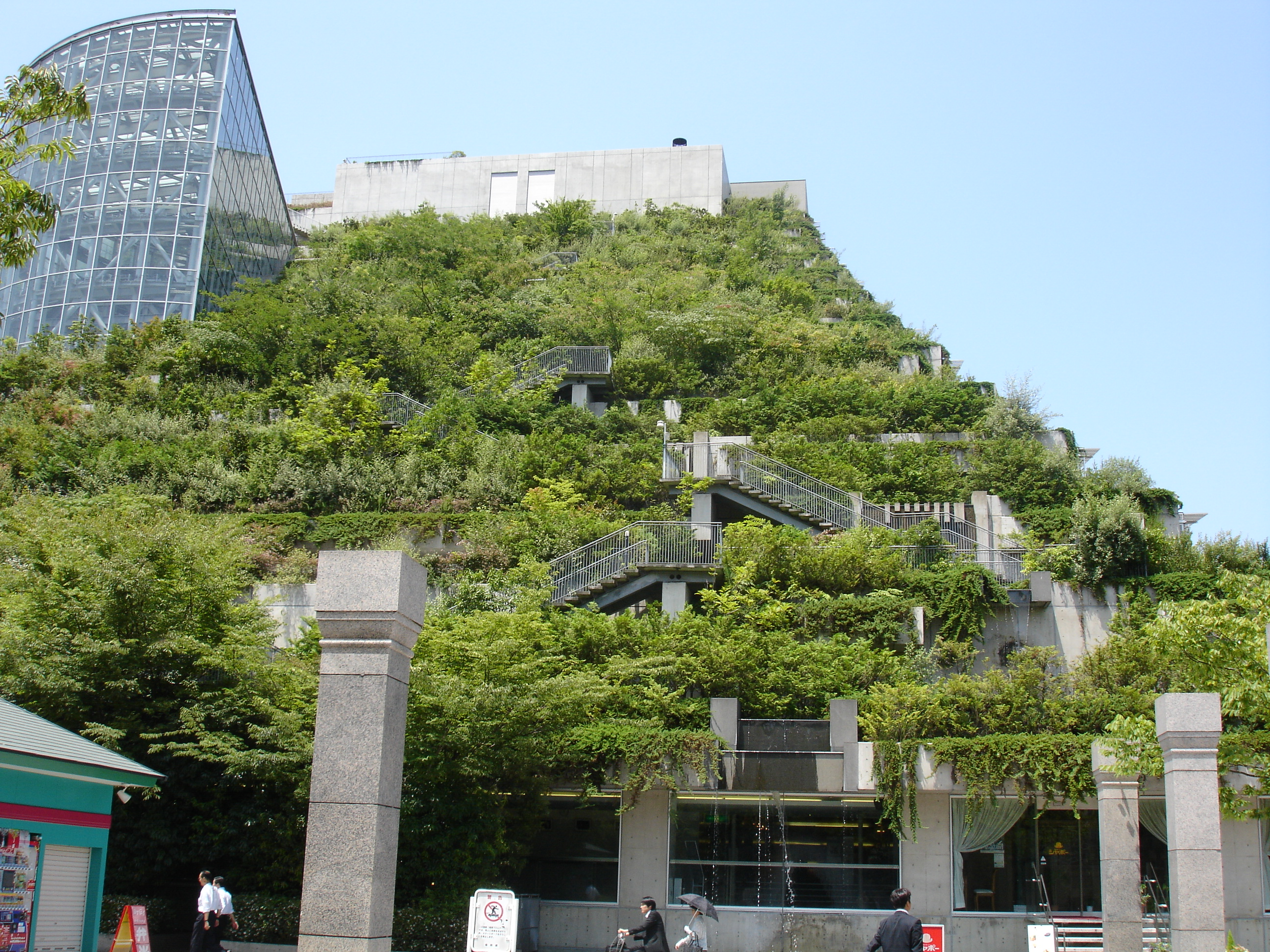
ACROS Fukuoka

Fukuoka was selected as one of Newsweek's 10 "Most Dynamic Cities" in its July 2006 issue. It was chosen for its central Asian location, increasing tourism and trade, and a large increase in volume at its sea and airport. Fukuoka has a diverse culture and a wide range of cultural attractions.

In its July/August 2008 issue, Monocle selected Fukuoka as number 17 of the "Top 25 liveable cities". It was chosen for excellent shopping, outstanding food, good transport links, good museums, "a feeling of openness in its sea air", green spaces and because it is friendly, safe, clean and close to the rest of East Asia. The same survey in 2018 ranked Fukuoka at number 22.

ACROS (Asian Cross Road Over the Sea) is a cultural center located at the Tenjin Central Park. Part of it is the Fukuoka Symphony Hall and it hosts several other cultural events in a green building.

The Fukuoka Asian Culture Prize was established to honor the outstanding work of individuals or organizations in Asia.

=== Tourism ===
Fukuoka hosts more than 2 million foreign visitors annually, with the majority coming from neighboring South Korea, Taiwan and China. From the early 2010s Hakata became the beneficiary of significant growth in cruise ship tourism; particularly with visitors from China. After expansion and redevelopment of the Hakata Port international passenger ship terminal, the number of cruise ship port calls in 2016 was expected to exceed 400.

Nearly ten thousand international students attend universities in or near the Fukuoka prefecture each year. Nearly 200 international conferences are held each year in Fukuoka.

==== Attractions ====
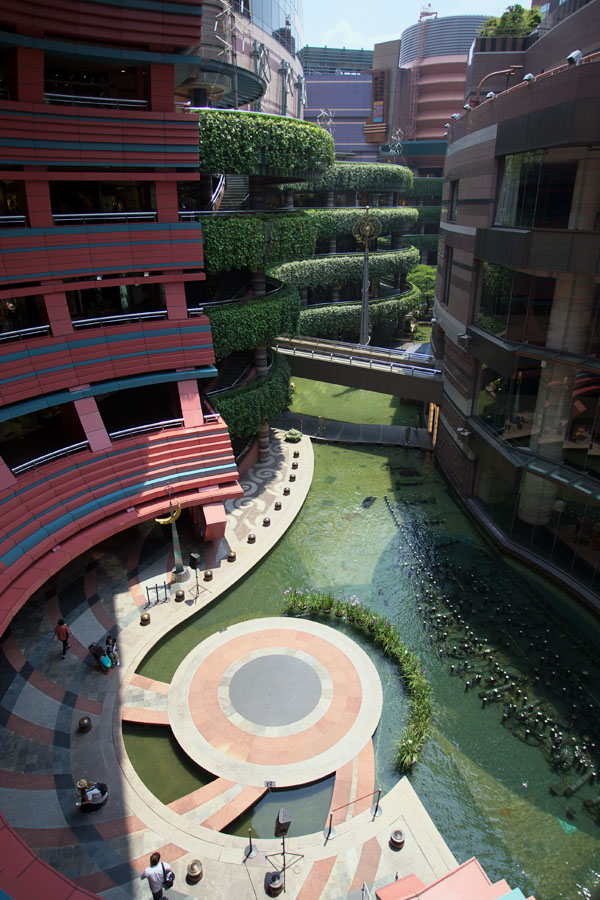
Canal City Hakata

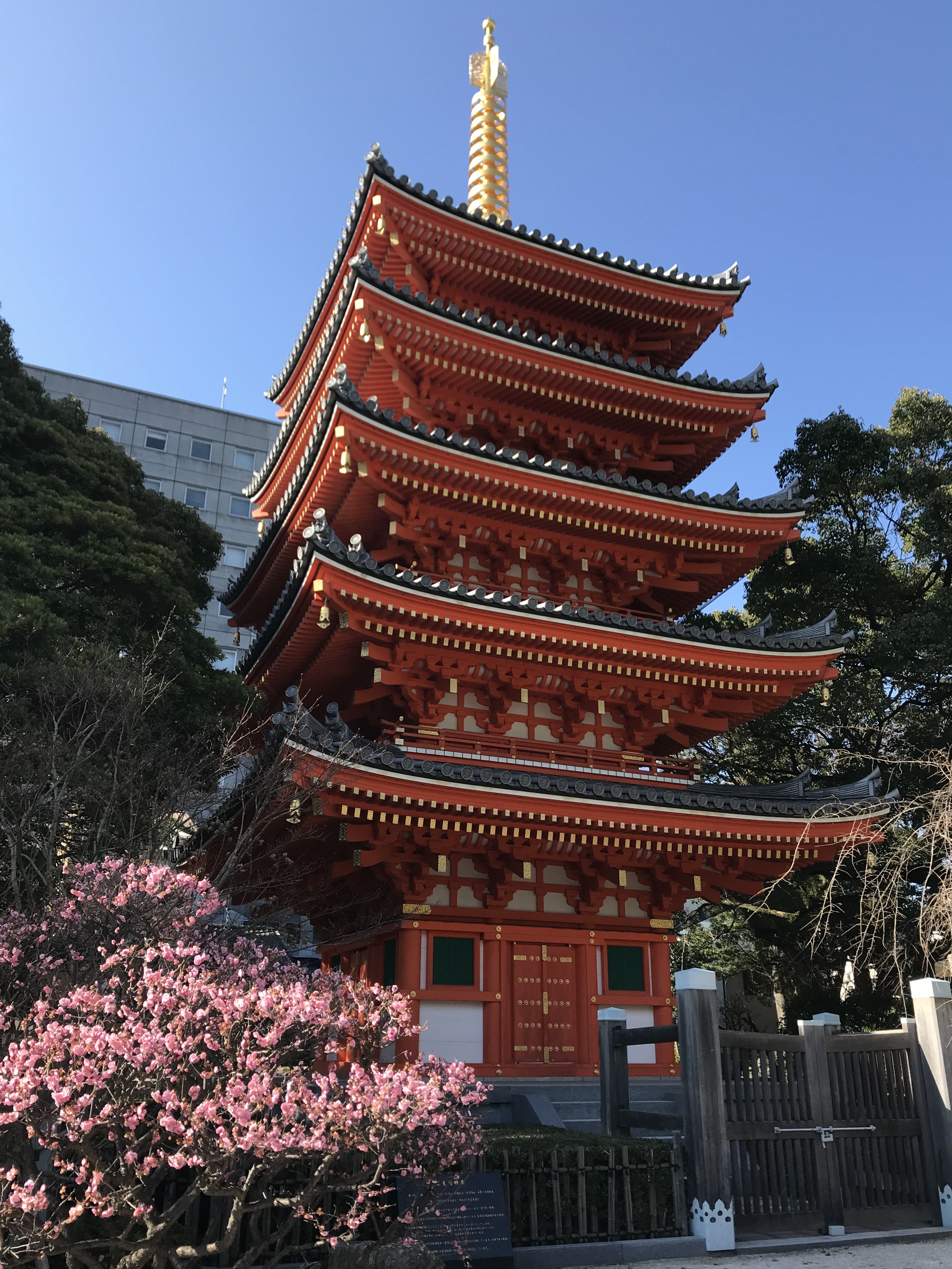
Tōchō-ji

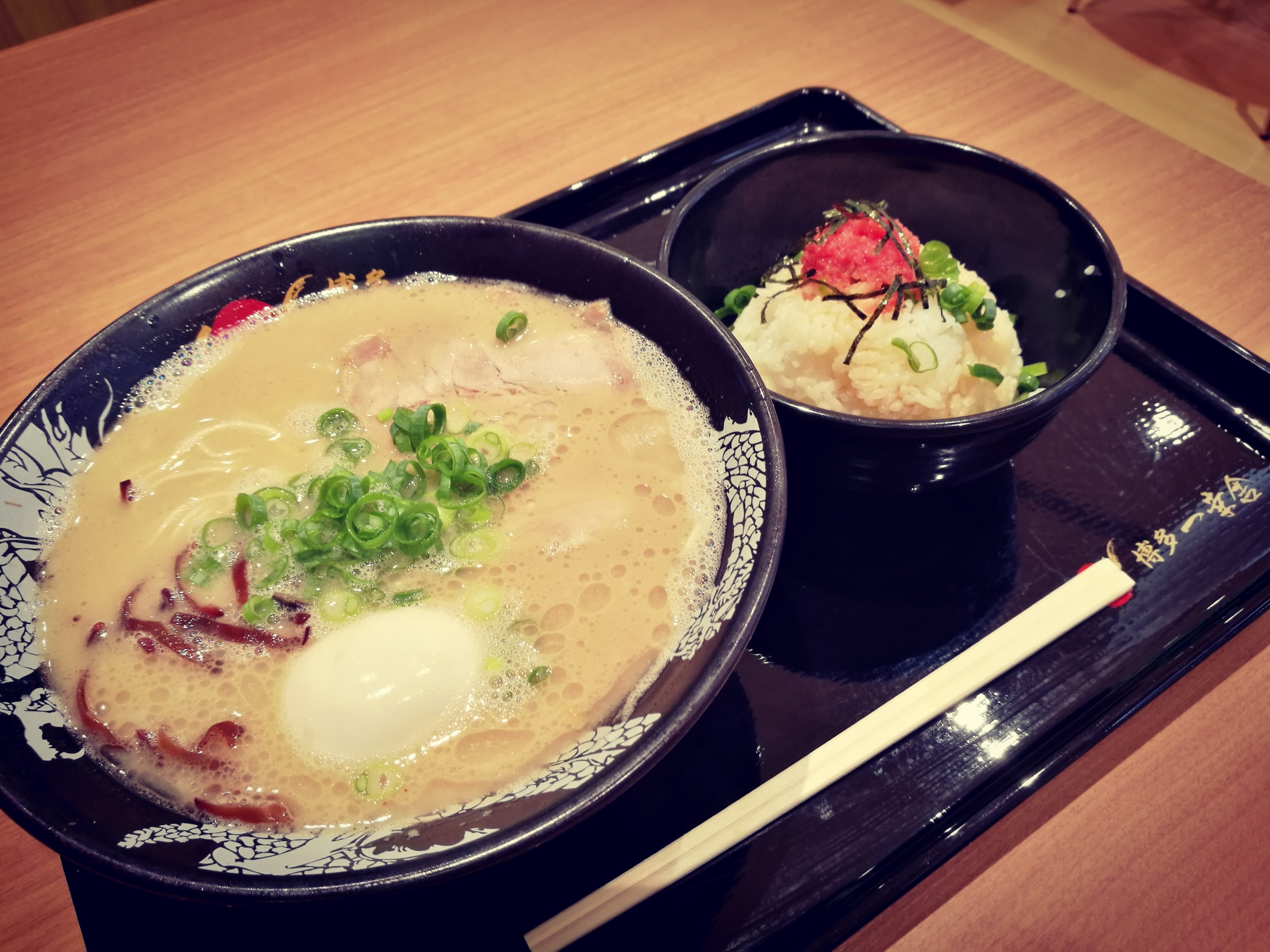
Hakata ramen

Fukuoka Castle, located adjacent to Ohori Park in Maizuru Park, features the remaining stone walls and ramparts left after a devastating fire during the upheaval of the Meiji Restoration. It has now been preserved along with some reconstructed prefabricate concrete towers constructed during the 1950s and 1960s, when there was a trend across Japan to rebuild damaged castles as tourist attractions. Ōhori Park is also the location of one of Fukuoka City's major art galleries.

==== Temples ====
There are many temples with long histories in the city, including Tōchō-ji, Hakozaki Shrine, Kashii shrine, and Jōten-ji. The 19th century Buddhist Nanzoin temple, located towards the east of Fukuoka, was founded in 1899 and is claimed to be the largest statue of a reclining Buddha in the world.

==== Other attractions ====
Sky Dream Fukuoka, in Fukuoka's western ward, was a Ferris wheel with a height of 120 meters and was closed in September 2009. The surrounding shopping center, Marinoa City Fukuoka, still attracts millions of visitors each year. Other shopping centers that attract tourists include Canal City, JR Hakata City, and Hakata Riverain.

The Marine Park Uminonakamichi is located on a narrow cape on the northern side of the Bay of Hakata. The park has an amusement park, petting zoo, gardens, beaches, a hotel, and a large marine aquarium which opened in 1989.

For tourists from other parts of Japan, local foods such as mentaiko, Hakata (tonkotsu) ramen, and motsunabe are associated with Fukuoka. Yatai (street stalls) serving ramen can be found in Tenjin and Nakasu most evenings.

Fukuoka Tower is near the beach in Seaside Momochi, a development built for the 1989 Asia-Pacific Exhibition. The older symbol of the city, Hakata Port Tower, is next to the international ferry terminal and is free to enter.

Itoshima, to the west of Fukuoka city, has recently become a very popular tourist destination. There are many beaches along the coast, notably Futamigaura beach, where there is a famous Shinto shrine in the ocean, and Keya beach, which hosts the annual Sunset Live festival every September. Inland, there is the Shingon Buddhist temple called Raizan Sennyoji, where there are many Buddhist statues and stunning autumn foliage.

=== Museums ===
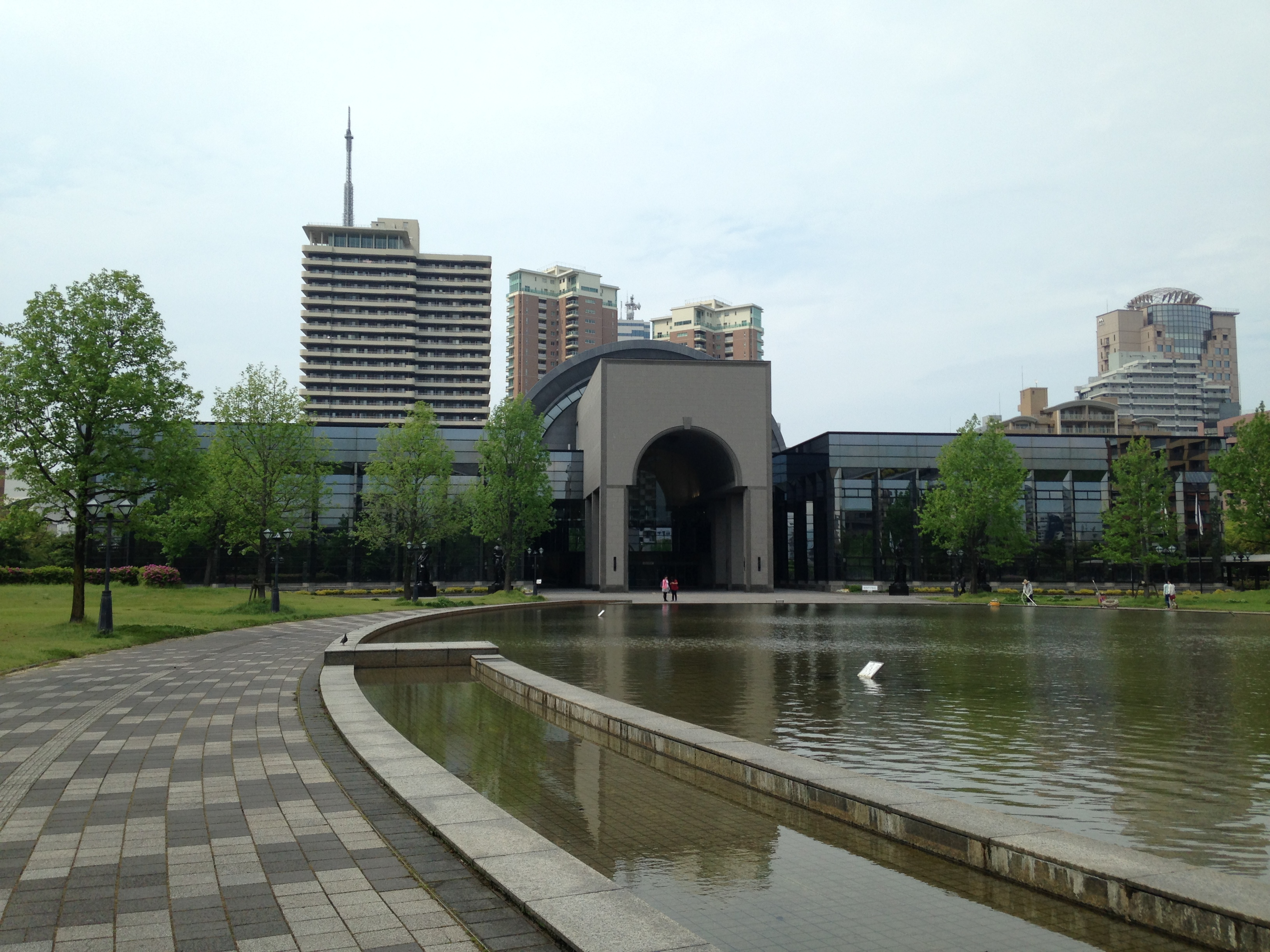
Fukuoka City Museum

- Fukuoka Art Museum – In Ohori Park; contains a wide selection of contemporary and other art from around the world, including works by Mark Rothko, Roy Lichtenstein, and Salvador Dalí.
- Fukuoka Asian Art Museum – contains art from various countries of Asia.
- Fukuoka City Museum – displays a broad range of items from the region's history, including a spectacular gold seal.
- Fukuoka Oriental Ceramics Museum
- Fukuoka Prefectural Museum of Art
- Genko Historical Museum (元寇史料館, Museum of the Mongol Invasion) – In Higashi Koen (Eastern Park); displays Japanese and Mongolian arms and armor from the 13th century as well as paintings on historical subjects. Open on weekends.
- Hakata Machiya Folk Museum – Dedicated to displaying the traditional ways of life, speech, and culture of the Fukuoka region.
- Kyushu National Museum in nearby Dazaifu.

=== Festivals ===
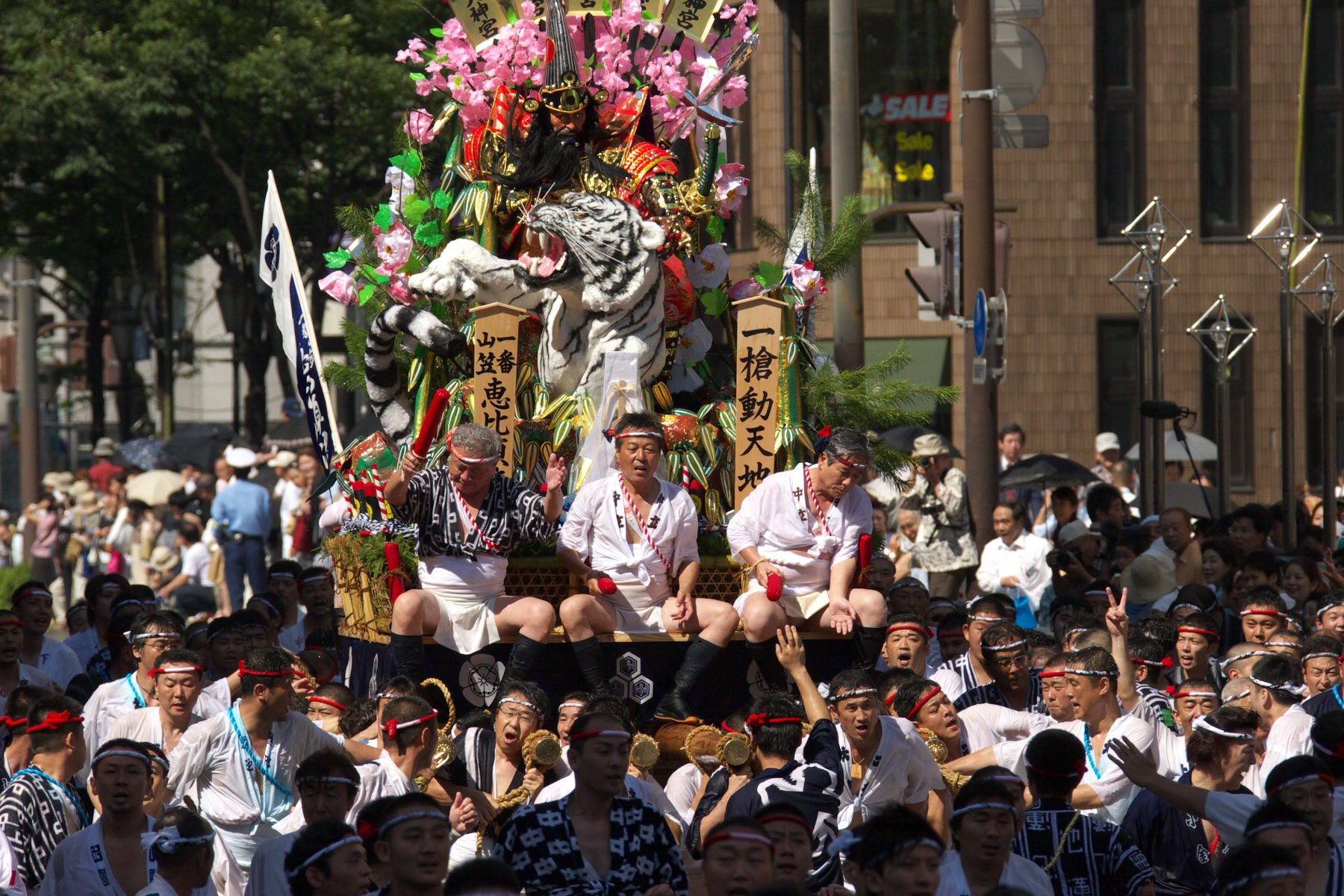
Hakata Gion Yamakasa

Fukuoka is home to many festivals (matsuri) that are held throughout the year. Of these, the most famous are Hakata Dontaku and Hakata Gion Yamakasa.

==== Yamakasa ====
Yamakasa (山笠), held for two weeks each July, is Fukuoka's oldest festival with a history of over 700 years. The festival dates back to 1241 when a priest called Shioichu Kokushi saved Hakata from a terrible plague by being carried around the city on a movable shrine and throwing water. Teams of men (no women, except small girls, are allowed), representing different districts in the city, commemorate the priest's route by racing against the clock around a set course carrying on their shoulders floats weighing several thousand pounds. Participants all wear shimekomi (called fundoshi in other parts of Japan), which are traditional loincloths.

Each day of the two-week festival is marked by special events and practice runs, culminating in the official race that takes place the last morning before dawn. Tens of thousands line the streets to cheer on the teams. During the festival, men can be seen walking around many parts of Fukuoka in long happi coats bearing the distinctive mark of their team affiliation and traditional geta sandals. The costumes are worn with pride and are considered appropriate wear for even formal occasions, such as weddings and cocktail parties, during the festival.

==== Hakata Dontaku ====
Hakata Dontaku (博多どんたく) is held in Fukuoka City on May 3 and 4. Boasting over 800 years of history, Dontaku is attended by more than 2 million people, making it the festival with the highest attendance during Japan's Golden Week holidays. During the festival, stages are erected throughout downtown for traditional performances and a parade of floats is held. The full name is Hakata Dontaku Minato Matsuri.

The festival was stopped for seven years during the Meiji era. Since it was restarted in the 12th year of the Meiji era it has been known as Hakata Dontaku.

=== Music ===
Notable musical names in J-pop include Ayumi Hamasaki (allegedly Japan's richest woman), hugely popular singer-songwriter duo Chage & Aska, singer-songwriter Eri Nobuchika, Misia, and Yui. During the 1970s, local musicians prided themselves on their origins and dubbed their sound, Mentai Rock.

Morning Musume 6th generation member Reina Tanaka was also born here in 1989 along with 9th generation member Erina Ikuta in 1997.

Dominican songwriter and singer Juan Luis Guerra pays homage to the city in his bachata song Bachata en Fukuoka (2010).

HKT48 have their own Theater at Nishitetsu Hall.

Ezaki Hikaru of the k-pop group Kep1er was born in Fukuoka.

Rock band Number Girl is from Fukuoka, often stating "福岡市博多区からやって参りました、NUMBER GIRLです" between live performances of songs, which translates to "From Fukuoka City, Hakata Ward, we are Number Girl". All members except for Mukai Shutoku are from Fukuoka Prefecture.

== Transport ==
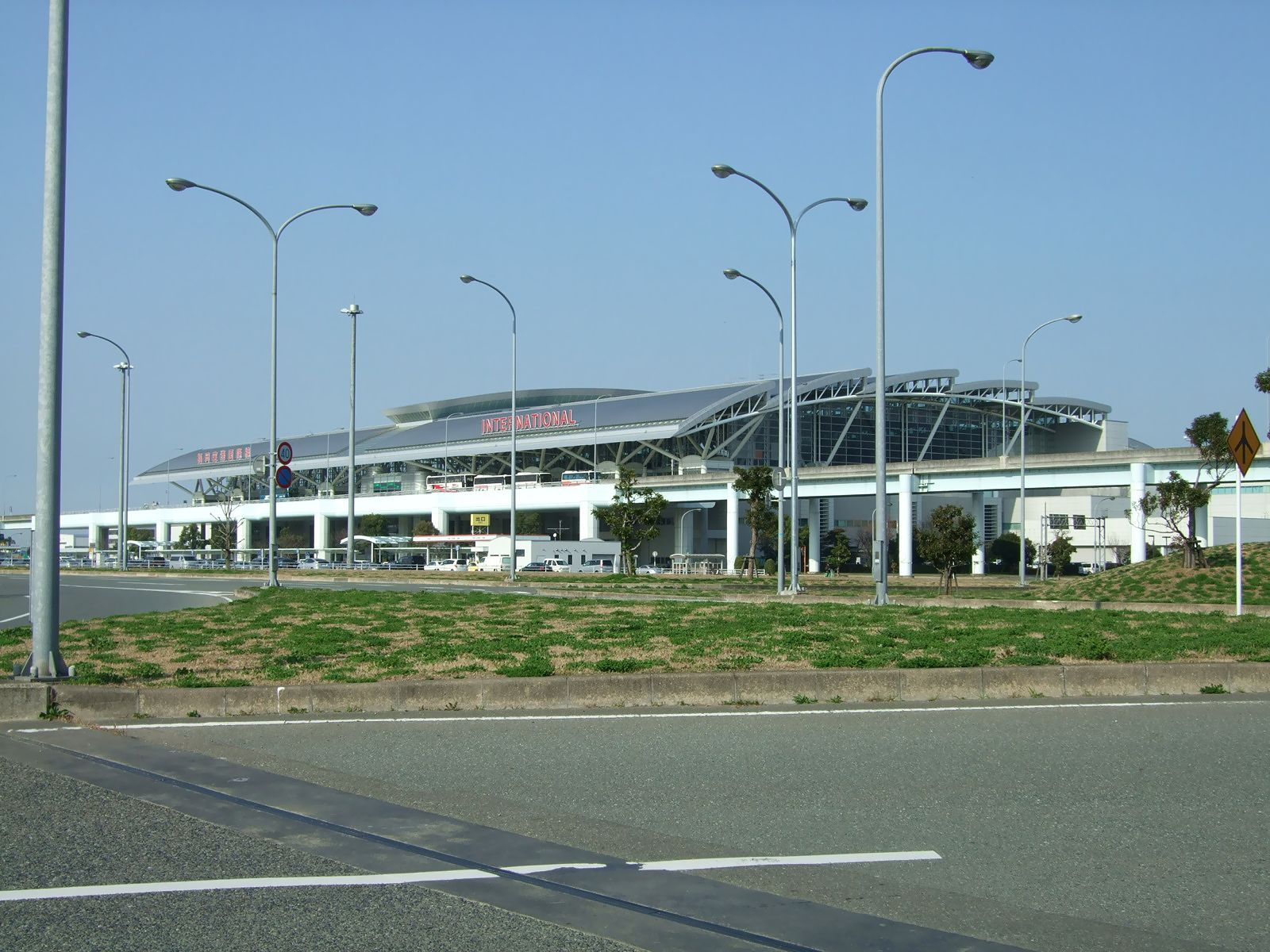
International terminal of Fukuoka Airport

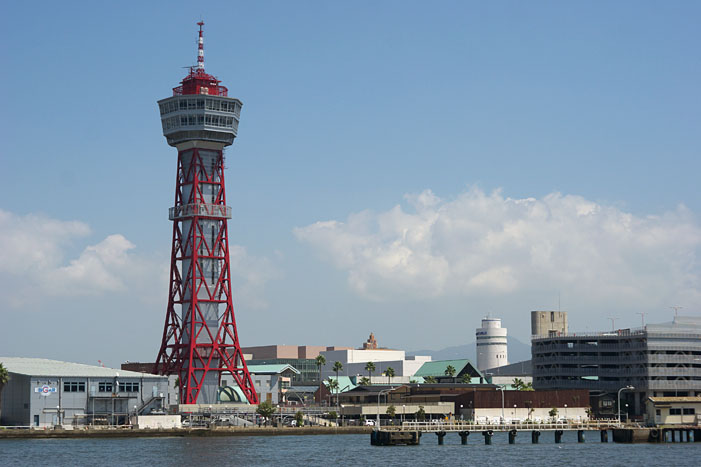
Bayside Place Hakata Port

Fukuoka is served by Fukuoka Airport, the San'yō Shinkansen and the Kyushu Shinkansen high-speed rail line and other JR Kyushu trains at Hakata Station and by ferry. JR Kyushu and a Korean company operate hydrofoil ferries (named Beetle and Kobee) between Hakata and Busan, South Korea. The city has three subway lines: the Airport Line, the Hakozaki Line, and the newest one, Subway Nanakuma Line, opened on February 2, 2005. A private railway line, run by Nishitetsu is also heavily used and connects the downtown area of Tenjin to the city of Ōmuta.

== Sports ==
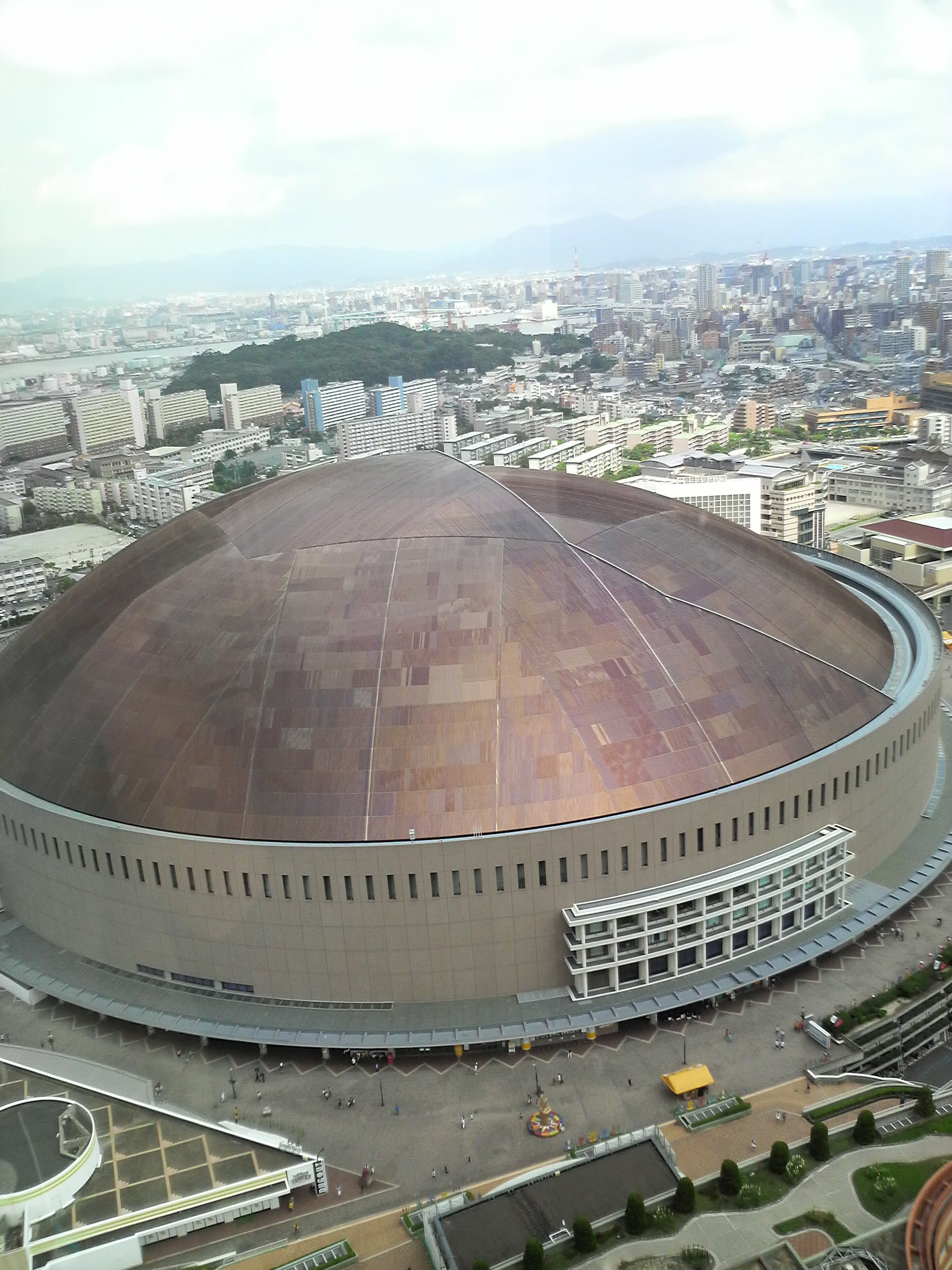
Fukuoka PayPay Dome

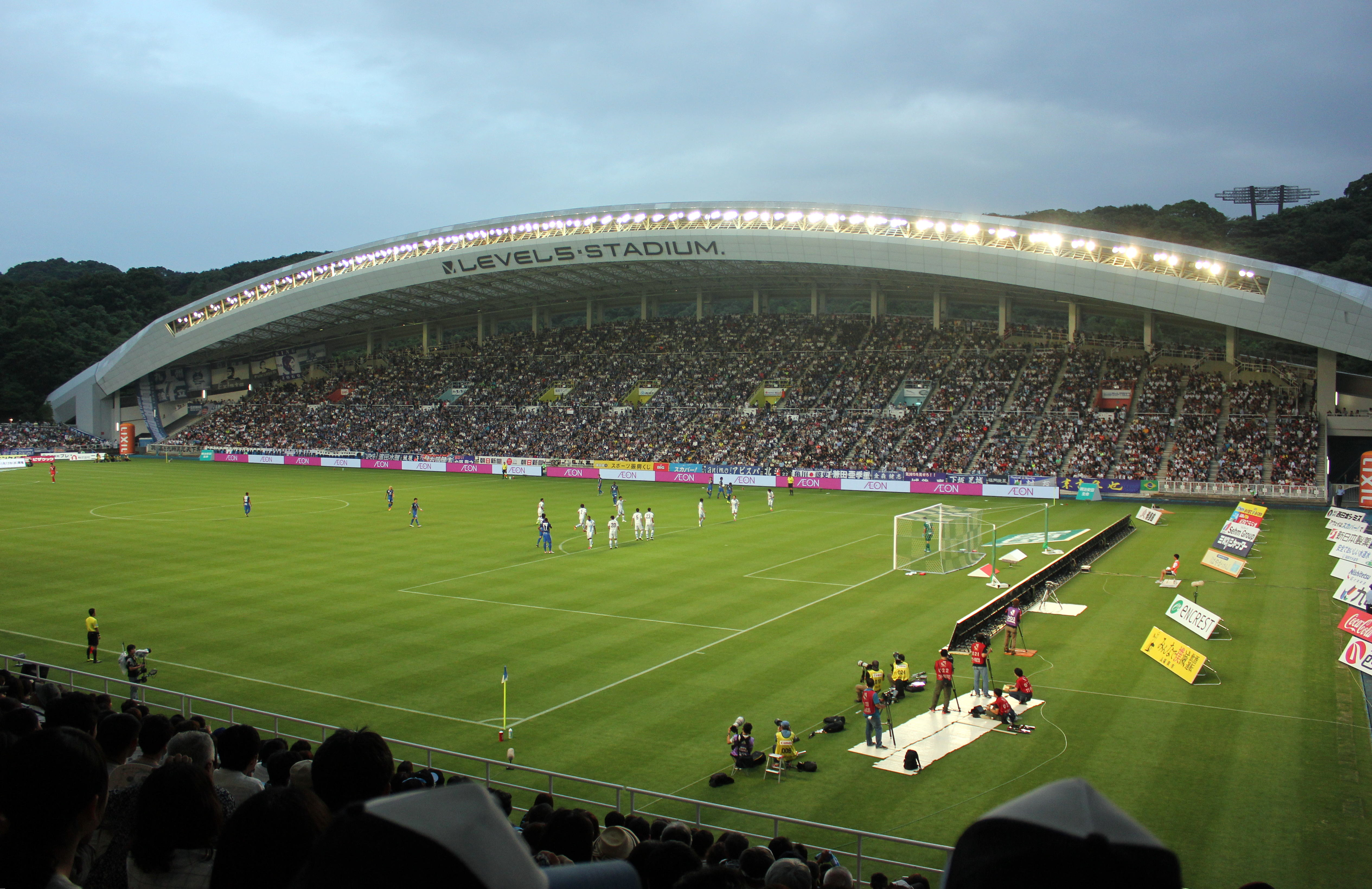
Level-5 Stadium

Fukuoka is the home of the Fukuoka SoftBank Hawks, one of Japan's top professional baseball teams. Threatened with bankruptcy and forced by its creditors to restructure, former owner Daiei sold the Hawks to Softbank Group during the 2004 NPB realignment. After the sale to Softbank, the Hawks have become one of the most successful teams in NPB, winning 6 Japan Series titles in 8 years across the 2010s. Their home stadium is the Mizuho PayPay Dome Fukuoka.

Fukuoka is home to a professional football team, Avispa Fukuoka.

Annual sporting events include:

- The All Japan Judo Category Championships are held in early April.
- The Kyushu ekiden, beginning in Nagasaki and ending in Fukuoka, the world's longest relay race, held in October. (Defunct)
- The November tournament of professional Sumo is held at the Fukuoka Kokusai Center.

Fukuoka has hosted the following sporting events:

- Fukuoka Marathon from 1947 through 2021.
- 1983 Asian Volleyball Championship for Women
- 1995 Summer Universiade
- 1997 Pan Pacific Swimming Championships
- 1998 Women's Volleyball World Championship
- 1999 Asian Basketball Championship
- 2001 World Aquatics Championships.
- 2006 IAAF World Cross Country Championships.
- Fukuoka International Women's Judo Championships from 1983 to 2006.
- 2013–14 Grand Prix of Figure Skating Final
- 2023 World Aquatics Championships

=== Sports teams and facilities ===
Club	Sports	League	Venue	Established
Kyuden Voltex	Rugby	Top League	Level-5 Stadium	1951
Coca-Cola Red Sparks	Rugby	Top League	Sawayaka Sports Park	1966
Fukuoka SoftBank Hawks	Baseball	Pacific League	Fukuoka PayPay Dome	1989 (year of relocation from Ōsaka as Daiei Hawks, changed to current name from 2005)
Avispa Fukuoka	Association football	J. League	Level-5 Stadium	1995 (year of relocation from Fujieda, Shizuoka as Fukuoka Blux, changed to current name from 1996)
Fukuoka J-Anclas	Association football	Nadeshiko League	Level-5 Stadium	1986 (as Fukuoka Jogakuin High School football club, changed to a senior club team and participated Nadeshiko League Div. 2 from 2006)
Rizing Zephyr Fukuoka	Basketball	B.League	Accion Fukuoka	2007
Fukuoka Suns	American football	X-League	Hakata-ku, Fukuoka	2017

== Education ==
Fukuoka City operates all public elementary and junior high schools, while the prefecture operates the high schools.

National universities

- Kyushu University (九州大学, Kyushu Daigaku)
  - Kyushu Institute of Design (九州芸術工科大学, Kyushu Geijutsu Kōka Daigaku) – merged with Kyushu University in October 2003

Prefectural university

- Fukuoka Women's University (福岡女子大学, Fukuoka Joshi Daigaku)

Private universities

- Daiichi University, College of Pharmaceutical Sciences (第一薬科大学, Daiichi Yakka Daigaku)
- Fukuoka Institute of Technology (福岡工業大学, Fukuoka Kōgyō Daigaku)
- Fukuoka Jo Gakuin University (福岡女学院大学, Fukuoka Jogakuin Daigaku)
- Fukuoka University (福岡大学, Fukuoka Daigaku)
- Kyushu Sangyo University (九州産業大学, Kyushu Sangyō Daigaku)
- Nakamura Gakuen University (中村学園大学, Nakamura Gakuen Daigaku)
- Seinan Gakuin University (西南学院大学, Seinan Gakuin Daigaku)

Colleges

- Fukuoka College of Health Sciences (福岡医療短期大学, Fukuoka Iryō Tanki Daigaku)
- Fukuoka Institute of Technology, Junior college (福岡工業大学短期大学部, Fukuoka Kōgyō Daigaku Tanki Daigakubu)
- Junshin Junior College (純真短期大学, Junshin Tanki Daigaku)
- Koran Women's Junior College (香蘭女子短期大学, Kōran Joshi Tanki Daigaku)
- Kyushu Zokei Art College (九州造形短期大学, Kyushu Zōkei Tanki Daigaku)
- Nakamura Gakuen Junior College (中村学園大学短期大学部, Nakamura Gakuen Daigaku Tanki Daigakubu)
- Nishinihon Junior College (西日本短期大学, Nishi Nihon Tanki Daigaku)
- Seika Women's Junior College (精華女子短期大学, Seika Joshi Tanki Daigaku)

Catholic schools

- Sophia Fukuoka Junior and Senior High School

== Sister cities ==
Fukuoka has ten sister cities.

- Oakland, CA, United States, since October 1962
- Guangzhou, China, since February 1979
- Bordeaux, Nouvelle-Aquitaine, France, since November 1982
- Naples, Campania, Italy, since October 1983
- Auckland, New Zealand, since June 1986
- Ipoh, Perak, Malaysia, since March 1989
- Qingdao, Shandong, China, since February 2003
- Atlanta, GA, United States, since February 2005
- Busan, South Korea, since February 2007
- Delhi, India, friendship city since November 2007
- Yangon, Myanmar, since December 2016

The city established the Asian Pacific City Summit in 1994. It consists of 26 Asia-Pacific cities. The Asian Pacific Children's Convention was established in Fukuoka in 1988.

== Notable people ==
- Jirō Akagawa, novelist
- Aska (singer) (Chage and Aska)
- Sonny Chiba, actor, singer, film producer, film director and martial artist
- Kaibara Ekken, Neo-Confucianist philosopher
- Chiya Fujino, writer
- Noriko Fukuda, TV announcer
- Kenji Hamada, voice actor
- Ayumi Hamasaki, Japan's best selling solo artist in history
- Angela Harry, model and actress
- Kanna Hashimoto, actress, singer and former idol
- Hazuki, professional joshi wrestler
- Riko Higashio, professional golfer
- Kiyoshi Hikawa, enka singer
- Kōki Hirota, politician: 32nd Prime Minister of Japan
- HKT48, idol group
- Yōsuke Ideguchi, footballer
- Hiroe Igeta, model, actress and tarento
- Elaiza Ikeda, model and actress
- Sosuke Ikematsu, movie actor, television actor and theatre actor
- Erina Ikuta, J-pop singer and member of Morning Musume
- Mio Imada, actress and model
- Tomo Inouye, medical doctor
- Takumi Iroha, professional wrestler
- Ryo Ishibashi, actor and musician
- Sui Ishida, manga artist
- Gakuryū Ishii, film director
- Kanikapila, rock band
- Ai Kawashima, singer-songwriter
- Ren Kawashiri, J-pop singer/dancer, member of JO1
- Yoshinori Kobayashi, manga artist
- Masamune Kusano, vocalist of Spitz
- Yumeno Kyūsaku, novelist
- Maika, professional joshi
- Misia, J-pop singer
- Kento Miyahara, professional wrestler
- Yume Miyamoto, actress and voice actress
- Seiji Naito, urologist
- Ryutaro Nakahara, DJ, musician, composer and arranger
- Kenzo Nakamura, Judo athlete
- Katsuhiko Nakajima, professional wrestler
- Ai Nonaka, voice actress
- Kenshō Ono, voice actor
- Wakana Ootaki, singer, member of Kalafina
- Yukari Oshima, actress
- Victoria Principal, American actress
- Juufuutei Raden, VTuber
- Moka Sakai, K-pop Idol, girl group Illit
- Noriko Sakai, singer and actress
- Nao Sakuma, principal dancer with Birmingham Royal Ballet
- Kensuke Sasaki, professional wrestler
- Sayuri, singer-songwriter
- Kōji Seto, actor
- Eihi Shiina, model and actress
- Ringo Shiina, J-pop singer born in Saitama Prefecture and raised in Fukuoka
- Harukichi Shimoi, writer, translator, and participant in the Fiume endeavor
- Kōji Shiraishi, horror film director
- Polkadot Stingray, rock band
- Keita Tachibana, J-pop singer and member of W-inds
- Takehiro Tomiyasu, footballer
- Akitomo Takeno, basketball player
- Dan Takuma, businessman
- Tamori, TV presenter
- Kane Tanaka, oldest verified Japanese person ever and second oldest verified person ever
- Reina Tanaka, J-pop singer and a member of Morning Musume and Lovendor
- Ryoko Tani, judo athlete
- Rintaro Tokunaga, basketball player
- Kohei Uchimura, artistic gymnast
- Misa Uehara (1937–2003), actress
- Ryutaro Umeno, baseball player
- Kappei Yamaguchi, actor/voice actor and rakugoka
- Masaaki Yuasa, director
- Yui, singer
- Haruto Watanabe, K-pop Idol, boy group Treasure (band)

== See also ==
- 2006 Fukuoka mayoral election
- List of Places of Scenic Beauty of Japan (Fukuoka)
- List of Historic Sites of Japan (Fukuoka)
