= Hakata Port Tower =

Observation tower in Fukuoka, Japan

Coordinates: 33°36′15.6″N 130°23′51.9″E

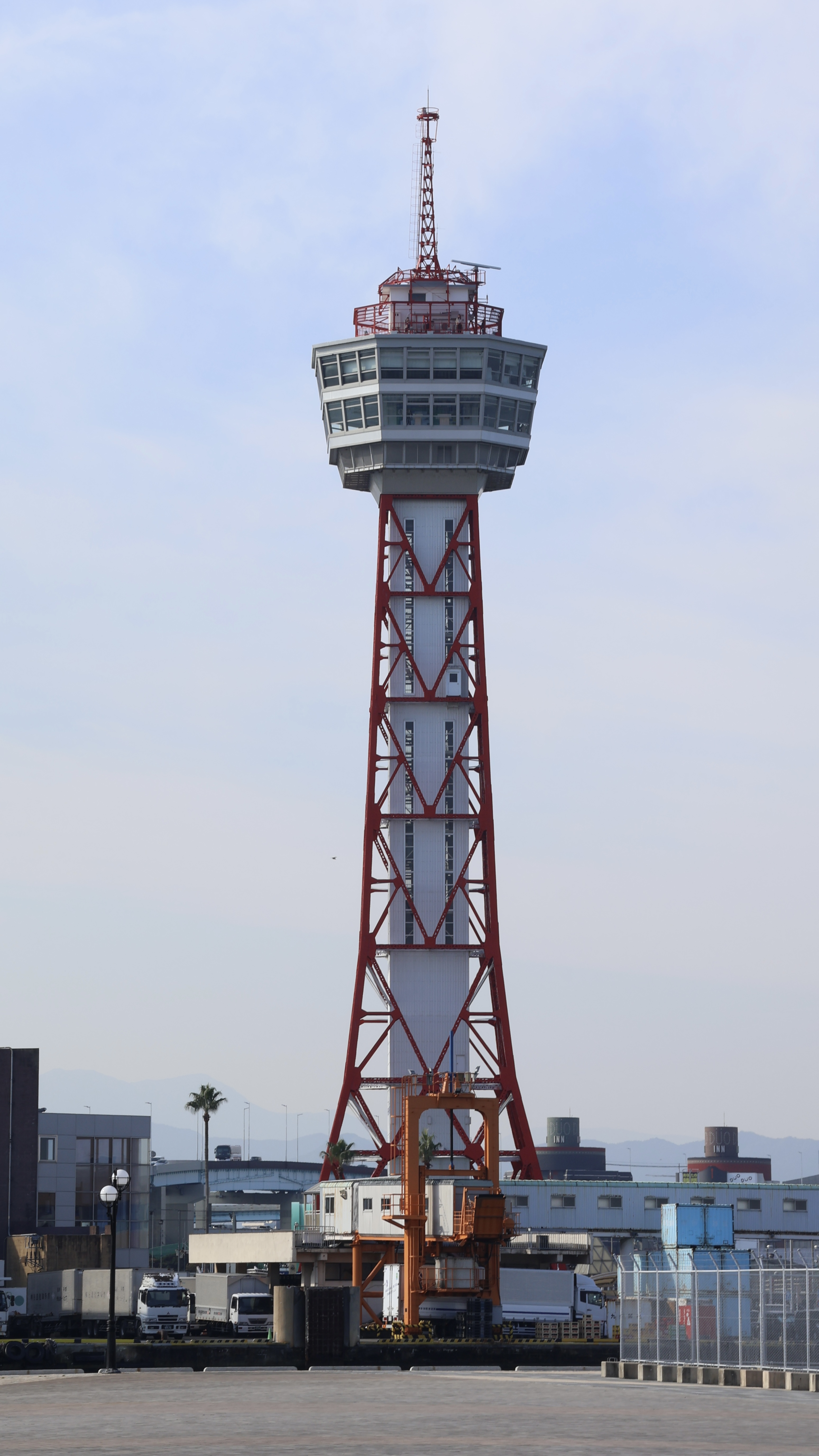
The Hakata Port Tower in 2024

Hakata Port Tower is a 103 metre high lattice tower with an observation deck in a height of 73.5 metres in Hakata-ku, Fukuoka, Japan. Hakata Port Tower was built in 1964.

== See also ==
- Hakata Port
