= Tokugawa Ieyasu's Clock =

Oldest surviving clock in Japan

- 徳川家康の洋時計 (Japanese)
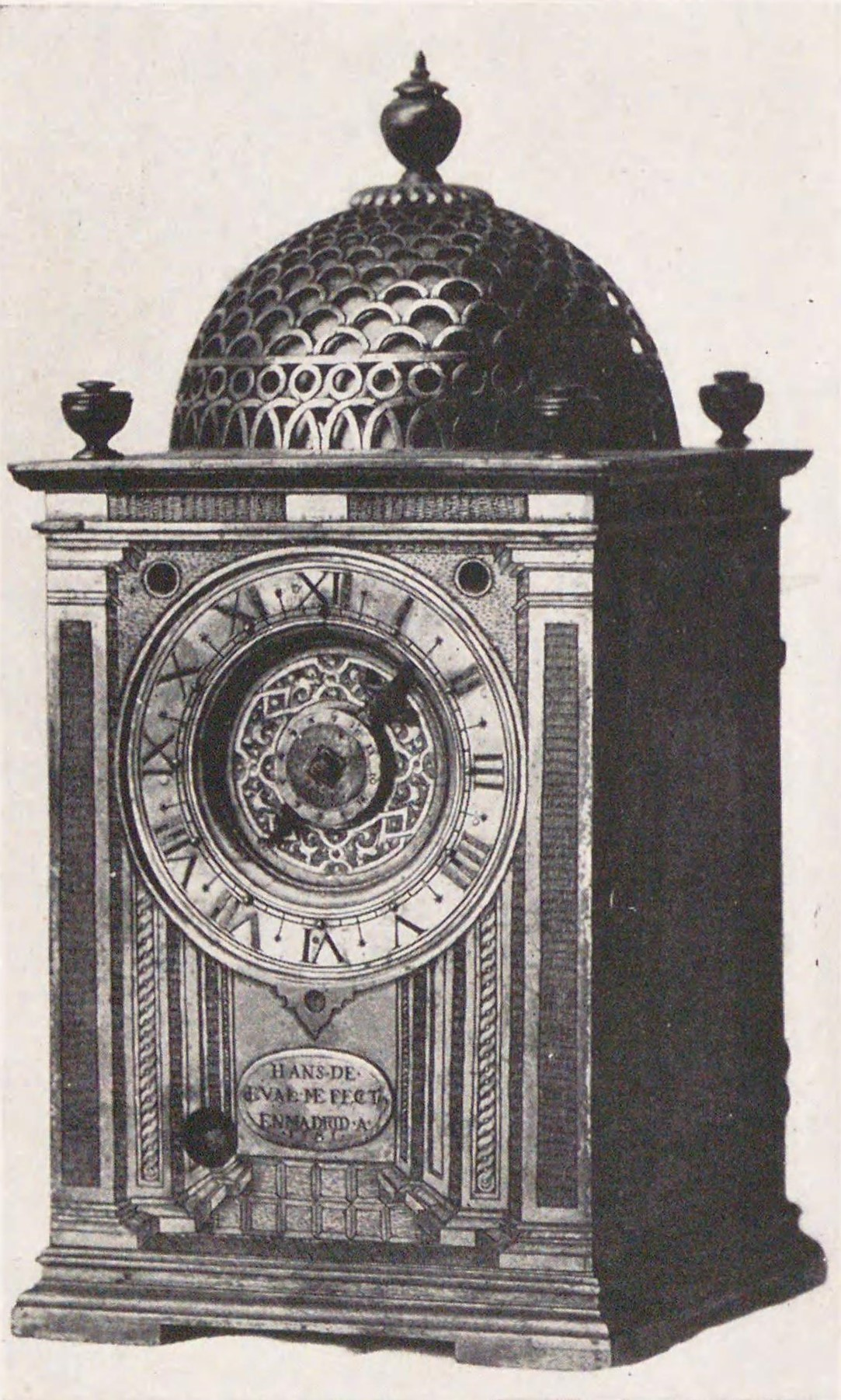
- Tokugawa Ieyasu's Clock stored at Kunōzan Tōshō-gū
- Artist: Nicolaus de Troestenberch or Hans de Evalo
- Year: 1573 or 1581
- Type: Clock
- Medium: Bronze, silver, brass
- Dimensions: 21.5 cm × 10.6 cm (8.5 in × 4.2 in)
- Designation: Important Cultural Property (1979)
- Location: Kunōzan Tōshō-gū Museum; Shizuoka
- Owner: Kunōzan Tōshō-gū

Tokugawa Ieyasu's Clock (Japanese: 徳川家康の洋時計, Tokugawa Ieyasu no yōdokei) is a clock which was given to Shogun Tokugawa Ieyasu of Japan by King Philip III of Spain in 1611. Built in 1573 or 1581, the clock is the oldest surviving clock in Japan and one of the few surviving clocks in the world of its era. Since Ieyasu's death, the clock has been stored at Kunōzan Tōshō-gū, and has since been designated as an Important Cultural Property with application to designate it as a National Treasure in Japan under consideration. A 2012 examination by the British Museum concluded that the clock is likely the only clock in the world of its era in which almost all of the internal parts remain as they were originally made.

== History ==
=== Manufacturing ===
The clock is a gilt-bronze spring-loaded clock which, according to the nameplate on the clock, was manufactured in Madrid, Spain, in 1581 by Hans de Evalo. De Evalo was a Flemish man born in Brussels and was a master clockmaker to King Philip II from 1580 until his death in 1598. The Spanish royalty had been avid collectors of clocks since the reign of Charles V, and the oldest surviving clock in their collection was also made by de Evalo. Another inscription was later discovered on the clock, naming Nicolaus de Troestenberch as its maker. Nicolaus de Troestenberch was a royal clockmaker to Charles V, and was the son of Jean van Troestenberch, royal clockmaker to Philip I of Castile in the early 16th century.

Nothing is known about the clock from the time it was made to the time it was presented to Tokugawa Ieyasu.

=== Arrival in Japan ===
On September 30, 1609, Philippine Governor Rodrigo de Vivero, 1st Count of Valle de Orizaba was on board a ship which was heading from the Philippines to Mexico (New Spain) when it was caught in a storm near Japan and drifted ashore in the village of Iwawada in Ōtaki Domain, Kazusa Province (present-day Onjuku, Chiba Prefecture). Local villagers succeeded in rescuing 317 of the 373 sailors on board. Local divers are said to have rescued drowning sailors from the sea and revived them with body heat. The crew was later sheltered at the Ōtaki Castle and the Iwaida Grand Shrine at the discretion of Honda Tadatomo, lord of Ōtaki Castle.

Tokugawa Ieyasu sent his diplomatic advisor and translator Miura Anjin (William Adams) to Iwawada and ordered him to protect de Vivero and his crew. Honda Tadatomo met with de Vivero, and gave him kimono, tachi swords, cows, chickens, fruit, and sake. Tadatomo provided the ship's crew with food for 40 days until a decision was made on their treatment.

Rodrigo de Vivero met Tokugawa Hidetada in Edo and Tokugawa Ieyasu in Sunpu. Ieyasu, as temporary ambassador to Spain, held discussions on trade, and offered to provide de Vivero and others with Western-style ships and travel expenses on the condition that they send mining engineers from Mexico. Ieyasu ordered Miura Anjin to build two Western-style ships and ordered Tanaka Shōsuke and 21 other Japanese merchants to transport de Vivero and his party to Mexico on these ships. The ships set sail from Uraga on June 13, 1610 and arrived in Mexico on October 23.

In May 1611, King Philip III of Spain and Luis de Velasco, 1st Marquess of Salinas del Río Pisuerga, the Viceroy of New Spain, dispatched Commander Sebastián Vizcaíno to Japan. Vizcaíno's mission was to thank Ieyasu for the rescue, discover the "gold and silver islands", mythical islands rich in silver and gold believed to be near Japan, to return the gold coins on loan from Ieyasu, and to send Japanese merchants back home. Vizcaíno met Ieyasu in Sunpu in July 1611, delivering gifts and a letter from the king and viceroy to Ieyasu. Among these gifts was a Western-style clock. Ieyasu's foreign advisor Ishin Sūden recorded "one clock" in the gift catalog in Ikoku Nikki.

Ieyasu liked the clock very much and displayed it in his room, but did not use it as a clock because it differed from the Japanese calendar system.

The clock was never used or its parts replaced, and it was stored as a sacred treasure at Kunōzan Tōshō-gū in present-day Shizuoka, Shizuoka Prefecture after Ieyasu's death in 1616.

=== Restoration ===
On June 10, 1948, Time Day in Japan, the Japan Broadcasting Corporation (NHK) introduced the sound of the clock striking to the nation for the first time in a radio broadcast. However, when Teiichi Asahina visited Tōshō-gū in the spring following the broadcast to check the actual clock, he found that the iron parts had considerable red rust and the oil had run out, rendering it inoperable. Hearing that the previous year's broadcast had been recorded by ringing the clock manually rather than by running the clock, Asahina repeatedly urged that Tōshō-gū take care of it.

As a result, the maintenance of the clock was decided to take place in both 1953 and 1954, around April 17, the anniversary of Ieyasu's death and the day of the Grand Festival. This date was chosen to coincide with Iemasa Tokugawa's visit to the shrine. All work was carried out inside Tōshō-gū as the shrine policy requires all treasures be kept out of public sight.

During the restoration, clockmakers such as Sugijirō Isada of Tokyo and Namijirō Ishizu of Hamamatsu worked without pay, and the clock began to run again. NHK broadcast the sound of the clock ticking and striking nationwide on the evening news on April 18, 1953. In 1955, on Time Day, the House of Councillors Chairman Yahachi Kawai, who attended the annual festival, suggested that the clock be set to ring with a sister clock in Spain. Asahina and others approached the Spanish Embassy and exchanged tapes with each other, which were broadcast on June 10 in both countries.

=== Modern times ===
In November 1955, the clock was stolen along with 12 other treasures from the exhibition hall during the night between the 19th and 20th. The incident was covered by a foreign clock magazine. On the night of February 1, 1956, the clock was wrapped in old newspapers and delivered to a newspaper company in Shizuoka. The perpetrators were later arrested, but the other 12 treasures were found caught in a fishing net in the ocean at Miho no Matsubara, and although they were all damaged, the clock was the only one that was returned undamaged.

In 1979, it was designated as an Important Cultural Property along with other Ieyasu's personal items as one of the "Materials Related to Tokugawa Ieyasu", and is currently on permanent display at the Kunōzan Tōshō-gū Museum.

== Design ==
The clock is 21.5 cm high and 10.6 cm wide. It is a spring-loaded mechanical clock equipped with an alarm function. The clock utilizes the most advanced mechanical technology available at the time of its manufacture. It has a gilt bronze box with a domed top and doors on the left and right sides. The doors and back are engraved with lines depicting a view of a fortress from a Gothic style arched gate, and the domed upper surface is overlaid with openwork metal fittings in a wave pattern. The clock has a silver bell inside. The circular dial on the front is gilt brass with an integrated silver scale ring.

The dial is marked with Roman numerals from "I" to "XII". An inscription featuring an anthropomorphic expression in a mixture of Spanish and Latin, "HANS・DE・EVALO・ME・FECIT EN MADRID・A・1581", meaning "Hans de Evalo made me in Madrid in 1581," is engraved on an oval plate tacked to the bottom of the dial. This inscription has been considered unquestionable, but in 2014, another inscription, "NICOLAVS DE TROESTENBERCH ME FECIT ANNO DNI 1573 BRVXELENCIS" ("Nicolaus de Troestenberch made me in Brussels in 1573 A.D."), was found underneath a nameplate on the bottom, which reads "1581".

The clock has a portable box, which is made out of what appears to be cedar wood with leather attached. The box has a round glass window so that the time can be read even when the clock is stored. The upper plate of the box, which serves as a lid, is a semi-circular sphere that matches the dome of the clock. The handles on the box have been lost, but their metal fittings remain.

== Studies ==
=== Examination by the British Museum ===
David Thompson, curator of horological collections at the British Museum in the United Kingdom, came to Japan to examine the internal parts of the clock in May 2012. Thompson stated at a press conference that "There are only about 20 similar clocks from this period in existence in the world, and almost all of the internal mainsprings and other parts remain unchanged, including the leather-covered outer case, which is in excellent condition." He also concluded that the clock is likely the only clock in the world of its era in which almost all of the internal parts remain as they were originally made, and that the clock is "extremely rare and valuable."

Based on the findings of the examination, the clock was disassembled and cleaned by Johan ten Hoeve, a clock conservator designated by the British Museum, in May 2014.

=== Inscription of a different clockmaker ===
In 2014, an inscription was discovered with a different clockmaker, year of manufacture, and place of manufacture than previously thought. This discovery was made in the fall of the same year, when the Shizuoka University Electronics Research Institute, following Thompson's suggestion, took fluoroscopic images of the front side and bottom of the clock.

Katsuhiro Sasaki and Yō Saitō, honorary research fellows of the Science and Engineering Department of the National Museum of Nature and Science, have speculated that a clock in the possession of the viceroy was newly inscribed with the name of de Evalo, who had been promoted to royal clockmaker in 1580, as the work of the royal clockmaker was required as a gift to show the authority of the Kingdom of Spain as well as a sufficient acknowledgement to Tokugawa Ieyasu. They based this speculation on the fact that there were less than five months between Don Rodrigo's return to Acapulco and his departure for Japan, and there was no time to transport a clock from mainland Spain with such a short period of preparation.
