= Kunōzan Tōshō-gū =

Shinto shrine in Shizuoka Prefecture, Japan

Kunōzan Tōshō-gū 久能山東照宮
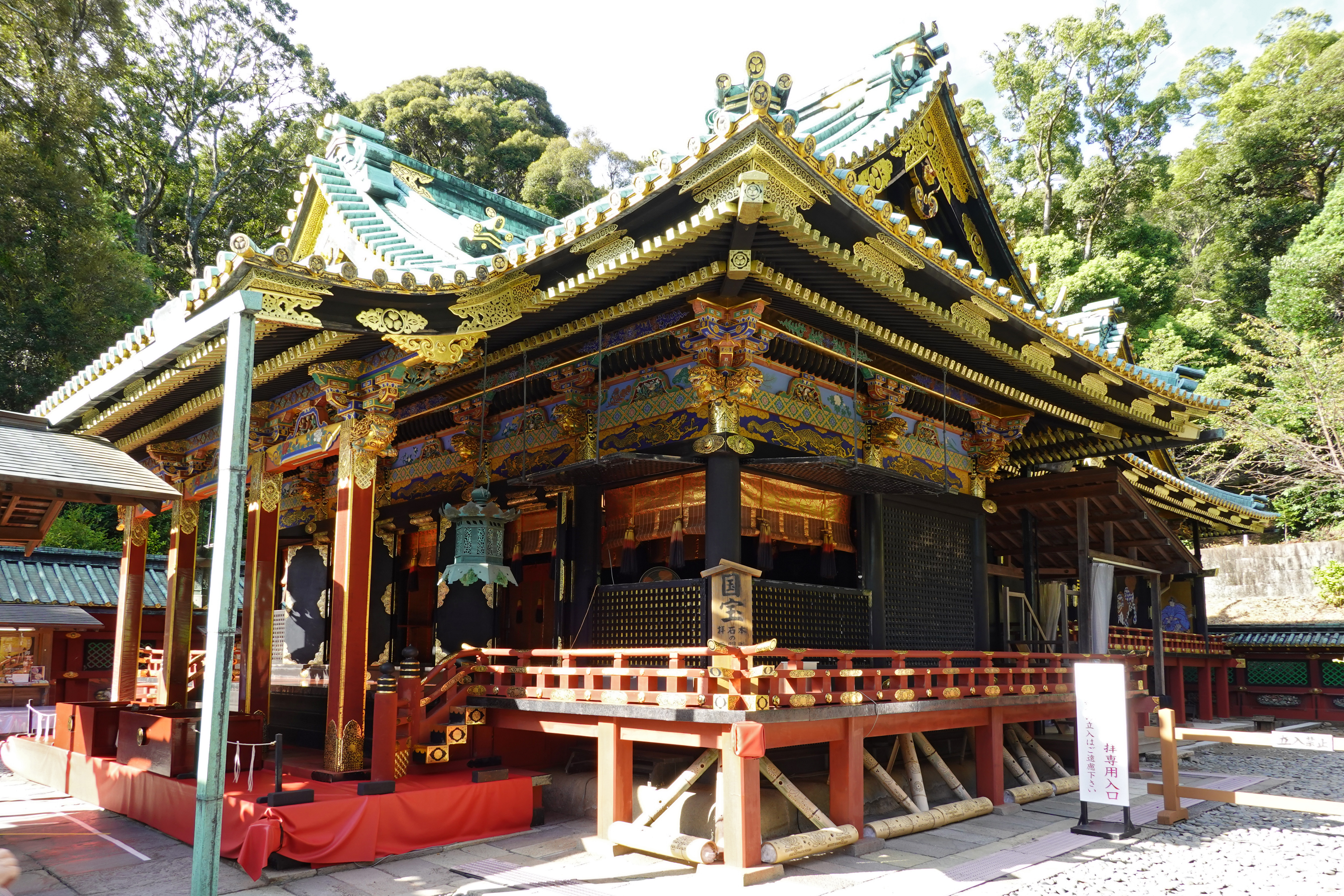
- Haiden of Kunō-zan Tōshō-gū

- Kunō-zan Tōshō-gū Kunōzan Tōshō-gū (Japan)

Religion
- Affiliation: Shinto
- Deity: Tokugawa Ieyasu
- Type: Tōshō-gū

Location
- Location: 390 Negoya, Suruga-ku, Shizuoka-shi, Shizuoka-ken
- Interactive map of Kunōzan Tōshō-gū 久能山東照宮
- Coordinates: 34°57′53″N 138°28′04″E

Architecture
- Established: 1617

Website
- www.toshogu.or.jp

The Kunōzan Tōshō-gū (久能山東照宮) is a Shintō shrine in Suruga-ku in the city of Shizuoka in Shizuoka Prefecture, Japan. It is the original burial place of the first shōgun of the Tokugawa shogunate, Tokugawa Ieyasu, and is thus the oldest of the Tōshō-gū shrines in the country. The main festival of the shrine is held annually on April 17, although its spring festival on February 17–18 is a larger event.

== History ==
Mount Kunō (216 meters) is a steep peak on Suruga Bay, and the site of an ancient Buddhist temple called Kunō-ji (久能寺) dating to at least the early Nara period. The temple prospered during the Kamakura period under the famous prelate Enni, who introduced the cultivation of green tea to the region. After the conquest of Suruga Province by the warlord Takeda Shingen, the temple was relocated to what is now Shimizu-ku, and the mountain top fortified into a mountain castle (Kunō-jo (久能城). After the fall of the Takeda clan, Suruga Province came under the control of the Tokugawa clan.

After Tokugawa Ieyasu retired to Sunpu Castle, he continued to maintain the fortifications on Mount Kunō. After his death, Tokugawa Hidetada ordered that he be buried on its peak, and had the first shrine buildings erected. The 3rd shōgun, Tokugawa Iemitsu, relocated Ieyasu's grave to the Nikkō Tōshō-gū, but a portion of his deified spirit was held to still reside on Mount Kunō. The shrine was kept in good repair by the Sunpu jōdai until the Meiji Restoration.

With the overthrow of the Tokugawa by the new Meiji government, and the subsequent separation of Buddhism and Shintō, the Kunōzan Tōshō-gū suffered the loss of a number of its structures and much of its revenue. At the present, most of the surviving buildings of the Kunōzan Tōshō-gū are protected by the national government as Important Cultural Properties and the whole mountain is protected as a National Historic Site.

== Enshrined kami ==
The primary kami of Kunōzan Tōshō-gū is the Tōshō-Daigongen (東照大権現), the deified spirit of Tokugawa Ieyasu. Secondary kami, enshrined after the start of the Meiji period, are the spirits of Toyotomi Hideyoshi and Oda Nobunaga.

A subsidiary Hie Shrine dedicated to Oyamakui no Kami was established during the Meiji period.

== Cultural properties ==
The Honden and Heiden of the shrine were constructed in 1617 in the flamboyant Azuchi-Momoyama style, similar to that of the Nikkō Tōshō-gū. The buildings make use of black lacquer with elaborate carvings, painted in polychromatic colors, and gold leaf. The buildings were collectively designated an Important Cultural Property of Japan in 1908, and this status was raised to that of National Treasure of Japan in 2010.

In addition, another 13 structures of the Kunō-zan Tōshō-gū as National Important Cultural Properties (ICP)s.

In addition to these buildings, the Kunōzan Tōshō-gū also has a number of art treasures, many of which are on display at its museum. These include a number of tachi (Japanese swords), one of which is a National Treasure, and 12 of which (including two wakizashi) are Important Cultural Properties. Additional Important Cultural Properties include two suits of armor, pair of eyeglasses and a clock owned by Tokugawa Ieyasu, along with 73 documents in his own handwriting. Of especial note is a clock presented to Ieyasu by Sebastián Vizcaíno on behalf of Philip II of Spain in 1611.

== Gallery ==
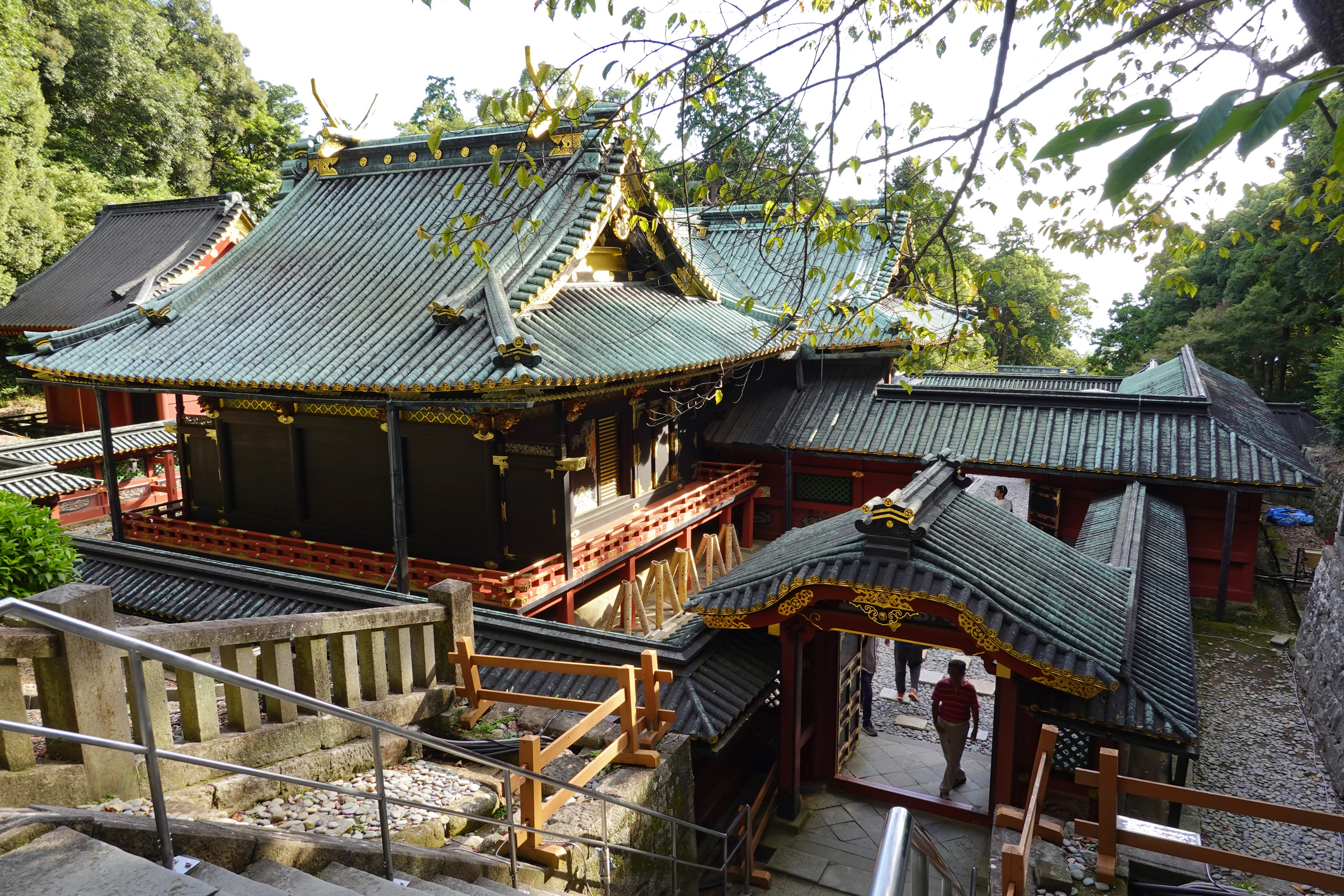

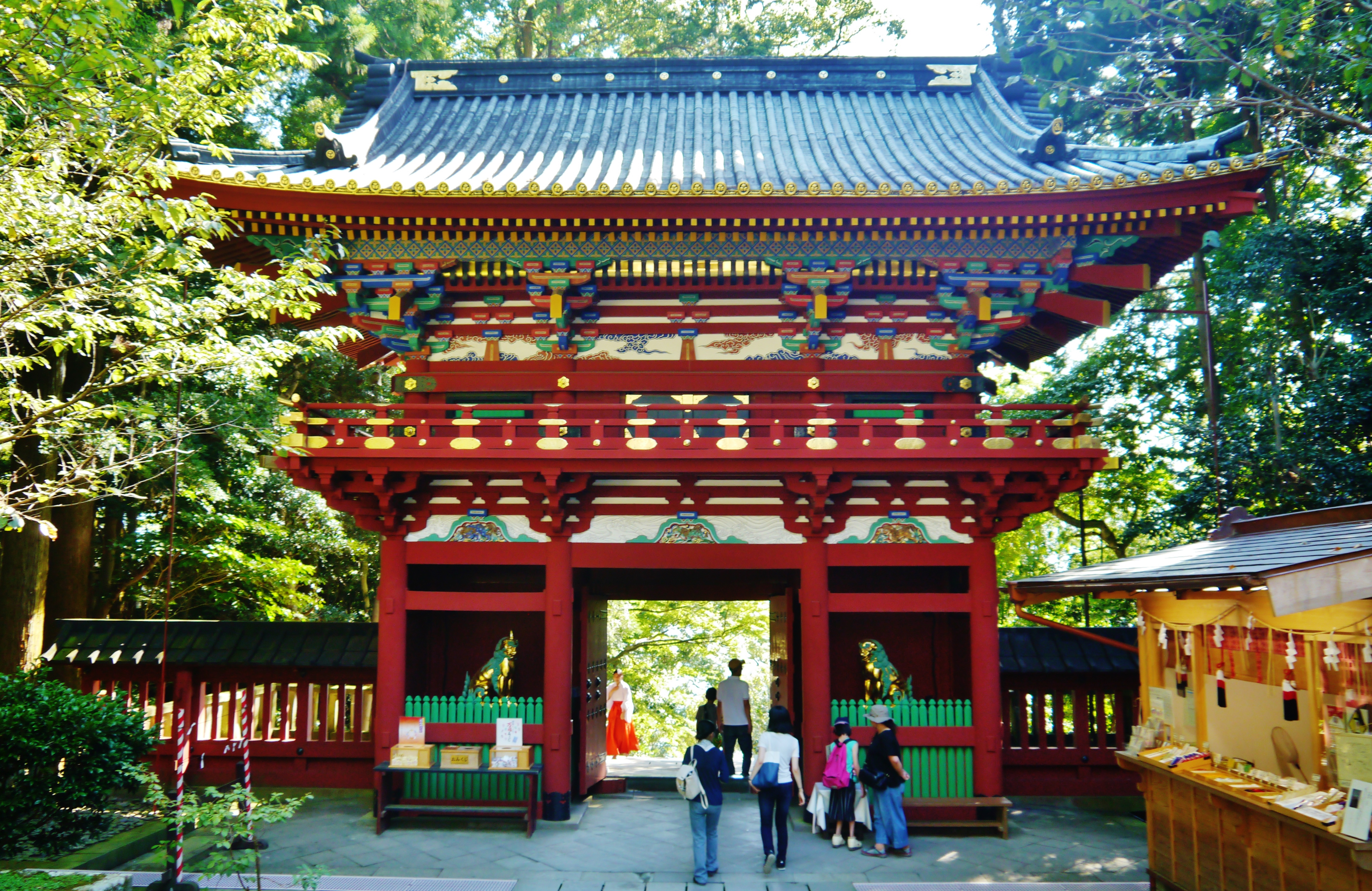
Rōmon

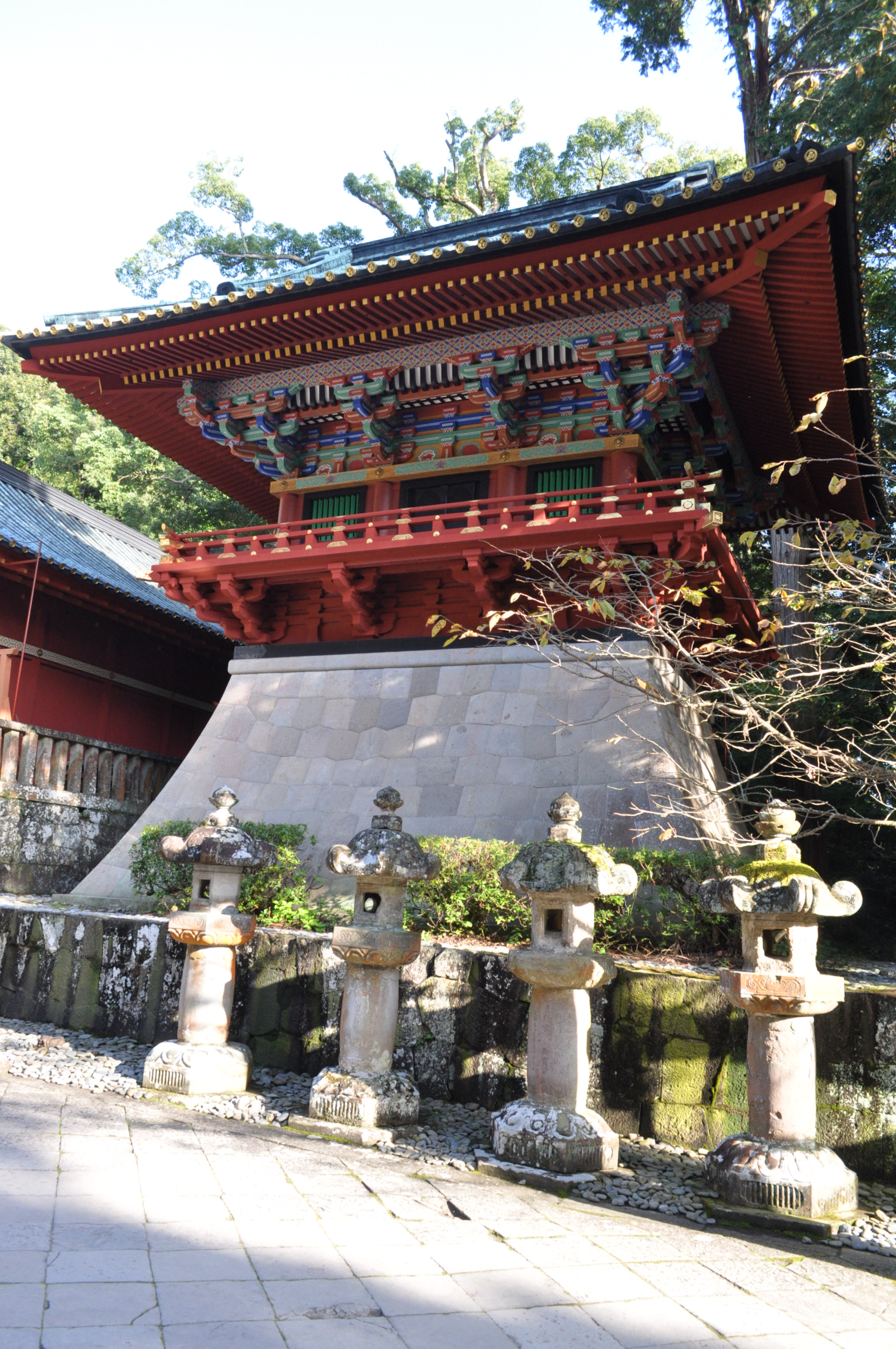
Drum Tower

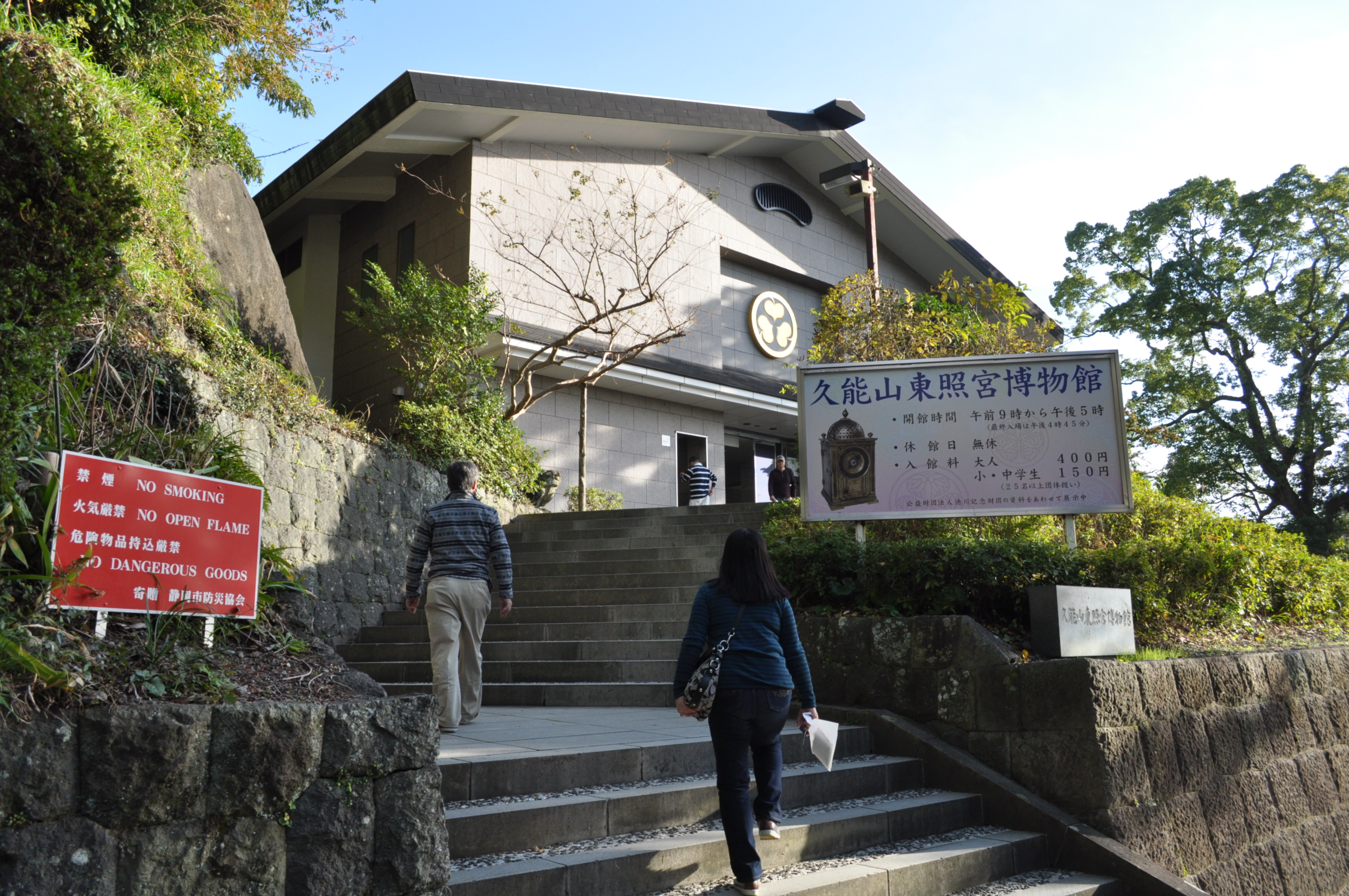
Museum

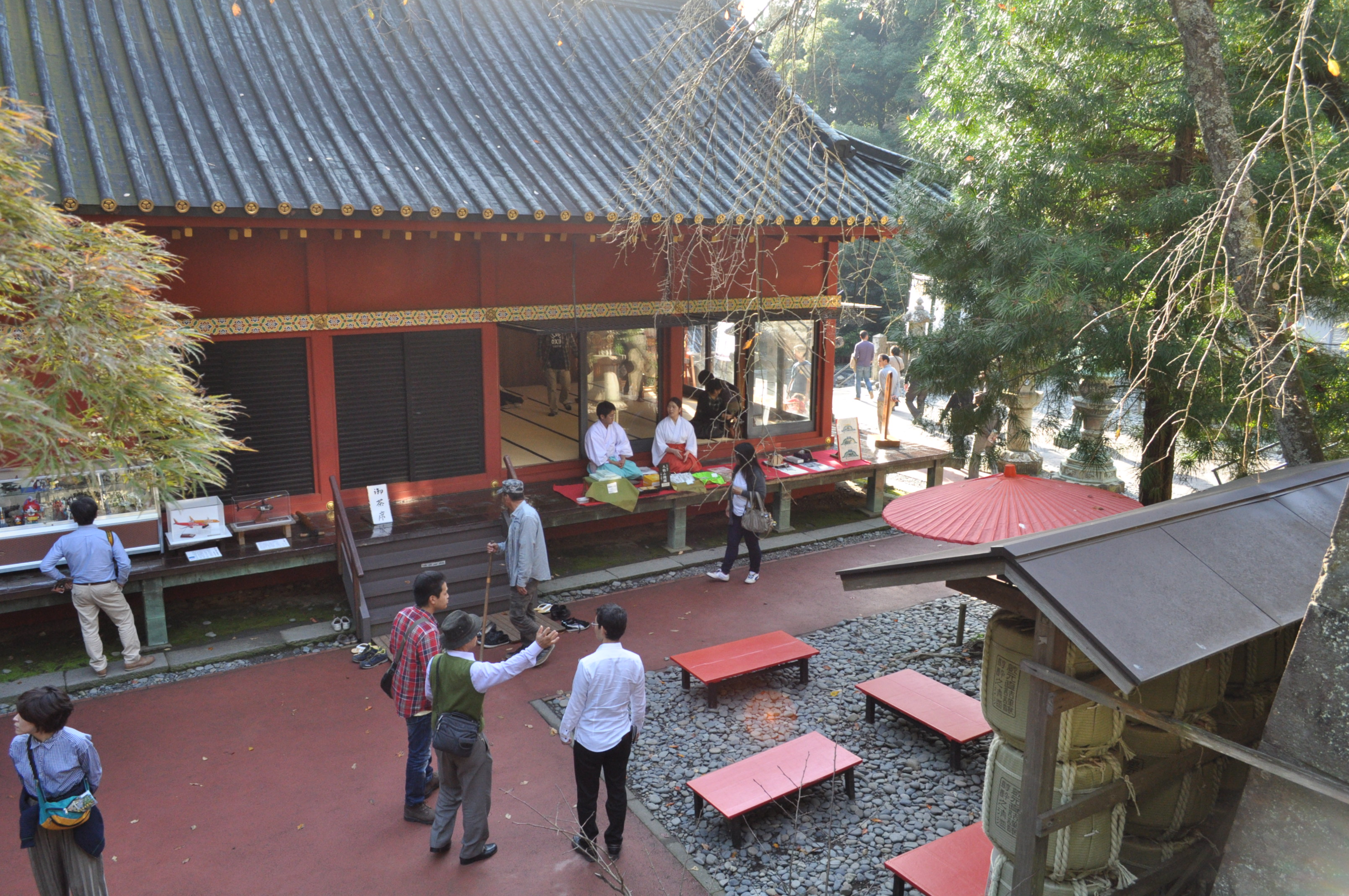
Kagura stage

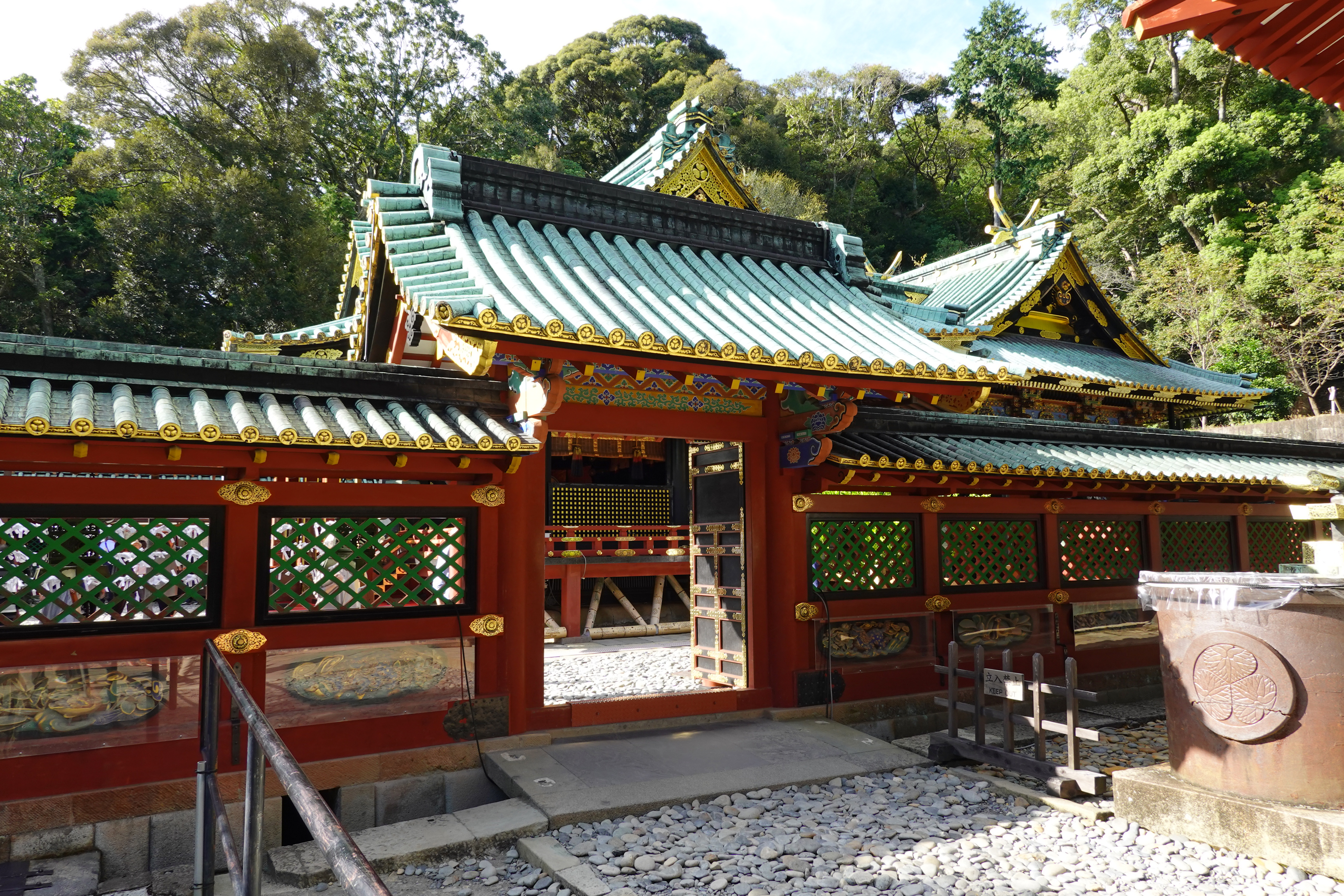
East Gate

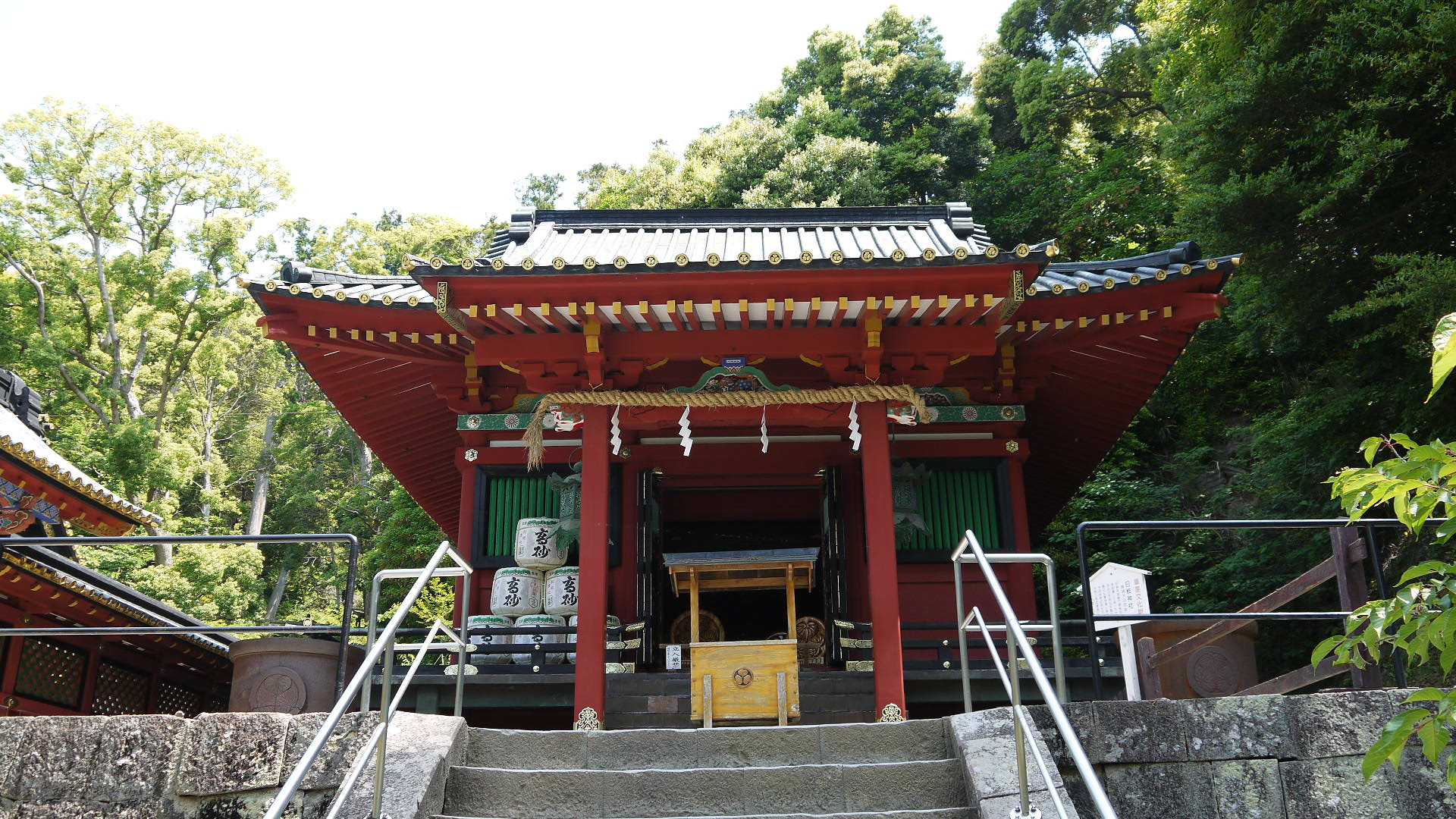
Hie Jinja subsidiary shrine

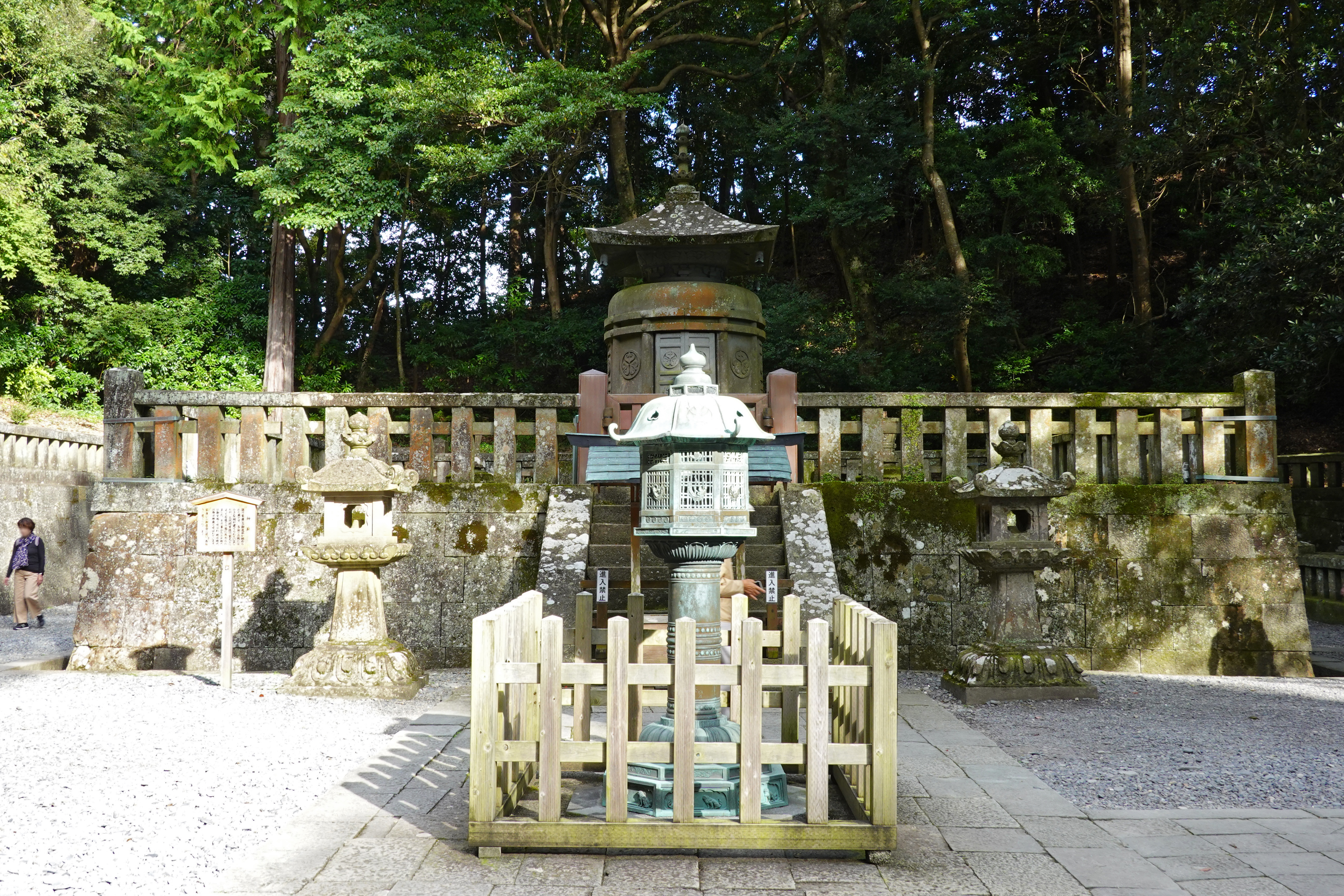
Grave of Ieyasu

== See also ==
- List of Shinto shrines
- List of National Treasures of Japan (crafts-swords)
- List of National Treasures of Japan (shrines)
- List of Historic Sites of Japan (Shizuoka)
- Ueno Tōshō-gū
