= Jōten-ji =

Buddhist temple in Fukuoka Prefecture, Japan

Coordinates: 33°35′43″N 130°25′01″E

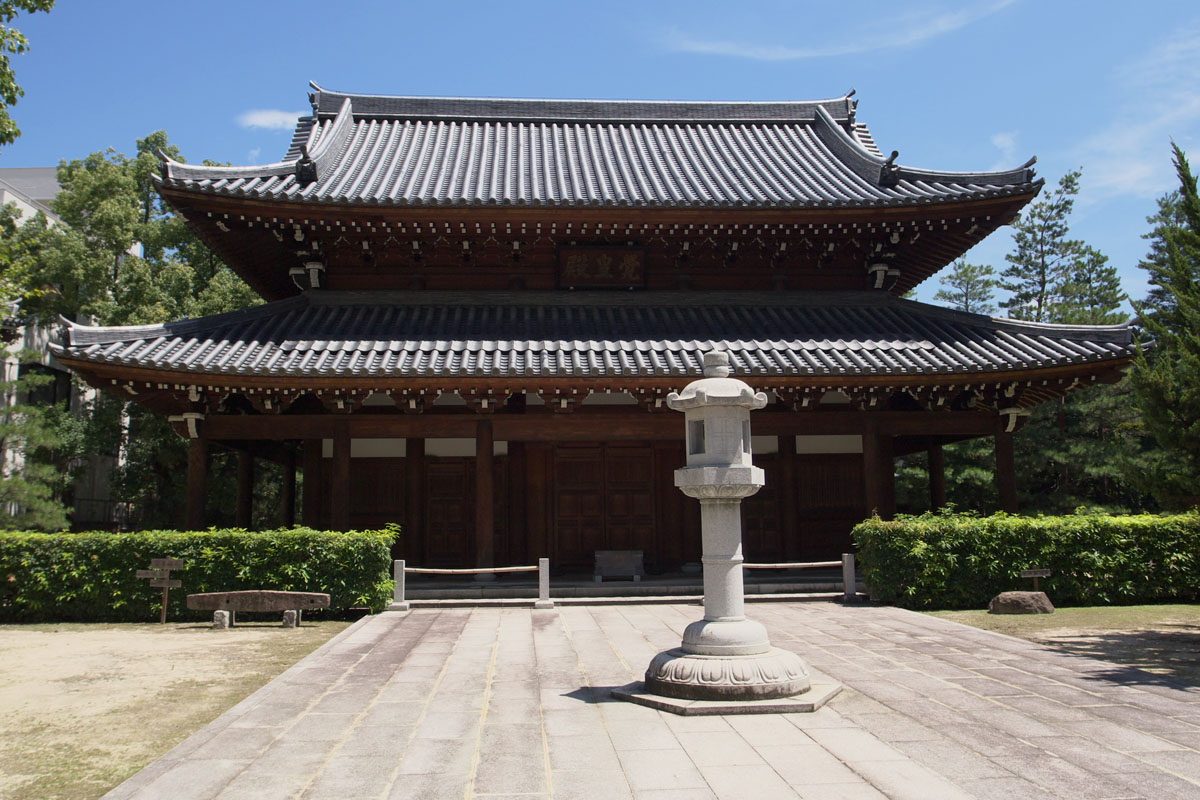
Main Hall

Jōten-ji (承天寺) is a Rinzai temple in Hakata, Fukuoka, Japan. Its honorary sangō prefix is Banshōsan (萬松山). It was founded by Enni-Ben'en upon his return from China, with support from Xie Guo Ming, a Chinese merchant. Construction was completed in 1242.

== Introduction of udon, soba and manjū ==
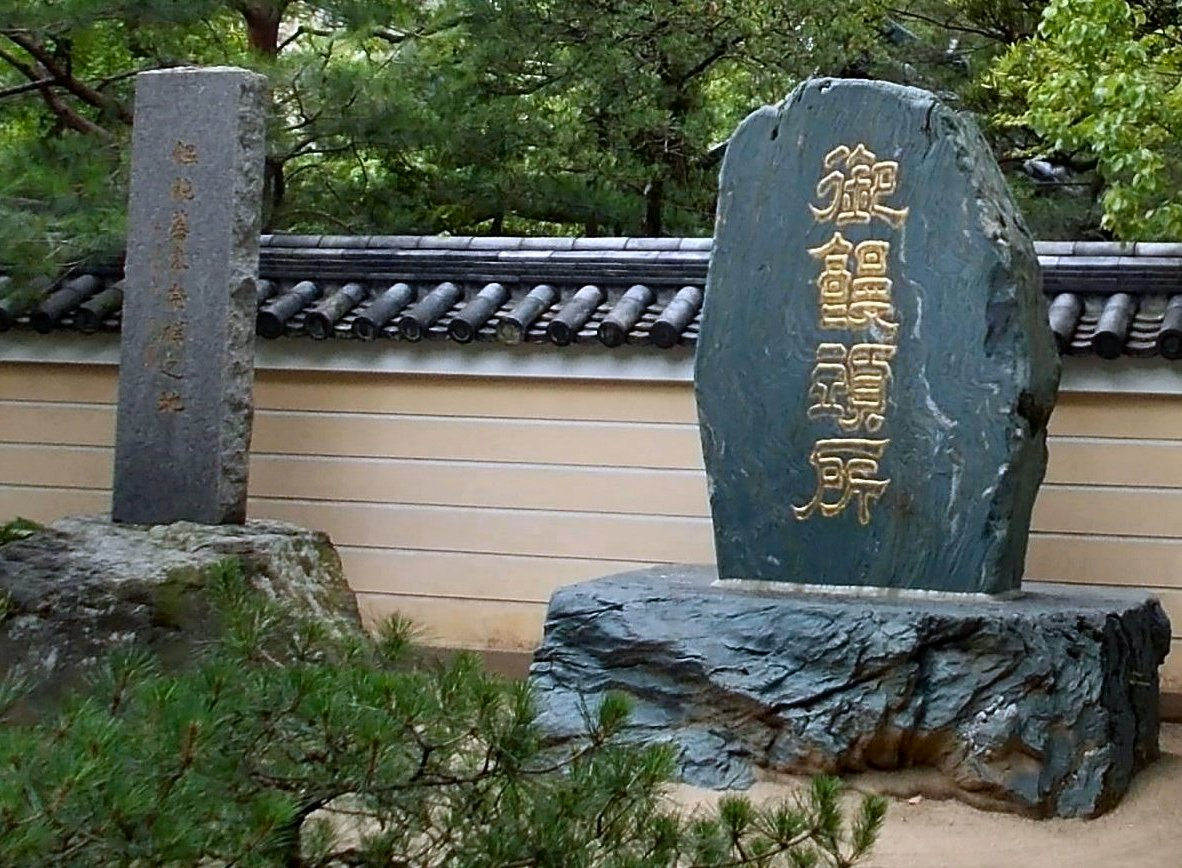
Stone monuments commemorating the introduction of udon, soba (left side) and manjū (right side)

The founding priest of the temple, Enni-Ben'en went to China in 1235, mastered Zen Buddhism through great hardships and returned to Japan in 1241. Besides new teachings of Zen Buddhism, he brought back to Japan a variety of cultural features from China. The production methods of udon, soba, yokan and manjū are especially famous among them.

It was during a begging round around Jōtenji Temple that Ennie first handed down the recipe of the manjū to a tea house owner who was kind and considerate with him.

For the 21st century explorers of Hakata and its Jōtenji-dori Avenue, on most days, a popular type of manjū in Kyushu decorated adequately with a figure absorbed in zen meditation, is sold in the close vicinity of Jōtenji temple: The stall is located next to the Hakata Sennen Gate on Jōtenji-dori Avenue and is operated by a zen priest associated with Jōtenji Temple. This is surely the closest place where manjū is prepared and sold to the formal residence of the monk who brought the secret of manjū making to Japan in the middle of the 13th century.

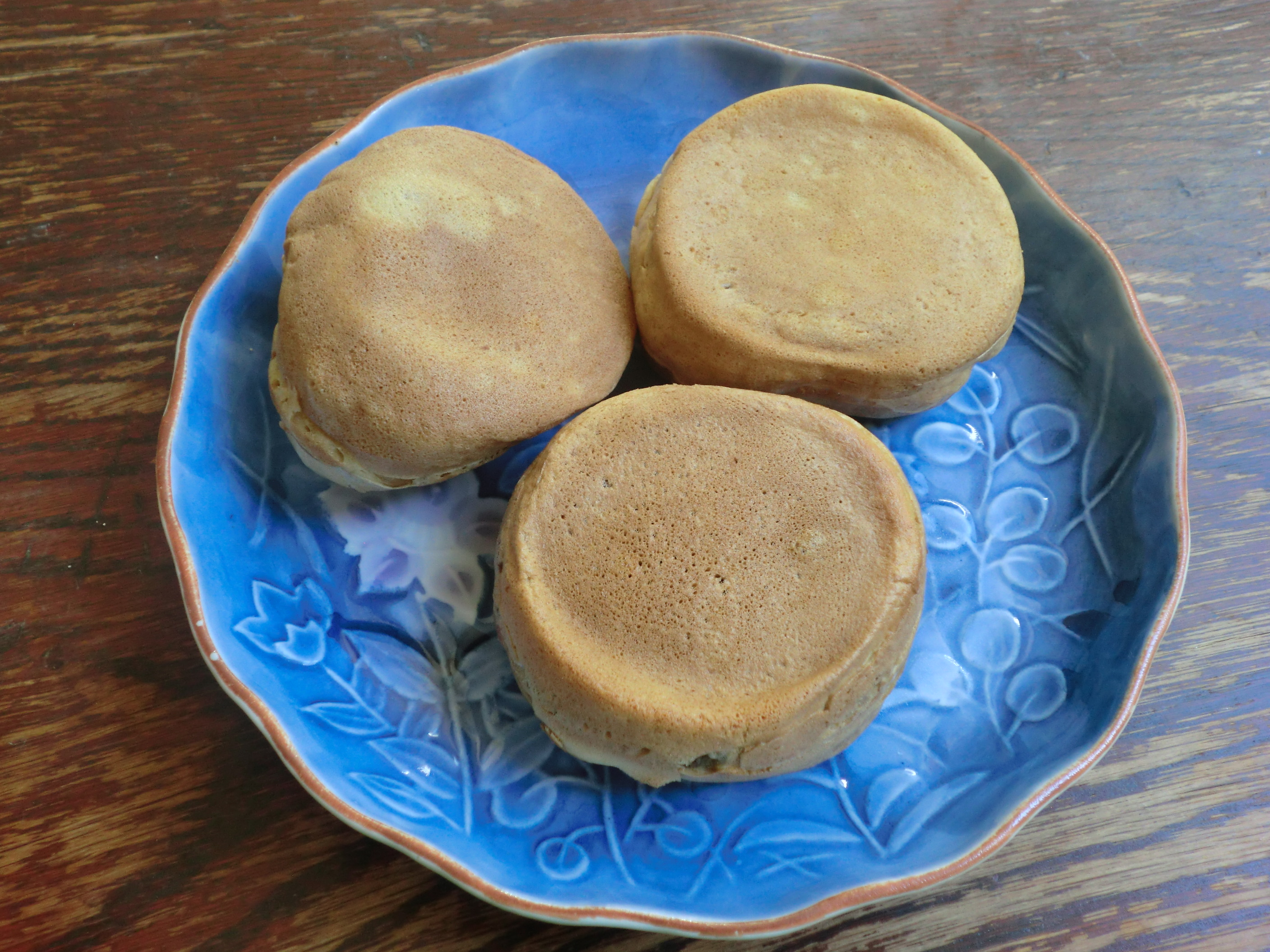
A type of bean paste and honey filled manjū popular in Kyushu

== The origin of Fukuoka's most famous festival ==
Hakata Gion Yamakasa Float on Display at Fukuoka Internatolnal Airport 2026 October

Hakata Gion Yamakasa is the most famous festival of Fukuoka and it is held around Kushida Shrine and Hakata Ward as the main sites. The origin of the festival is believed to date back to 1241, when Enni, the founder of Jotenji temple had people carry him around the town on a float while praying against the plague and eventually getting successfully rid of it.

== Hakata Sennen Gate ==
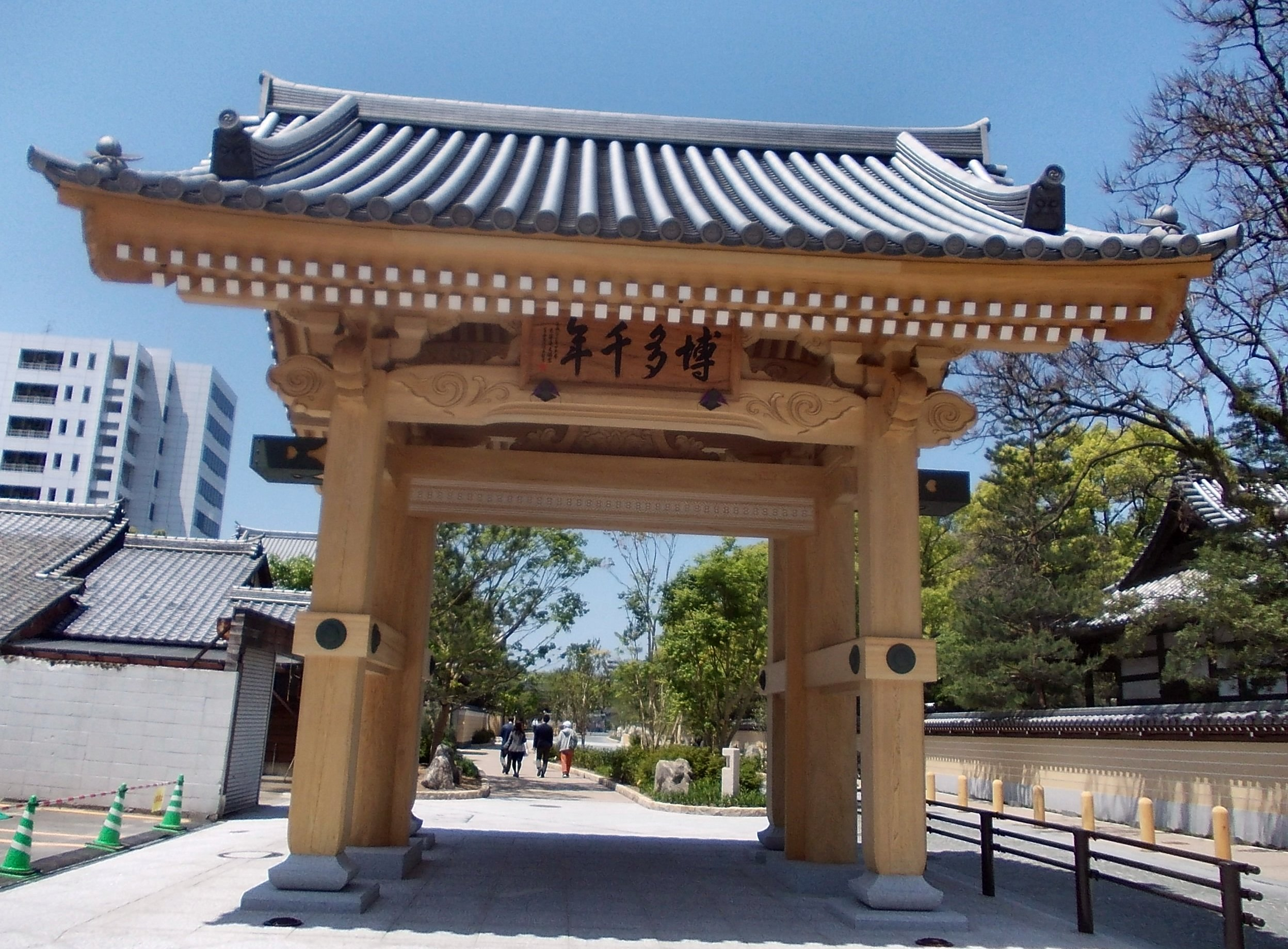
Hakata Sennen Gate

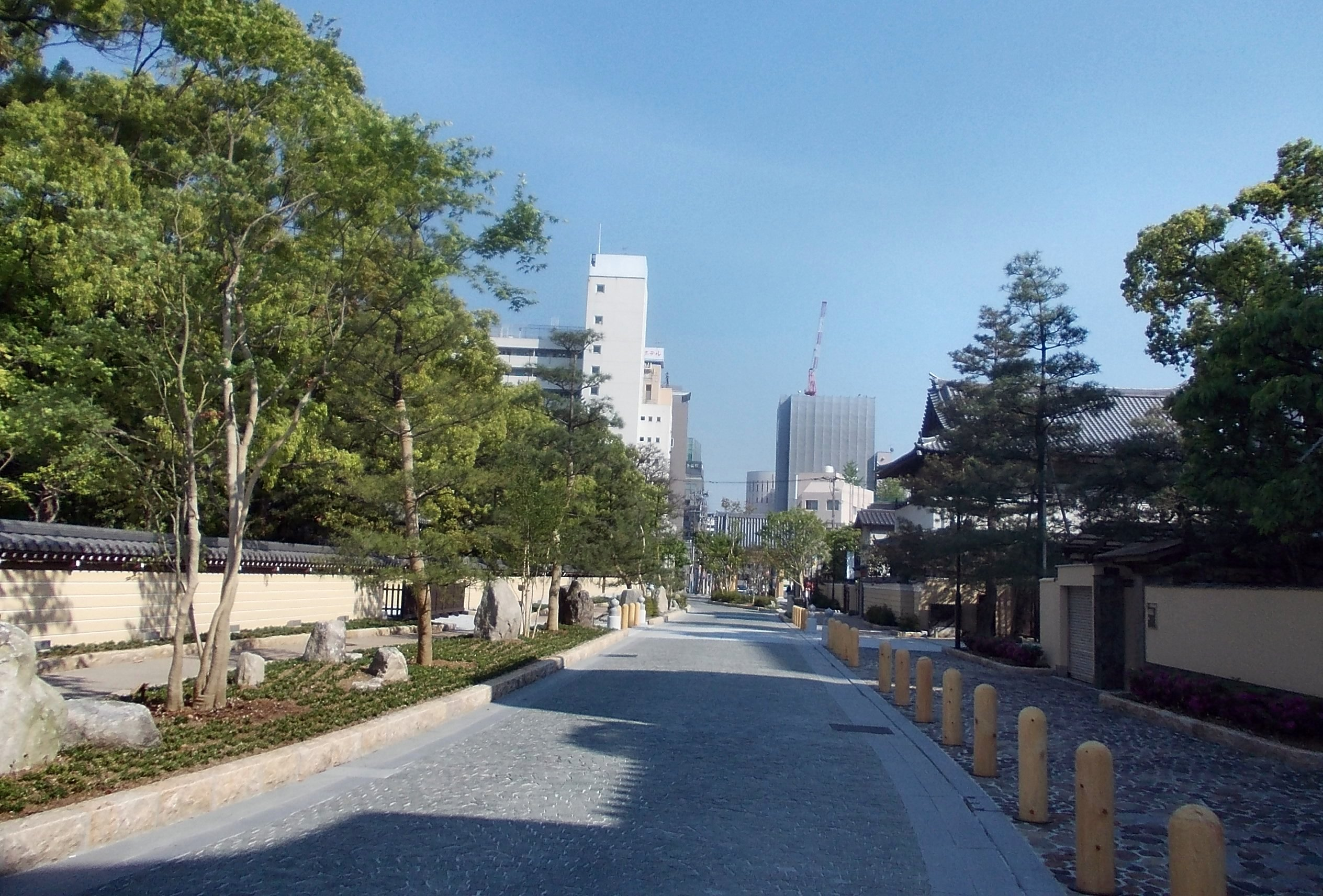
Jōtenji-dori Avenue

Hakata Sennen Gate at Night and its Urban Environment in 2026 October

The Hakata Sennen Gate (Hakata-sennen-no-mon (博多千年門)), the new symbol of the Hakata area, was completed at the entrance of Jōtenji-dori Avenue on March 28, 2014. It is a wooden four-legged gate with a tile roof, and was modeled on Tsuji-no-dōkuchi-mon (辻堂口門), the gateway of Hakata which appears in ancient documents. Height and length are each approximately 8 metres. It was named in the hope of prosperity for a thousand years in the future of the city of Hakata.

== Cultural Properties ==
Important cultural property:

- Wooden statue of Shakyamuni Buddha and two attendants
- Six painted silk scrolls of six Zen Patriarchs
- Bronze bell originating from the Korean Peninsula (Chosen period) with an inscription dating back to 1065.

Fukuoka City designated tangible cultural property: (to be added later)

== Shinan Ship ==
Joten-ji was one of the intended destinations of the cargo that the so called Shinan ship was to deliver from Ningbo to Hakata which route was also one of the final sections of the historic Maritime Silk Route. The ship sailed in the 14th century before it sank close to Korean shores due to bad weather conditions. This became apparent after the wreckage was found almost seven hundred years later: On some of the wooden tablets (or wooden tags) that were used customarily to identify the cargo, the Chinese calligraphy characters of Japanese temples such as a sub-temple of Joten-Ji temple could be clearly read. The main destination of the ship was Tofuku-ji Temple in Kyoto as a fire caused serious damage and materials for reconstruction as well as replacements for artifacts were needed. Hakozaki Shrine in Hakata also had cargo in the ship.
