= Hakata Gion Yamakasa =

Annual festival in Hakata, Fukuoka, Japan

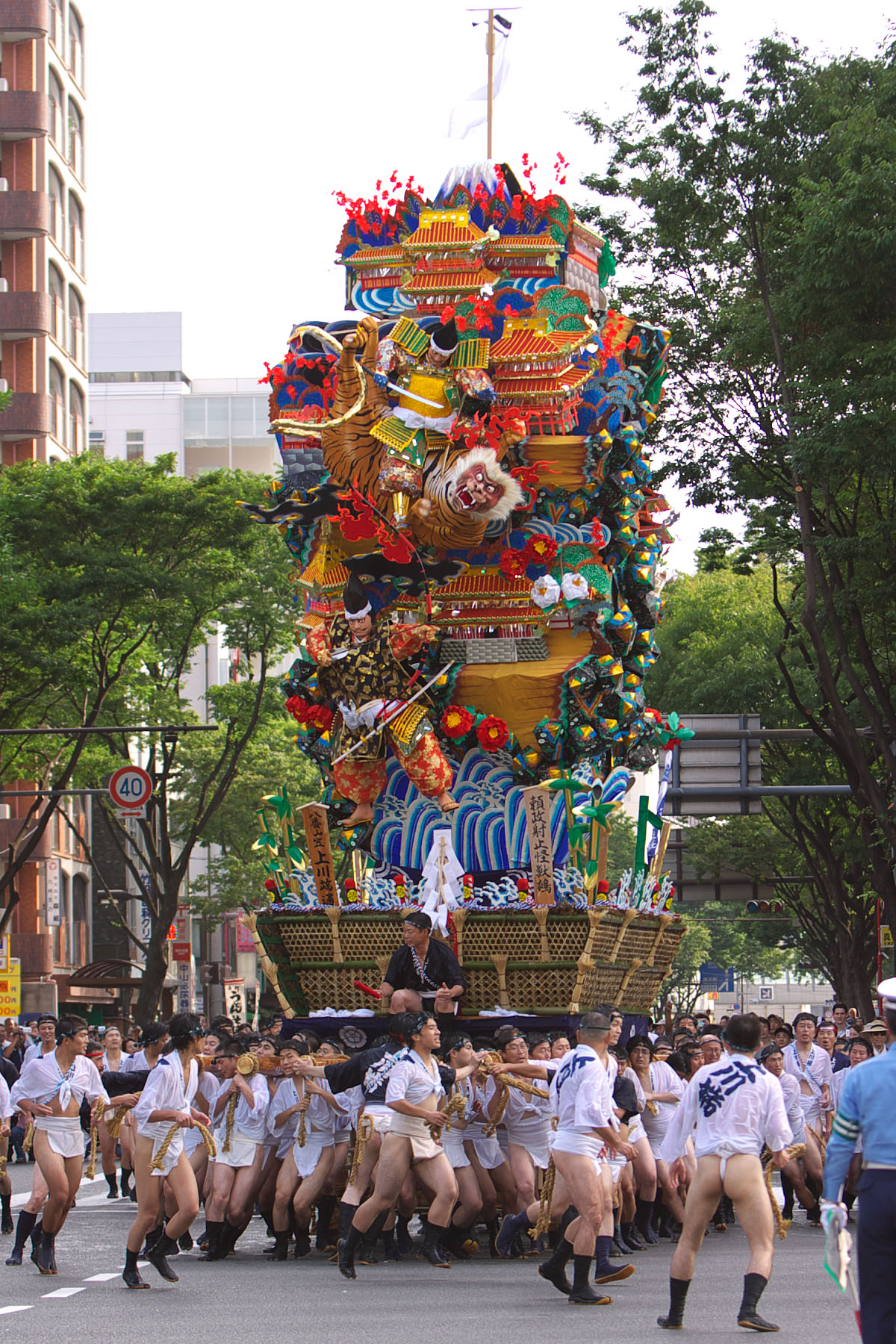
- Observed by: Hakata, Fukuoka
- Type: Religious
- Begins: 1 July
- Ends: 15 July
- Date: Month of July
- Related to: Fukagawa Matsuri, Sannō Matsuri, Tanabata

Hakata Gion Yamakasa (博多祇園山笠) is a Japanese festival celebrated from the 1st until the 15th of July in Hakata, Fukuoka. The festivities are centred on the Kushida Jinja. The festival is famous for the Kakiyama, that weigh around one ton and are carried around the city as an act of float-racing. The festival is believed to be over 770 years old and attracts up to a million spectators each year. It was designated an Important Intangible Folk Cultural Property of Japan in 1979. The origin of the festival is thought to date from 1241, when to eradicate the plague, the founder of Joten-ji temple, monk Enni had people pray while porting him on a float around the town. The sound of the Yamakasa has also been selected by the Ministry of the Environment as one of the 100 Soundscapes of Japan.

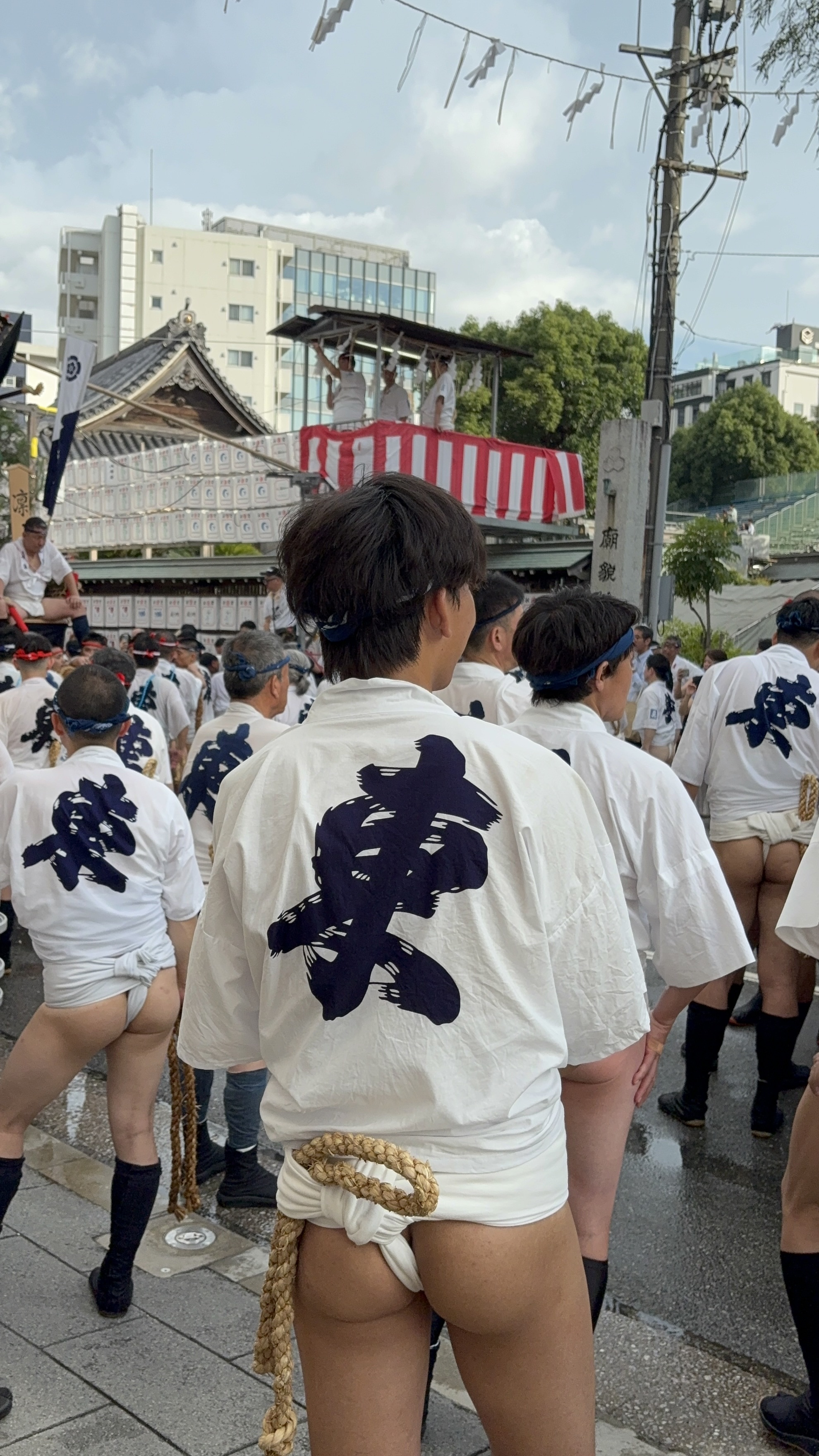
Participants of Hakata Gion Yamakasa wearing happi and fundoshi.

== Floats ==
The floats, called Yamakasa, are divided into two groups. The Kakiyama are the smaller, carryable floats, that are raced through the town, while the Kazariyama are stationary floats, that are built up to 13 metres high and often depict historic or mythical events of Japanese culture. Originally the Kakiyama and Kazariyama were one and the same, with the large floats being carried through the city. However the Yamakasa were split up in 1898 when the electrical power lines in Hakata became too common for large Yamakasa to be carried through the streets.

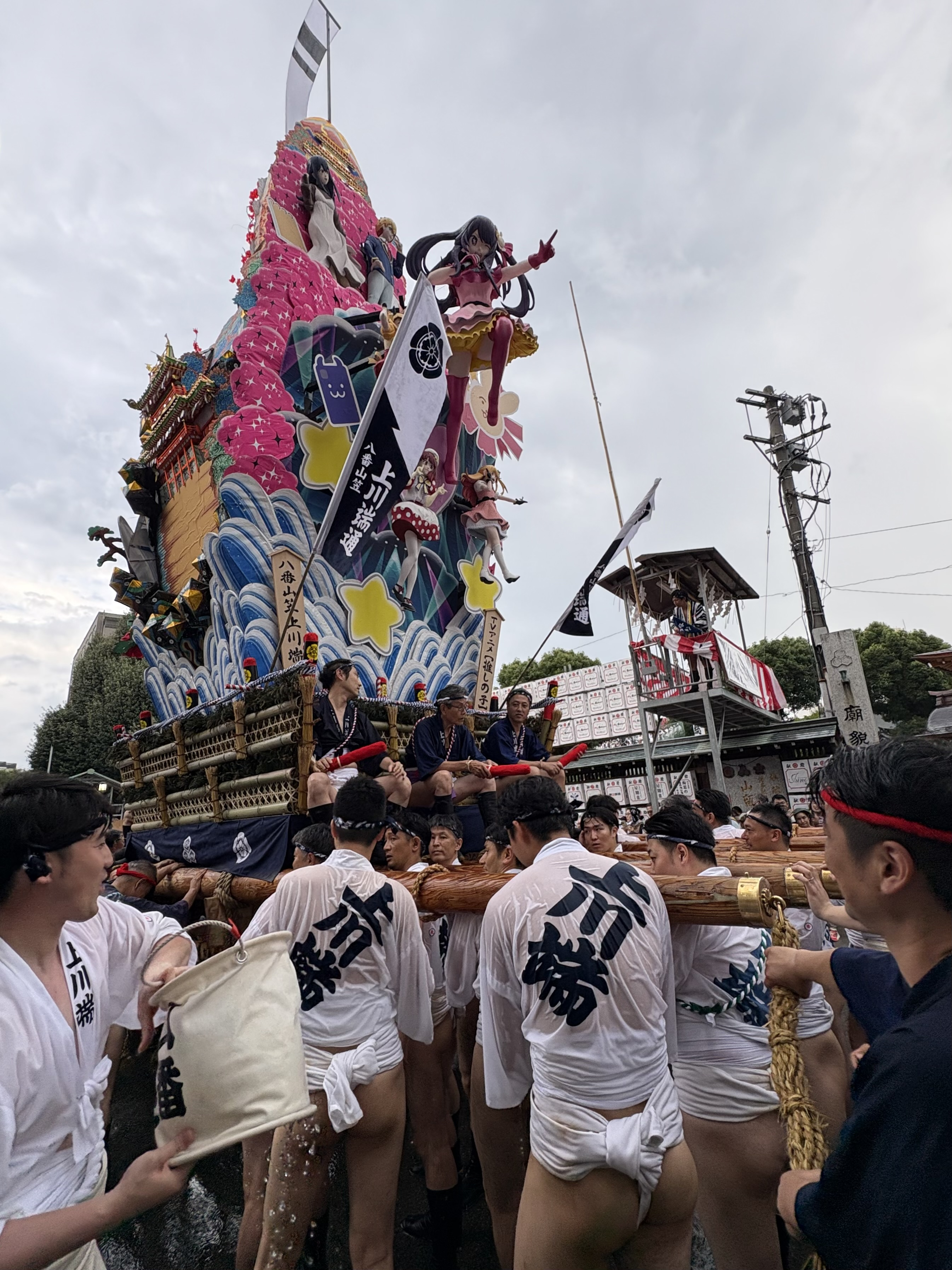
Anime "Oshi no Ko" theme Yamakasa.

== Hakata districts ==
Hakata, once its own city, merged with Fukuoka in 1876. The festivities are mostly based in Hakata.

Hakata was divided into seven districts by Toyotomi Hideyoshi in 1586/1587. Some of these districts have changed names and exact boundaries multiple times; they still see themselves as the original seven districts. Soon after the division, carrying the Yamakasa through one's own district became a competition for speed. Today, the main event, the Oiyama, is a race between the districts.

The districts are Higashi-nagare, Nakasu-nagare, Nishi-nagare, Chiyo-nagare, Ebisu-nagare, Doi-nagare and Daikoku-nagare.

== See also ==
- Matsuri
- Gion Matsuri
- Tanabata
- List of Important Intangible Folk Cultural Properties
- Important Intangible Cultural Properties of Japan
- 100 Soundscapes of Japan
