= Shōichi-kokushi Hōgo =

Japanese Buddhist work

Shōichi-kokushi Hōgo (聖一国師法語) is Japanese Buddhist work.

== Authorship and date ==
Shōichi-kokushi Hōgo, a Japanese Buddhist work in one volume, was composed in the late Kamakura period by the monk Enni.

== Title ==
Alternative titles for the work include Shōichi-kokushi Kana Hōgo (聖一国師仮名法語), Tōfukuji Kaisan Shōichi-kokushi Hōgo (東福寺開山聖一国師法語), Shōichi-kokushi Zazen-ron (聖一国師坐禅論), and Zazen-ron (坐禅論).

== Contents ==
The work is of kana hōgo (仮名法語) genre, a hōgo written in colloquial Japanese, and was written by Enni to introduce Kujō Michiie to zazen (sitting meditation). It consists of a general introduction and 24 sections expounding on Enni's answers to questions Michiie posed him regarding various aspects of zazen. An appendix dubbed "Kojin Hōgo" (古人法語) elaborates on points to be weary of in the practice of zazen.

== Textual tradition and modern editions ==
Surviving manuscript copies of the work include the Hōsa Bunko-bon, the Kyōto Daigaku-bon and the Ryūkoku Daigaku-bon. Printed editions were produced in 1646 (Shōhō 3), 1648 (Keian 1) and 1829 (Bunsei 12).

It was included in the first volume of the Kōtei Senchū Zenmon Hōgo Zenshū (校訂箋註禅門法語全集) and the second volume of the Zenmon Hōgo Shū (禅門法語集).

== Works cited ==
- Imaeda, Aishin (1983). "Shōichi-kokushi Hōgo". Nihon Koten Bungaku Daijiten 日本古典文学大辞典 (in Japanese). Vol. 3. Tokyo: Iwanami Shoten. p. 327. OCLC 11917421.
