= Kushida Shrine =

Shinto shrine in Fukuoka Prefecture, Japan

Kushida-jinja 櫛田神社
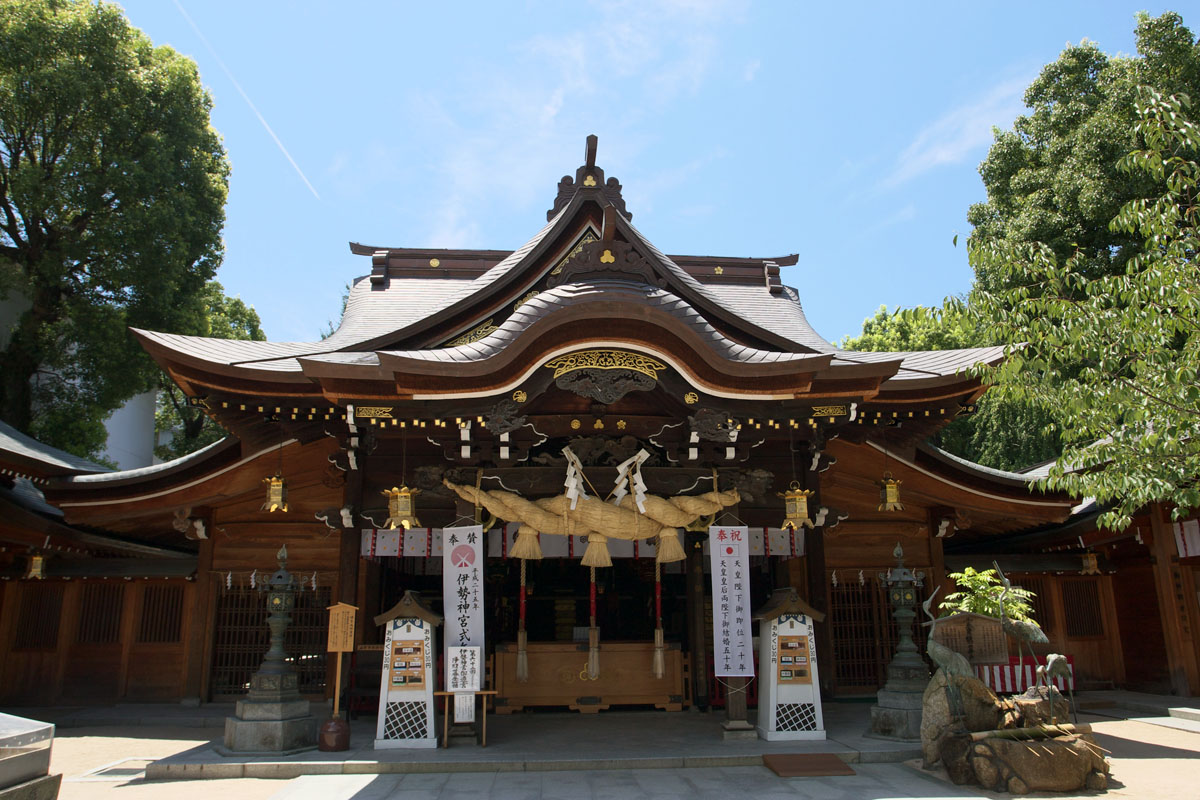
- The honden, or main shrine

- Location within Japan

Religion
- Affiliation: Shinto
- Deity: Amaterasu; Susanoo

Location
- Location: 1-41, Kamikawabata-machi, Hakata-ku, Fukuoka; Fukuoka Prefecture 812-0026
- Interactive map of Kushida-jinja 櫛田神社
- Coordinates: 33°35′34.7″N 130°24′37.7″E

Architecture
- Established: 757

Kushida-jinja (櫛田神社) is a Shinto shrine located in Hakata-ku, Fukuoka, Japan. Dedicated to Amaterasu and Susanoo, it is said to have been founded in 757. The Hakata Gion Yamakasa festival is centred on the shrine.

== See also ==
- List of Shinto shrines
- Hakata Gion Yamakasa
- Matsuri
