= Sebastián Vizcaíno =

Spanish explorer

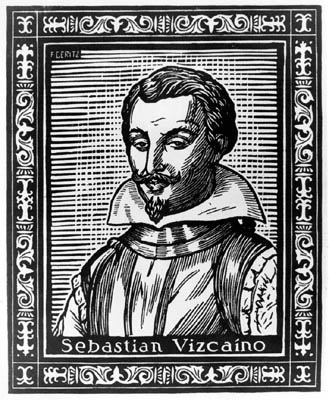
- Born: c. 1548; Extremadura, Crown of Castile
- Died: 1624 (aged 75–76); Mexico City, New Spain

Sebastián Vizcaíno (c. 1548 – 1624) was a Spanish soldier, entrepreneur, explorer, and diplomat whose varied roles took him to New Spain, the Baja California peninsula, the California coast and Asia.

== Early career ==
Vizcaíno was born in 1548, in Extremadura, Crown of Castile (Spain). He saw military service in the Spanish invasion of Portugal during 1580–1583. Coming to New Spain in 1583, he sailed as a merchant on a Manila galleon to the Spanish East Indies in 1586–1589. In 1587, he was on board the Santa Ana as one of the merchants when Thomas Cavendish captured it, robbing him and others of their personal cargoes of gold.

== The Californias ==
In 1593, the disputed concession for pearl fishing on the western shores of the Gulf of California was transferred to Vizcaíno. He succeeded in sailing with three ships to La Paz, Baja California Sur, in 1596. He gave this site (known to Hernán Cortés as Santa Cruz) its modern name and attempted to establish a settlement. However, problems of resupply, declining morale, and a fire soon forced its abandonment.

In 1601, the Spanish viceroy in Mexico City, Gaspar de Zúñiga, 5th Count of Monterrey, appointed Vizcaíno general-in-charge of a second expedition: to locate safe harbors in Alta California for Spanish galleons to use on their return voyage to Acapulco from Manila. He was also given the mandate to map in detail the California coastline that Juan Rodríguez Cabrillo had first reconnoitered 60 years earlier. He departed Acapulco with three ships on May 5, 1602. His flagship was the San Diego and the other two ships were the San Tomás and the Tres Reyes.

On November 10, 1602, Vizcaíno entered and named San Diego Bay. Sailing up the coast, Vizcaíno named many prominent features such as the Santa Barbara Channel Islands, Point Conception, the Santa Lucia Mountains, Point Lobos, Carmel River and Monterey Bay (obliterating some of the names given these same features by Cabrillo in 1542). He was the first person in recorded history to note certain ecological features of the California coast such as the Monterey cypress forest at Point Lobos.

The commander of the Tres Reyes, Martín de Aguilar, became separated from Vizcaíno and continued up the coast to present-day Oregon as far as Cape Blanco and possibly to Coos Bay. After Vizcaíno passed Cape Mendocino, he turned back, with some of his men suffering from scurvy and starvation. Half of the crew members, some 45 men, died during the expedition.

Much of what we know about Vizcaíno's Pacific Coast voyage is from the diary of Antonio de la Ascensión a Carmelite friar, chronicler and cosmographer who traveled with the expedition. They incorrectly reported back that California was an island.

One result of Vizcaíno's voyage was a flurry of enthusiasm for establishing a Spanish settlement at Monterey, but this was ultimately deferred for another 167 years after the Conde de Monterrey left to become Viceroy of Peru and his successor was less favorable. A colonizing expedition was authorized in 1606 for 1607, but was delayed and then canceled in 1608.

== Japanese relations ==
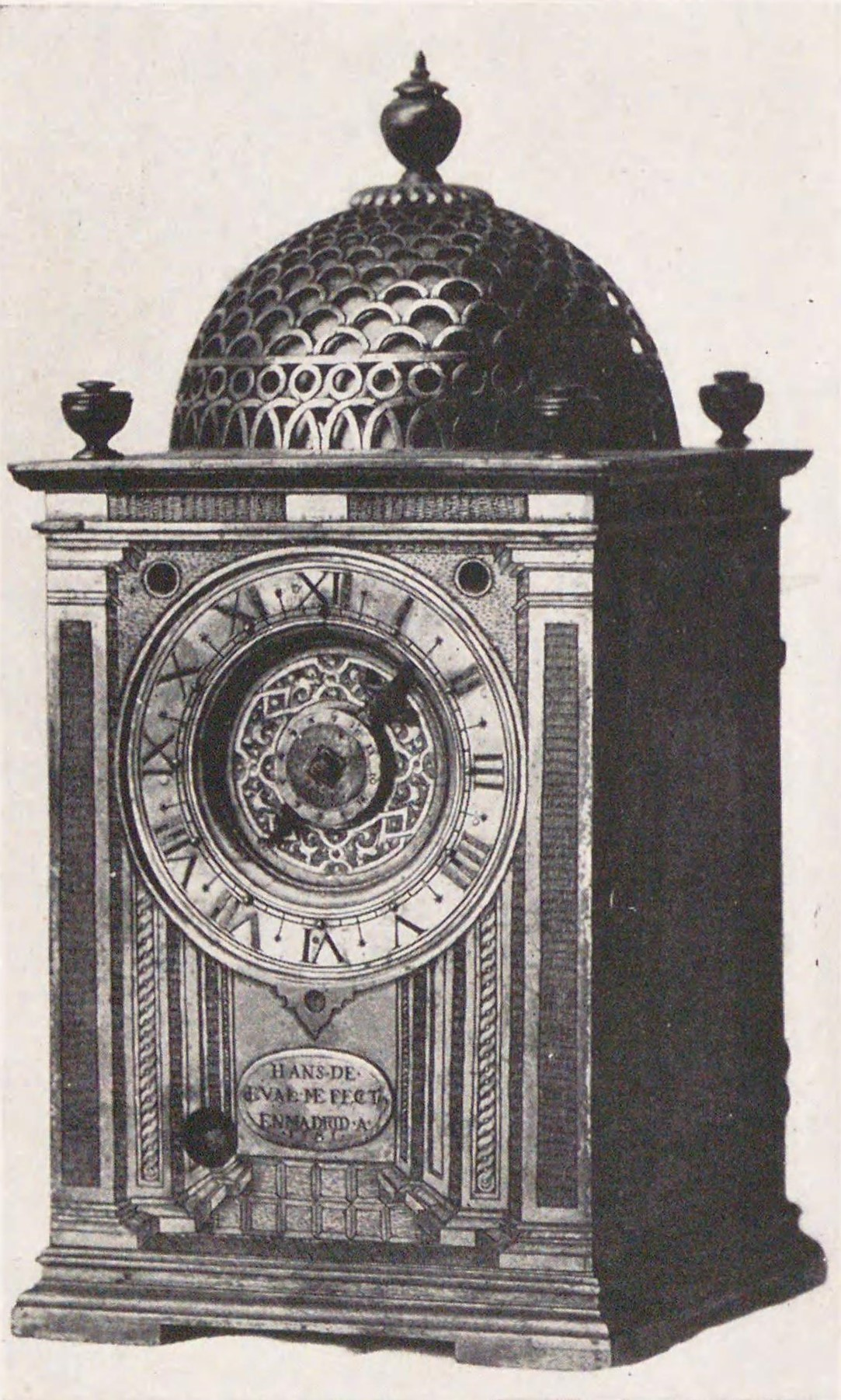
The clock made in 1581 by Hans de Evalo, which was presented to Tokugawa Ieyasu by Philip III of Spain through Sebastián Vizcaíno in 1611. An Important cultural property of Japan at Kunōzan Tōshō-gū, Shizuoka.

In 1611, Vizcaíno carried a Japanese delegation led by Tanaka Shōsuke from Mexico back to Japan. In an ambassadorial capacity, Vizcaíno met with the shōgun Tokugawa Hidetada and his father, the retired first shōgun, Tokugawa Ieyasu, founder of the Tokugawa dynasty. However, diplomacy soured due to a rumor that the Spanish intended to use the Japanese Christian minority to overthrow the shogunate and take control of Japan. After taking his leave in 1612, he surveyed the east coast of Japan and searched for two mythical islands called Rico de Oro and Rico de Plata. Failing to find them, he returned to Japan.

In 1613, Vizcaíno accompanied the Japanese embassy led by Hasekura Tsunenaga to Mexico. In Acapulco, Vizcaíno was seriously injured in a fight with the Japanese, as recorded by 17th-century Aztec historian Chimalpahin in his journal, "Annals of His Time". The Japanese entourage continued to Mexico City, and embarked a ship at Veracruz bound for Europe.

== Dutch conflict ==
In October 1615, Vizcaíno commanded 200 men at the port of Salagua against an attack by 200 Dutch pirates led by Joris van Spilbergen. In the afternoon, both sides ran out of ammunition. Vizcaíno's men retreated after the Dutch returned with more ammunition.

== Death ==
Sebastián Vizcaíno died in 1624 in Mexico City, New Spain.

In 1888, botanist Edward Lee Greene published Viscainoa, which is a genus of flowering plants from Mexico belonging to the family Zygophyllaceae and was named in Sebastián Vizcaíno's honour.
