= Enni =

Japanese Buddhist monk

Enni Ben'en
- 圓爾辯圓
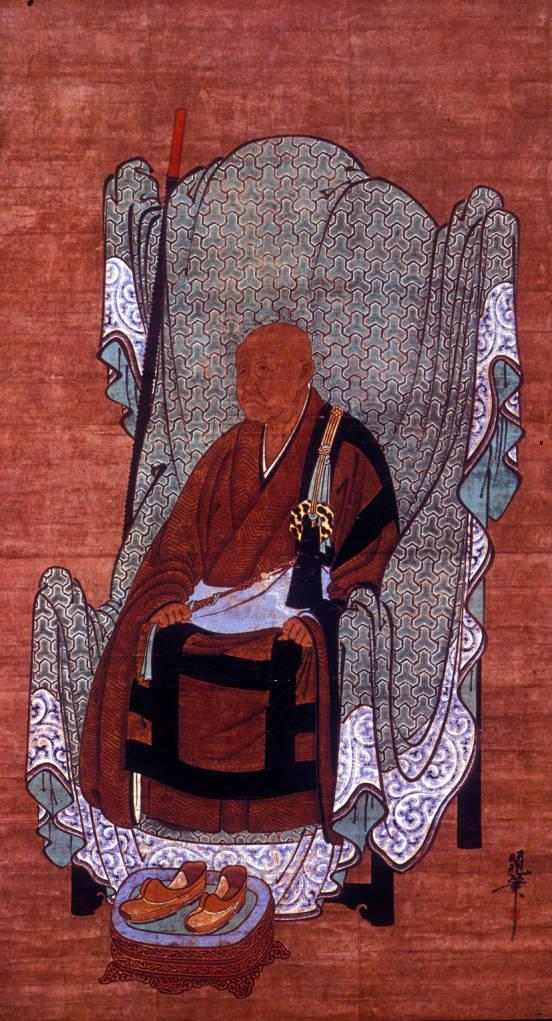
- Painting of Enni by the monk Kichizan Minchō. Kamakura period, 14th century

Personal life
- Born: 1 November 1202 (15th day, 10th month, Kennin 5) Shizuoka, Japan
- Died: 10 November 1280 (age 78) (17th day, 10th month, Kōan 3) Mount Kōya, Japan

Religious life
- Religion: Buddhism
- School: Mahayana Buddhism, Rinzai, Tendai

Senior posting
- Teacher: Eisai, Wuzhun Shifan

Enni Ben'en
- Traditional Chinese: 圓爾辯圓
- Simplified Chinese: 圆尔辩圆
Transcriptions
Standard Mandarin
- Hanyu Pinyin: Yuán'ěr Biànyuán
- Bopomofo: ㄩㄢˊ ㄦˇ ㄅㄧㄢˋ ㄩㄢˊ
- Wade–Giles: Yüan^{2}-êrh^{3} Pien^{4}-yüan^{2}
- IPA: [ɥɛ̌n.àɚ pjɛ̂n.ɥɛ̌n]

Enni Ben'en (圓爾辯圓; 1 November 1202 – 10 November 1280) or simply Enni, also known as Shōichi Kokushi, was a Japanese Buddhist monk. He started his Buddhist training as a Tendai monk. While he was studying with Eisai, a vision of Sugawara no Michizane appeared to him in a dream and told him to go to China and study meditation. Following this vision, he met the Rinzai teacher Wuzhun Shifan in China, and studied Mahayana with him. When he returned to Japan, after founding Jōten-ji temple in Hakata (Fukuoka), he founded Tōfuku-ji monastery in Kyoto, and practiced Zen as well as other types of Buddhism. His disciples included Mujū.

It is traditionally believed that Enni was one of the monks who introduced noodles to Japan from China.

The origin of the most famous festival in Fukuoka City, the Hakata Gion Yamakasa is believed to date back to 1241 and is closely related to Enni. He had people carry him around the town on a float while praying against the plague and eventually getting successfully rid of it. Thus in remembrance, it became an annual event.

== Works ==
Enni Ben'en is the possible author of the Shoichikokushi Kana Hogo (Vernacular Dharma Words of the National Teacher Sacred Unity). The text is also known as the Zazenron (Treatise on Seated Meditation). It is a brief text, composed of 24 questions and answers.

== Sources ==
- Bielefeldt, Carl (1994). "No-Mind and Sudden Awakening: Thoughts on the Soteriology of a Kamakura Zen Text". In Buswell, Robert; Gimello, Robert (eds.). Paths to Liberation: The Mārga and Its Transformations in Buddhist Thought. Delhi: Motilal Banarsidass. pp. 475–505.
- Dumoulin, Heinrich (2005). Zen Buddhism: Japan. Zen Buddhism: A History. Vol. 2. Bloomington, IL: World Wisdom.
- Faure, Bernard (2021), Rage and Ravage: Gods of Medieval Japan, Volume 3, University of Hawaii Press, ISBN 978-0824886240
